= 2010 Bonaire constitutional referendum =

17 December 2010
- I agree that Bonaire has become a public entity within the meaning of Article 134 of the Dutch Constitution

Results
Choice	Votes	%
Yes	391	11.96%
No	2,879	88.04%
Valid votes	3,270	95.78%
Invalid or blank votes	144	4.22%
Total votes	3,414	100.00%
Registered voters/turnout	9,698	35.2%

A constitutional referendum was held in Bonaire on 17 December 2010. The new constitution would make the island a municipality within the Netherlands. Although the results showed 88% had voted against the new status, the referendum had required a 51% turnout and was subsequently declared invalid as the actual turnout was only 35%.

== Background ==
The Netherlands Antilles was scheduled to cease to exist on 10 October 2010. Under the current terms of the dissolution of the Netherlands Antilles, Bonaire will become a fully integrated municipality within the Kingdom of the Netherlands. This may be changed should voters choose to become an associated state within the Netherlands instead.

The referendum was called after a government changeover from the Bonaire Patriotic Union (UPB), led by Ramonsito Booi, to the Bonaire Democratic Alliance (ADB), led by Jopie Abraham. The referendum was a key point of contention between the two parties. The succession was triggered by the departure of Anthony Nicolaas from the ruling coalition, an act which is being investigated as being a result of corruption.

The enabling legislation decided that the referendum should be worded "Ik wil dat Bonaire een rechtstreekse band met Nederland zal hebben in de vorm van A. Associatie (Bonaire krijgt een eigenstandige positie binnen het Koninkrijk) of B. Integratie (Bonaire wordt deel van Nederland)" (I desire that Bonaire shall have a direct tie with the Netherlands in the form of A: Association (Bonaire holds an independent position inside the Kingdom) or B: Integration (Bonaire becomes a part of the Netherlands)).

The set date for the referendum was originally set as 15 January 2010, exactly one week before the Netherlands Antilles general election. The date was chosen so it would not conflict with the general election. Other dates originally considered for the referendum were 11 December 2009, and 19 March 2010. The referendum did not take place on January 15, and was rescheduled to 26 March 2010 before being cancelled.

The Netherlands indicated that it would not cooperate if the referendum favors free association, stating "that the only alternative to the process of integration currently in execution was independence". Previously agreed upon payments from the Kingdom to Bonaire have been placed on hold pending the outcome of the referendum.

== Results ==
Choice	Votes	%
For	391	11.96
Against	2,879	88.04
Total	3,270	100.00
Valid votes	3,270	95.78
Invalid votes	99	2.90
Blank votes	45	1.32
Total votes	3,414	100.00
Registered voters/turnout	9,698	35.20
Source: Direct Democracy
