= Pelkermeer Saltworks =

Saltworks on Bonaire in the Dutch Caribbean

Coordinates: 12°03′30″N 68°15′30″W

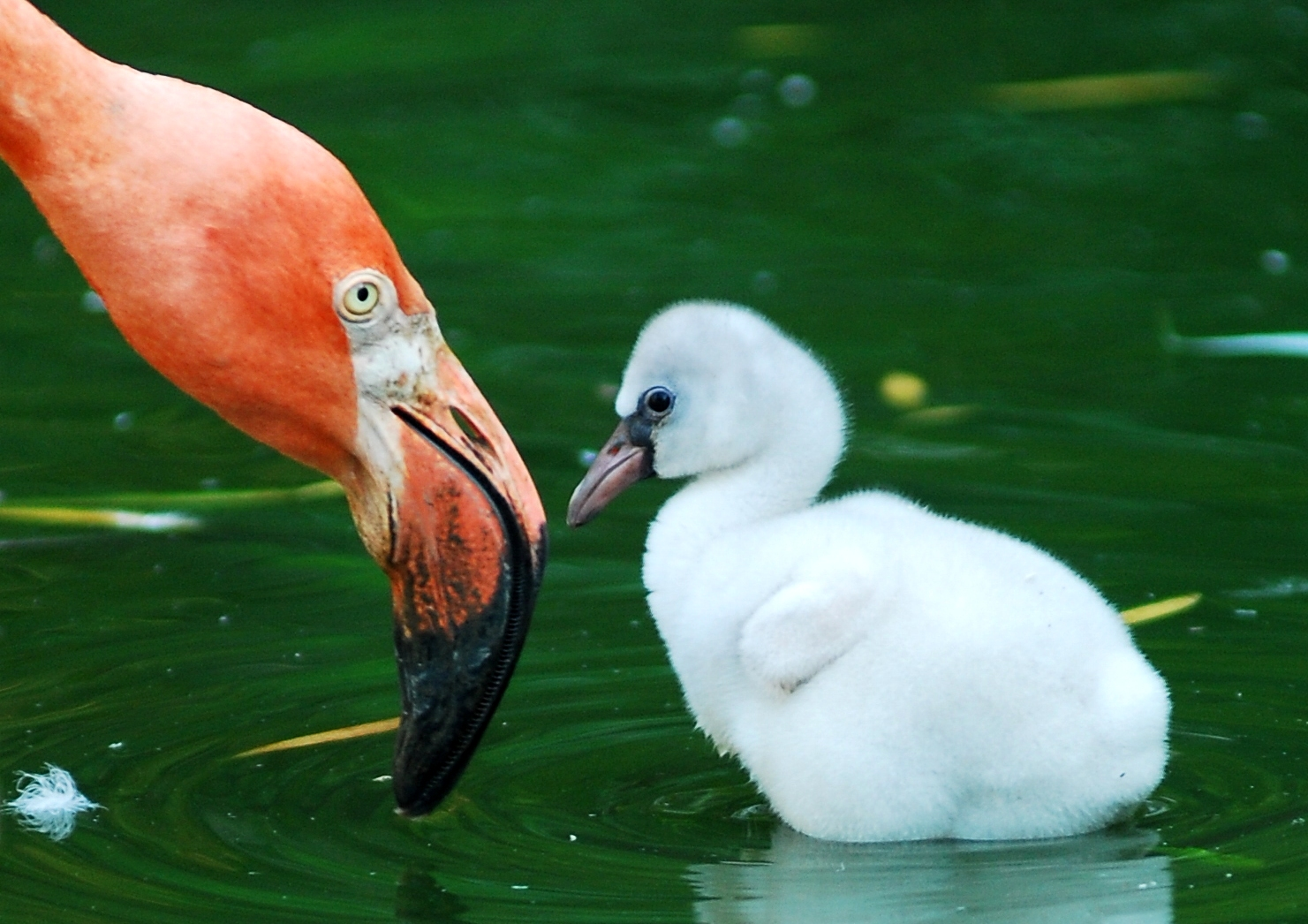
American flamingos breed at the saltworks

The Pelkermeer Saltworks is a 6,851 ha saltern at the southern end of the island of Bonaire in the Caribbean Netherlands. Originally a series of natural shallow lagoons, it has been modified over centuries to enable salt production. It has been identified as an Important Bird Area (IBA) by BirdLife International. Within the saltern there is a 55 ha reserve established to protect a breeding colony of about 5,000 American flamingos. The IBA also supports populations of least, common, sandwich and royal terns, as well as large numbers of migratory waders. The saltern has been designated a Ramsar site as a wetland of international importance.
