= Tera di Solo y Suave Biento =

Regional anthem of Bonaire

English: Land of Sun and Gentle Breeze
- Regional anthem of Bonaire
- Lyrics: J. B. A. Palm (music); Hubert (Lio) Booi (lyrics)
- Adopted: 1964 (Netherlands Antilles); 1981 (Bonaire)
- Relinquished: 2000 (Netherlands Antilles)

"Tera di Solo y Suave Biento" (English: "Land of Sun and Gentle Breeze"; Dutch: Het land van Zon en Zachte Wind), also known as the "Himno di Boneiru" ("Anthem of Bonaire") and originally the "Himno Boneriano" ("Bonairean Anthem"), is the anthem of Bonaire, a special municipality of the Netherlands in the Caribbean. The music was composed by J.B.A. (Tony) Palm, and the official lyrics, which are in Papiamentu, were written by Hubert (Lio) Booi (1919–2014). From 1964 to 2000, it also served as the anthem of the Netherlands Antilles, which at the time was wordless.

Since 15 December 1981, "Tera di Solo y suave biento" has been the official anthem of Bonaire, after its text and melody were made law in the island decree dated 11 December 1981, No. 2.

== Lyrics ==
Papiamentu lyrics

I
Tera di Solo i suave bientu
Patria orguyoso sali fo'i laman
Pueblo humilde i (Note: Sometimes omitted.) sèmper kontentu
Di un kondukta tur parti gaba

Pues laga nos trata tur dia
Pa sèmper nos Boneiru ta menta
Pa nos kanta den bon armonia
Dushi Boneiru nos tera stima

II
Laga nos tur komo Boneiriano
Uni nos kanto; alsa nos bos
Nos ku ta yu di un pueblo sano
Sèmper kontentu sperando den Dios

Ningun poder no por kita e afekto
Ku nos ta sinti pa e isla di nos
Maske chikitu ku su defekto
Nos ta stimele ariba tur kos

IPA transcription (Note: See Papiamentu § Phonology and Papiamentu orthography.)

1
[te.ra di so.lo i swa.ve bjen.tu]
[pa.trja‿or.gu.jo.so sa.li foi̯ la.man]
[pwe.blo hu.mil.de (i) sɛm.pər kon.ten.tu]
[di un kon.duk.ta tur par.ti ga.ba]

[pwes la.ga nos tra.ta tur di.a]
[pa sɛm.pər nos bo.nei̯.ru ta men.ta]
[pa nos kan.ta den bon ar.mo.ni.a]
[du.ʃi bo.nei̯.ru nos te.ra sti.ma]

2
[la.ga nos tur ko.mo bo.nei̯.ri.a.no]
[u.ni nos kan.to al.sa nos bos]
[nos ku ta ju di un pwe.blo sa.no]
[sɛm.pər kon.ten.tu spe.ran.do den djos]

[niŋ.gun po.der no por ki.t(a)‿e a.fek.to]
[ku nos ta sin.ti p(a)‿e is.la di nos]
[mas.ke t͡ʃi.ki.tu ku su de.fek.to]
[nos ta sti.me.le a.ri.ba tur kos]

English translation

I
Land of sun and gentle breeze,
Proud fatherland risen from the sea
Humble people, always happy,
Whose spirit is admired by all

So let us try each day,
For our Bonaire to always be mentioned
And we sing in good harmony
Sweet Bonaire, our beloved land

II
Let all of us as Bonairians,
Unite in song; raise our voices together
We, the children of a healthy people,
Always happy, trusting in God

No strength can remove this love,
That we feel for our island
Even though it is small and not perfect
We esteem it above everything

Spanish translation

I
Tierra de sol y suave viento,
Patria orgullosa salida del mar
Pueblo humilde y siempre contento
De una conducta que todos admiran

Permitidnos afanar todo el día,
Y tener siempre a Bonaire en la mente
Para cantar en perfecta armonía:
Amado Bonaire, nuestra patria querida

II
Permitid a todo bonaireano,
Unid su canto; alzad su voz
Nosotros como hijos de una raza sana
Siempre contentos esperando a Dios

Ningún poder logrará arrancarnos el afecto
Que sentimos por nuestro terruño
Aunque pequeño y con sus defectos
Nosotros le amamos cada rincón

Dutch translation

I
Land van zon en zachte bries
Een trots land verrezen uit de zee
Bescheiden volk, altijd tevreden
Zich altijd dapper werend

Laat ons elke dag proberen
Bonaire bekend te maken
We zingen in goede harmonie:
Heerlijk Bonaire, ons geliefd vaderland

II
Laat ons als Bonaireanen
Verenigingen in zangen; onze stemmen verheffen
Wij, als kinderen van een gezond volk,
Altijd gelukkig, gelovend in God

Geen kracht kan ons deze liefde afnemen
Zoals wij die voelen voor ons eiland
Ondanks dat het klein is en niet volmaakt
Wij houden ervan boven alles
