= Scholengemeenschap Bonaire =

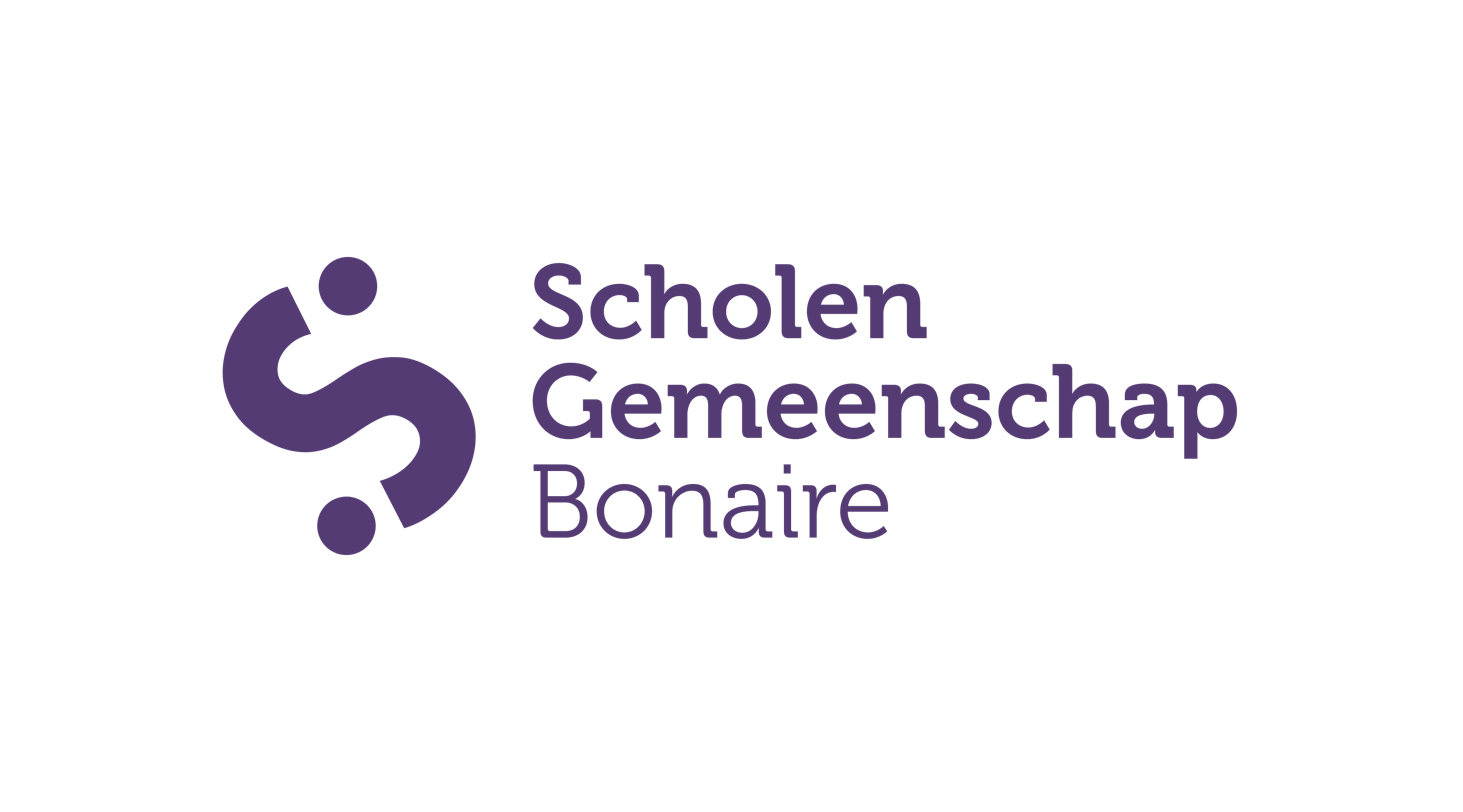
- Kralendijk; Bonaire

Information
- Type: Secondary school Senior secondary vocational education
- Website: sgbonaire.com

Scholengemeenschap Bonaire (SGB) The Scholengemeenschap Bonaire (SGB) is the primary organization for secondary education and secondary vocational education on Bonaire. As a comprehensive school, it offers a wide range of educational paths, including practical training, general secondary education, and pre-university tracks. The SGB plays a vital role in the educational and social development of the island's youth.

== Educational departments ==
The organization is divided into several distinct schools to cater to different educational levels:

- Liseo Boneriano: Provides theoretical secondary education, including mavo (theoretical path), havo (senior general secondary education), and vwo (university preparatory education).
- VMBO Bonaire: Offers pre-vocational secondary education with various practical and technical specializations (basic and cadre-based learning pathways).
- SLP Bonaire: A department dedicated to practical education and tailored support for students with specific learning needs.
- MBO Bonaire: Provides secondary vocational education (levels 1 through 4) in fields such as hospitality, construction, healthcare, and business, often in collaboration with local industries.

== Language and organization ==
Reflecting the multicultural nature of the island, the SGB serves a diverse student body. While the primary language of instruction is Dutch, the local language Papiamentu plays a significant role in daily school life. The institution operates under the Foundation for Public Education Bonaire (Stichting Openbaar Onderwijs Bonaire) and maintains a close partnership with the Dutch Ministry of Education, Culture, and Science (OCW).

== Facilities ==
The SGB campus is situated across multiple locations in Kralendijk. In recent years, the school has undergone significant modernization and expansion projects to provide state-of-the-art classrooms, workshops, and sports facilities for its students.
