= Lac Bay =

Bay on Bonaire in the Dutch Caribbean

Coordinates: 12°05′59″N 68°13′59″W

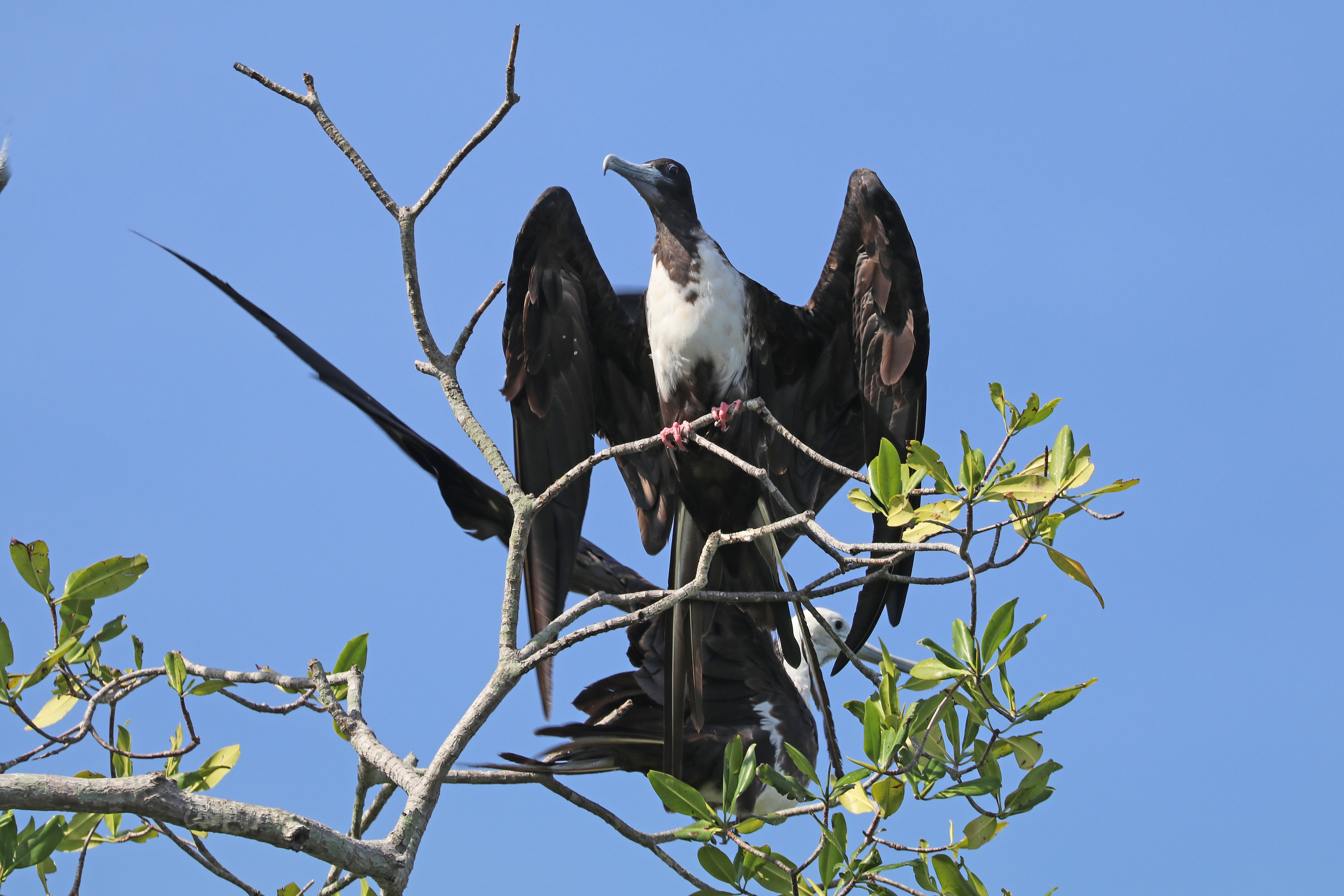
The IBA provides a roost site for magnificent frigatebirds

Lac Bay, also known as Lac Baai, Het Lac, Lac Cai,, or simply Lac, is a shallow bay on the south-eastern coast of the island of Bonaire in the Caribbean Netherlands. It has a fringing reef at its mouth and contains about 100 ha of mangroves as well as a small harbour for fishing vessels. Its seagrass beds are used by sea turtles. It has been designated a Ramsar site as a wetland of international importance.

== Description ==
Bonaire is a Caribbean island in the Leeward Antilles, one of the three Dutch ABC islands. Lac Bay is an inland bay on the southeast of the island, 7 km from the capital of Kralendijk. The largest and most important lagoon on the island, it is sheltered from the ocean by a fringing reef. The bay contains the only mangroves of any note on the island. It also has stretches of sea grass.

The bay is known by a variety of different names: Lac Bay, Lac Baai, Het Lac, Lac Cai, or simply Lac.

== History ==
Lac Bay was first made part of a protected area in 1979, with the establishment of Bonaire Marine Park, which was founded with the help of a grant from the World Wildlife Fund and funding from Bonaire's government. It was placed under the management of STINAPA Bonaire and continued to be managed for four years, before a lack of further funding led to the gradual disappearance of enforcement in the park. Increasing tourism gradually increased the stress on Bonaire's coral reefs so much that new momentum was established for the resurrection of the park's active management. To that end, the Dutch government provided stopgap funding for a three-year period while setting up a funding source for the park, which was eventually secured by charging fees from recreational divers. In 1999, the Marine Park, including Lac Bay, was made a national park and renamed to Bonaire National Marine Park by the Dutch government.

The lagoon was first recognised as a Ramsar site in 1980; the boundaries of the site were extended to cover the bay's fringing corals in 2021. A 2,076 hectare area around Lac Bay was identified by BirdLife International as an Important Bird Area (IBA) in 2007 because it supports populations of threatened or restricted-range bird species. The Bonaire Marine Park, including Lac Bay, was placed on the Netherlands' Tentative List of UNESCO World Heritage Sites in 2011, indicating that it is a nominee for becoming a full-fledged WHS.

In March 2024, an oil spill caused by the sinking of an oil tanker near Tobago mildly affected Lac Bay. Later that year in October, the bay was closed to the public for a week due to the presence of an American crocodile in the bay.

== Fauna ==
The Lac Bay IBA harbours bare-eyed pigeons, yellow-shouldered amazons and Caribbean elaenias. In the past it has supported breeding tricoloured herons, reddish and snowy egrets and probably yellow-crowned night-herons. It is also the site of a night roost of magnificent frigatebirds, as well as providing feeding habitat for migratory waders.

Its seagrass beds are used by sea turtles.
