= Bonaire =

Dutch Caribbean island

Bonaire Boneiru (Papiamento)
- Special municipality of the Netherlands
- Flag Coat of arms
- Anthem: "Tera di Solo y Suave Biento" (English: "Land of Sun and Gentle Breeze")
- Location of Bonaire (circled in red) in the Caribbean
- Coordinates: 12°12′N 68°15′W
- Country: Netherlands
- Overseas region: Caribbean Netherlands
- Incorporated into the Netherlands: 10 October 2010 (Dissolution of the Netherlands Antilles)
- Municipal seat: Kralendijk

Government (see Politics of the Netherlands)
  - Lt. Governor: John Soliano

Area
  - Total: 288 km^{2} (111 sq mi)

Population (1 January 2025)
  - Total: 26,552
  - Density: 83.6/km^{2} (217/sq mi)
- Demonyms: Bonairean; Dutch

Languages
  - Official: Papiamentu • Dutch
- Time zone: UTC−4:00 (AST)
- Calling code: +599
- ISO 3166 code: BQ-BO, NL-BQ1
- Currency: United States dollar ($) (USD)
- Internet TLD: .nl; .bq (Note: .bq is designated but not in use for the Caribbean Netherlands. Like the rest of the Netherlands, .nl is primarily in use.)

Bonaire (Note: /bɒˈnɛər/ bon-AIR; Dutch: [boːˈnɛːr(ə)]; Papiamento: Boneiru [bʊˈne̝i̯ru]) is a Caribbean island in the Leeward Antilles. A special municipality (officially "public body") of the Netherlands, its seat is the port of Kralendijk, on the west (leeward) coast of the island. Aruba, Bonaire and Curaçao form the ABC islands, 80 km (50 mi) off the coast of Venezuela. The islands have an arid climate that attracts visitors seeking warm, sunny weather all year round, and they lie outside the Main Development Region for tropical cyclones. Bonaire is a popular snorkeling and scuba diving destination because of its multiple shore diving sites, shipwrecks and easy access to the island's fringing reefs.

As of 1 January 2025, the island's population total 26,552 permanent residents, an increase of 10,011 since 2012. The island's total land area is 288 km^{2} (111 sq mi); it is 38.6 km (24.0 mi) long from north to south, and ranges from 5–8 km (3–5 mi) wide from east to west. A short 800 m (0.50 mi) west of Bonaire across the sea is the uninhabited islet of Klein Bonaire with a total land area of 6 km^{2} (2.3 sq mi). Klein Bonaire has low-growing vegetation including cactus, with sparse palm trees near the water and is bordered by white sandy beaches and a fringing reef. The reefs, beaches and on-island reserves located on both Bonaire and Klein Bonaire are under the protection of the Bonaire National Marine Park, and managed by STINAPA Bonaire.

Bonaire was part of the Netherlands Antilles until the country's dissolution in 2010, when the island became a special municipality (officially, a "Caribbean public body") within the country of the Netherlands. It is one of three special municipalities in the Caribbean; the others are Sint Eustatius and Saba. 80% of Bonaire's inhabitants are Dutch nationals, and nearly 60% of its residents were born in the former Netherlands Antilles and Aruba.

== Etymology ==
The name 'Bonaire' is thought to be derived from the Caquetio word 'Bonay', meaning 'low country'. The early Spanish and Dutch modified its spelling to Bojnaj and also Bonaire. French influence, while present at various times, was never strong enough to make the assumption that the name means 'good air'. According to another theory, the name might be derived from the Spanish phrase "buen aire", which does mean 'good air', as the Spanish were the first Europeans to colonise the island.

== History ==
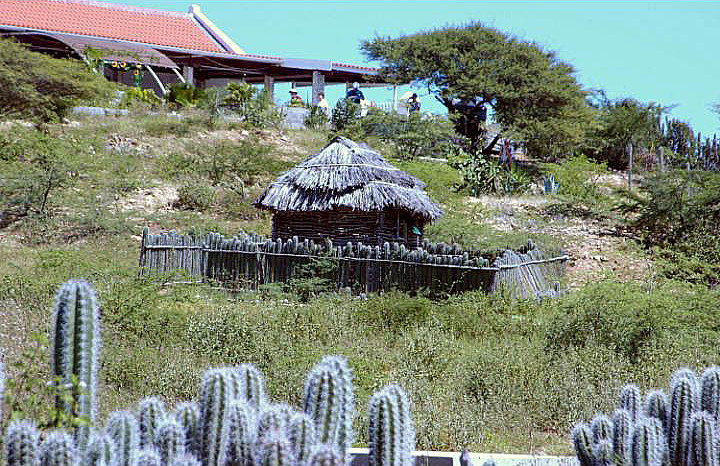
Traditional old houses with cactus fences, preserved in the outdoor museum of Rincon, Bonaire

=== Original inhabitants ===
The earliest evidence of human habitation on the islands is from the Archaic period; archaeological evidence suggests the people lived in family-based groups of approximately 100 and were semi-nomadic hunter-gatherers and fishers. Of the islands, Curaçao appears to have been settled first, approximately 4500 BP (2550 BC). The earliest evidence of human habitation in Bonaire is at Lagun and dates to approximately 3400 BP (1450 BC); Curaçao appears to have become temporarily uninhabited in the same period, around 3500 BP (1560 BC). The Caquetío Indians, a branch of the Arawak who came by canoe from Venezuela in about 1000 AD, speakers of an Arawakan language, arrived in the islands from South America around 500 AD. Archaeological remains of the Caquetío culture have been found at sites northeast of Kralendijk and near Lac Bay. Caquetío rock paintings and petroglyphs are preserved in caves at Spelonk, Onima, Ceru Pungi and Ceru Crita-Cabai. The Caquetíos apparently appeared very tall to the first Spaniards encountering them, for the Spanish name for the ABC islands was las Islas de los Gigantes, 'the islands of the giants'. Remnants of Bonaire's indigenous population can be seen in some of the island's current inhabitants.

=== Spanish period ===
In 1499, Alonso de Ojeda arrived in Curaçao and a neighbouring island that was almost certainly Bonaire. Ojeda was accompanied by Amerigo Vespucci and Juan de la Cosa. De La Cosa's Mappa Mundi of 1500 shows Bonaire and calls it Isla do Palo Brasil or "Island of Brazilwood". The Spanish decided that the three ABC Islands were useless because they did not have known metal deposits, and in 1515 they enslaved the Caquetío to work in the copper mines of Santo Domingo on the island of Hispaniola; the total number may have been between 500 and 2,000.

Spain colonized Bonaire since 1499 for a period of approximately one century. Likewise, one of the oldest references to the name of the island is found in the archive of the Main Public Registry of the city of Caracas (Venezuela). A document dated 9 December 1595, specifies that Don Francisco Montesinos, Curate and Vicar of "las Yslas de Curasao, Aruba y Bonaire" conferred a power of attorney to Pedro Gutiérrez de Lugo, resident in Caracas, to collect from the Royal Treasury of His Catholic Majesty Don Felipe II, the salary that corresponded to him for his office as priest and vicar of the islands.

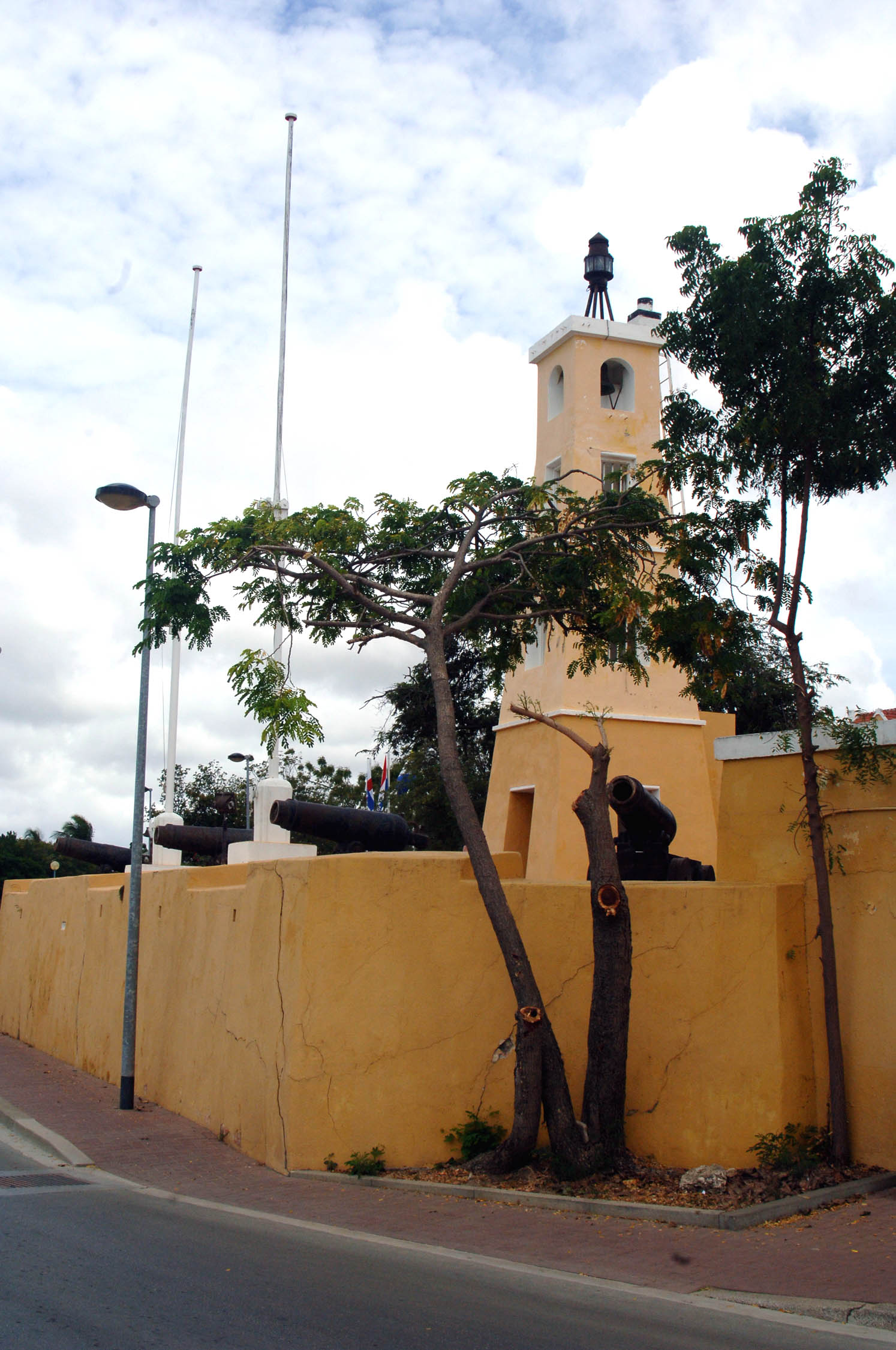
Fort Oranje in Kralendijk, built in 1639

In 1526, Juan Martínez de Ampiés was appointed Spanish commander of the ABC Islands. He brought back some of the original Caquetio Indian inhabitants to Bonaire and Curaçao. Ampies also imported domesticated animals from Spain, including cows, donkeys, goats, horses, pigs and sheep. The Spaniards thought that Bonaire could be used as a cattle plantation worked by natives. The cattle were raised for hides rather than meat. The Spanish inhabitants lived mostly in the inland town of Rincon as its geography made it relatively safe from pirate attacks .

=== Dutch period ===
The Dutch West India Company was founded in 1602. Starting in 1623, ships of the West India Company called at Bonaire to obtain meat, water and wood. The Dutch also abandoned some Spanish and Portuguese prisoners there, and these people founded the town of Antriol, which is a contraction of Spanish al interior (English: inside). The Dutch and the Spanish fought from 1568 to 1648 in what is now known as the Eighty Years War. In 1633, the Dutch – having lost the island of St. Maarten to the Spanish – retaliated by attacking Curaçao, Bonaire and Aruba. Bonaire was conquered in March 1636. The Dutch built Fort Oranje in 1639.

While Curaçao emerged as a centre of the slave trade, Bonaire became a plantation of the Dutch West India Company. Salt became a major export product of the island; a small number of African slaves were put to work alongside Indians and convicts, cultivating dyewood and maize and harvesting solar salt around Blue Pan. Slave quarters, built entirely of stone and too short for a man to stand upright in, still stand in the area around Rincon and along the salt pans. The slave population grew in the 1710s when a famine and social unrest on Curaçao caused the Dutch to relocate a large number of slaves to Bonaire. Historically, Dutch was not widely spoken on the island outside of colonial administration; its use increased in the late 19th and early 20th centuries. Students on Curaçao, Aruba and Bonaire were taught predominantly in Spanish until the late 18th century when the British took Curaçao, Aruba and Bonaire; the teaching of Spanish was restored when Dutch rule resumed in 1815.

During the Napoleonic Wars, the Netherlands lost control of Bonaire twice, once from 1800 to 1803, and again from 1807 to 1816. During these intervals, the British had control of the neighbouring island of Curaçao and of Bonaire. The ABC islands were returned to the Netherlands under the Anglo-Dutch Treaty of 1814. During the period of British rule, a large number of white traders settled on Bonaire, and built the settlement of Playa (Kralendijk) in 1810.

==== Emancipation ====
From 1816 until 1868, Bonaire remained a government plantation. In 1825, there were about 300 government-owned slaves on the island. Gradually many of the slaves were freed and became freemen with an obligation to render some services to the government. The remaining slaves were freed on 30 September 1862 under the Emancipation Regulation. A total of 607 government slaves and 151 private slaves were freed at that time.

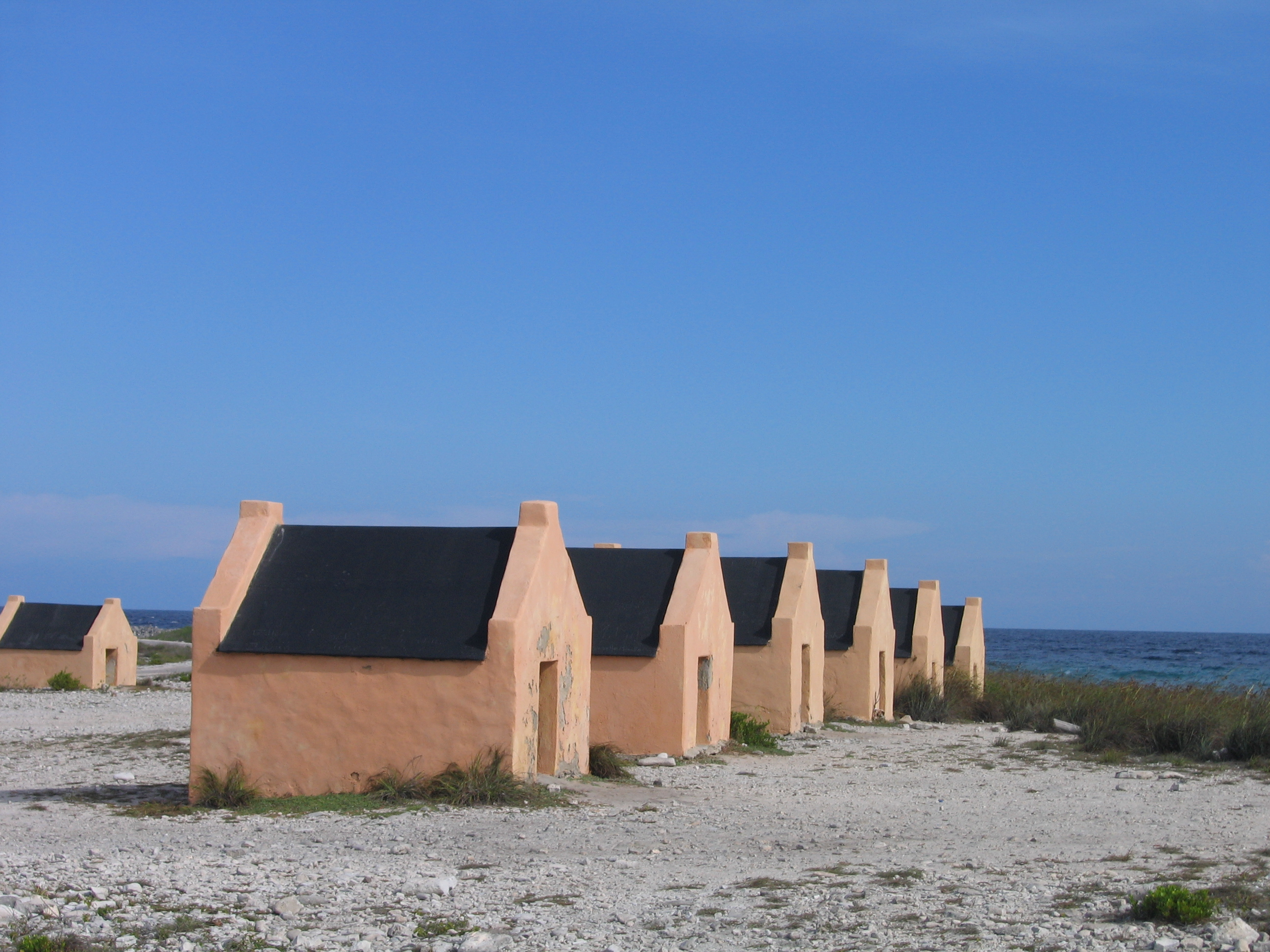
Slave huts

==== World War II ====
During the German occupation of the Netherlands during World War II, Bonaire was a protectorate of Britain and the United States. The American army built the Flamingo Airport as an air force base. After Germany invaded the Netherlands on 10 May 1940, authorities declared martial law, and many German and Austrian citizens, as well as Dutch thought to be German sympathizers, were interned in a camp on Bonaire. Some of these remained in this camp for the war's duration, and others were transferred to new camps built on the mainland in the first year of the war. In 1944, Princess Juliana and Eleanor Roosevelt visited the troops on Bonaire.

Bonairean sailors made an above-average contribution during World War II. German U-boats tried to eliminate shipping around the Aruba and Curaçao refineries and thus eliminate the island's considerable fuel production for the Allies. Bonairean-crewed ships also took part in these battles. Among the many missing after the war, were the 34 Bonaireans who died on these ships (more than on the other islands of the then Dutch West Indies). During hostilities, the site where the Divi Flamingo Beach Resort & Casino now stands served as an internment camp for Germans and Austrians living in the Antilles, mainly because they were distrusted. There were fears they could have sabotaged the giant oil refineries on Aruba and Curaçao that were supplying paraffin to the Allied air fleet.

The camp was in operation from 1940 to 1947. In total, 461 people were interned during this period without trial, most of them completely innocent. Among them were Medardo de Marchena and also the photographer Fred Fischer, then still an Austrian citizen. Many German internees had just fled Nazi violence. But there were also German prisoners of war, some of whom remained after the war. In September 1943, the father of George Maduro, after whom Madurodam is named, asked Queen Wilhelmina to exchange his son for the German internees on Bonaire. The government did not grant the request. After the war, the empty barracks became Bonaire's first hotel: Zeebad.

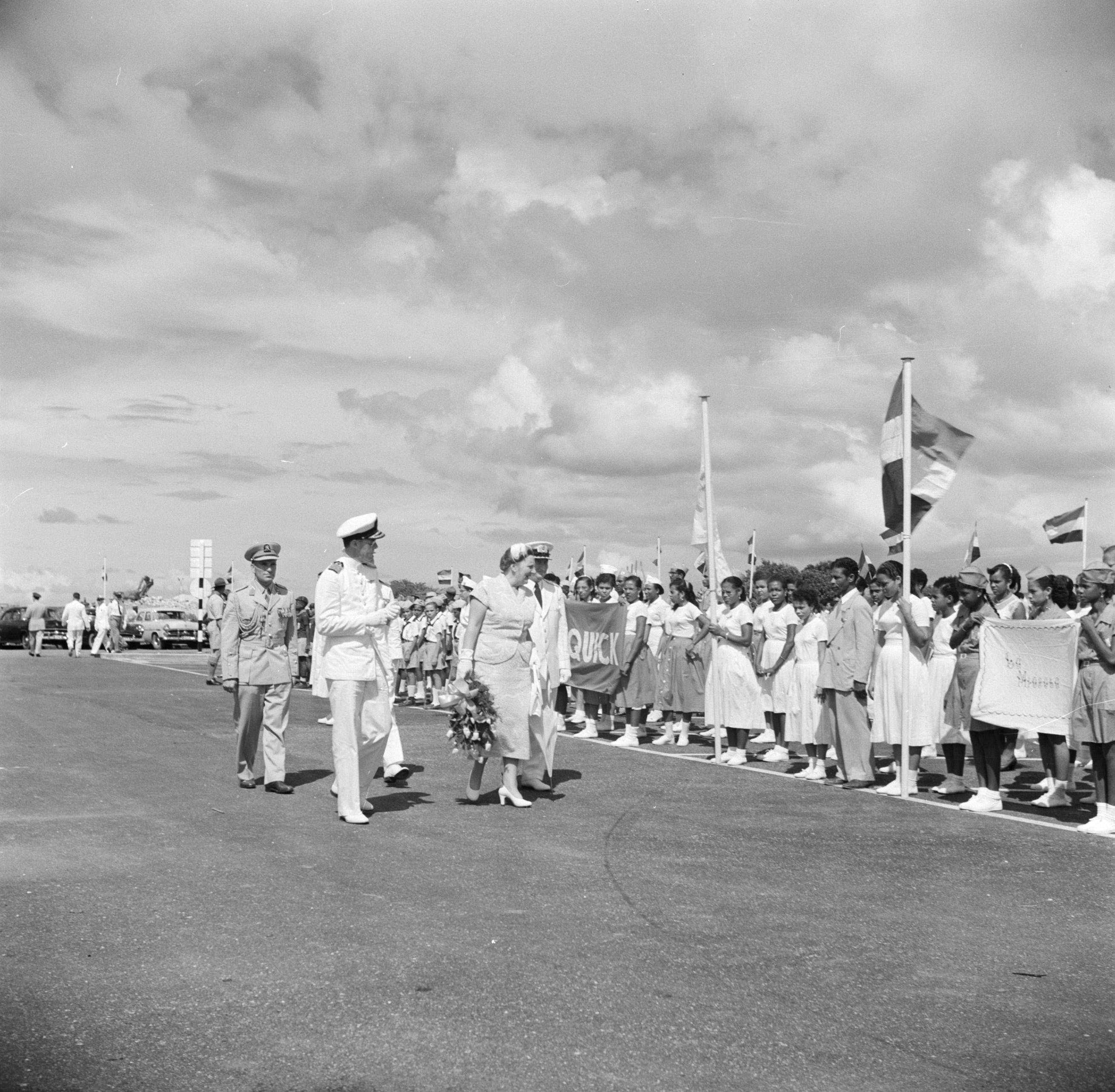
Royal visit of Queen Juliana and Prince Bernhard in 1955

==== Post-war ====
After the war, the economy of Bonaire continued to develop. The airport was converted to civilian use and the former internment camp was converted to become the first hotel on Bonaire. The Dutchman Pierre Schunck started a clothing factory known as Schunck's Kledingindustrie Bonaire, a partial solution for the large female surplus on the island. In 1964, Trans World Radio began broadcasting from Bonaire. Radio Netherlands Worldwide built two shortwave transmitters on Bonaire in 1969. The second major hotel (Bonaire Beach Hotel) was completed in 1962. Salt production resumed in 1966 when the salt pans were expanded and modernized by the Antilles International Salt Company, a subsidiary of the International Salt Company. Part of the facilities extend into the Caribbean Sea and form the popular dive site known as Salt Pier. The Bonaire Petroleum Corporation (BOPEC) oil terminal was opened in 1975 for trans-shipping oil. Politically Bonaire formed part of the Netherlands Antilles from 1954 to 2010; it is now a special municipality within the Netherlands. In 2011 the island officially adopted the US dollar as its currency.

=== Dissolution of the Netherlands Antilles ===
On 10 October 2010, the Netherlands Antilles was dissolved. As a result, the government of the Netherlands assumed the task of public administration of the Caribbean Netherlands or BES Islands comprising Bonaire, St Eustatius and Saba. The three islands acquired new status as "special municipalities" (bijzondere gemeenten), making them part of the Netherlands itself, a form of "public body" (openbaar lichaam) as outlined in article 134 of the Dutch Constitution. Special municipalities do not constitute part of a province.

As a special municipality, Bonaire is very much like ordinary Dutch municipalities in that it has a mayor, aldermen and a municipal council, and is governed according to most Dutch laws. Antillean legislation remained in force after 10 October 2010, with the exception of those cases where Antillean law was replaced by Bonaire's municipal law. It was believed best for the island to not introduce the entire body of Dutch legislation at one time as it would cause confusion. Therefore, Dutch legislation is being introduced in stages. Bonaire retained its own unique culture while residents enjoy the same rights as Dutch citizens, including the right to vote in Dutch parliamentary elections in the Netherlands. Residents also have access to new or improved facilities and government benefits including, but not limited to, universal health care; improved health care facilities; better educational facilities with additional training for teachers, new teaching methods and new school buildings; social housing for low-income individuals and families; a centrally dispatched single police force, fire department and ambulance service. While the three islands are considered to be land of the Netherlands, they are not a part of the European Union, therefore not subject to European Union Law. They are considered to be an overseas country and territory.

Bonaire's non-governmental organization, Nos Ke Boneiru Bèk ("We Want Bonaire Back"), is against the current constitutional relationship with the Netherlands. With reference to Bonaire's 2004 referendum, the organization is of the opinion that such an arrangement was never the choice of the people. The Dutch Minister of Home Affairs and Kingdom Relations, Ronald Plasterk, replied to the organization confirming that only the "Island Councils in the Caribbean Netherlands have the authority to decide on holding a constitutional referendum, not the Dutch government." In response, the organization gathered more than 3,500 signatures in 2013 favouring a new referendum. In a letter to minister Plasterk, James Finies, chairman of Nos Ke Boneiru Bèk, requested a "new referendum under the right of self-determination". Plasterk responded by advising Finies that preparations for the evaluation of the public entity structure had begun for 2015, but a "possible change of the constitutional relations is not part of that evaluation". The new referendum took place on 18 December 2015. 65% of the turnout voted that they were not happy with the current relationship between Bonaire and the Netherlands.

== Geography ==
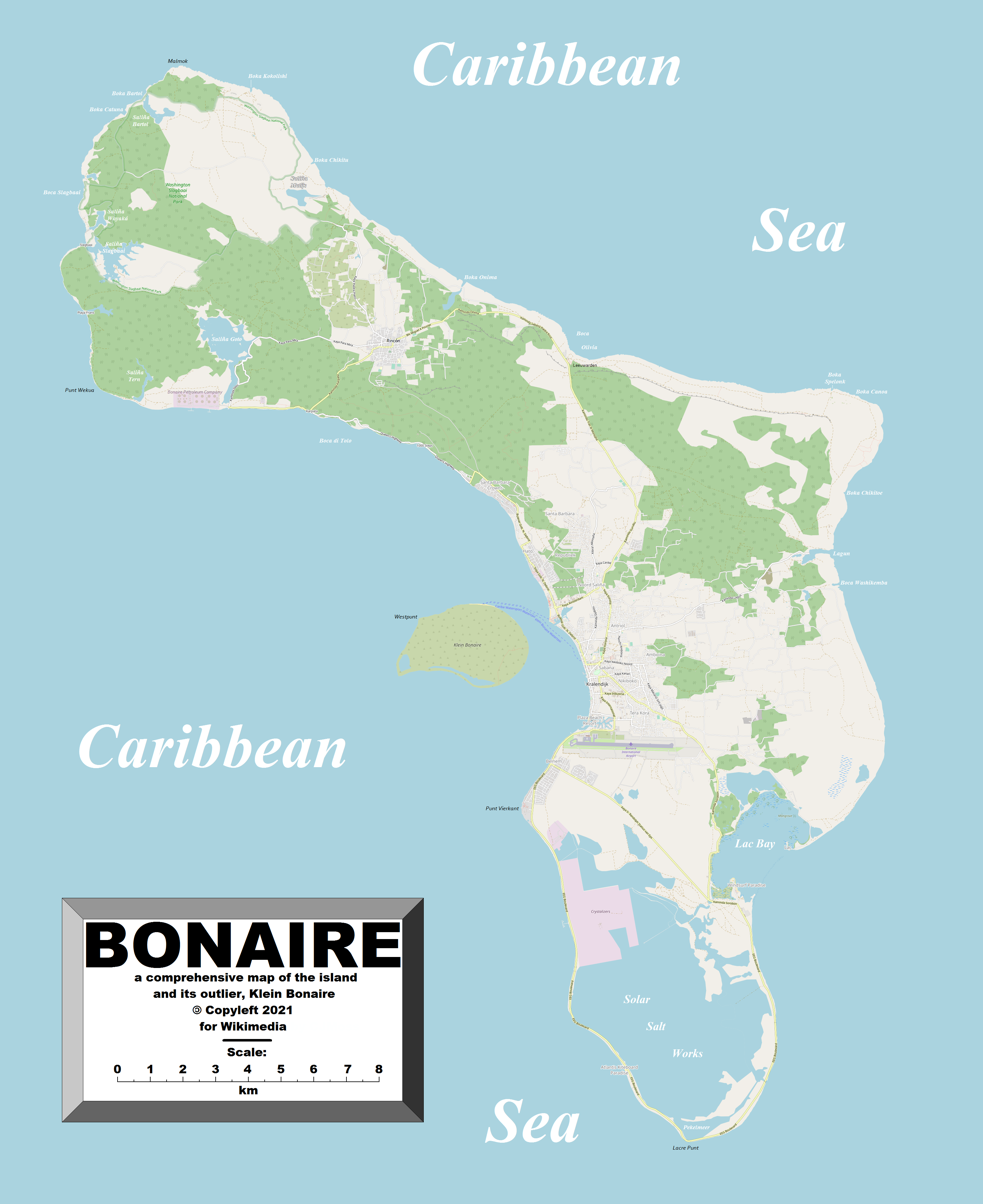
Enlargeable, detailed map of Bonaire

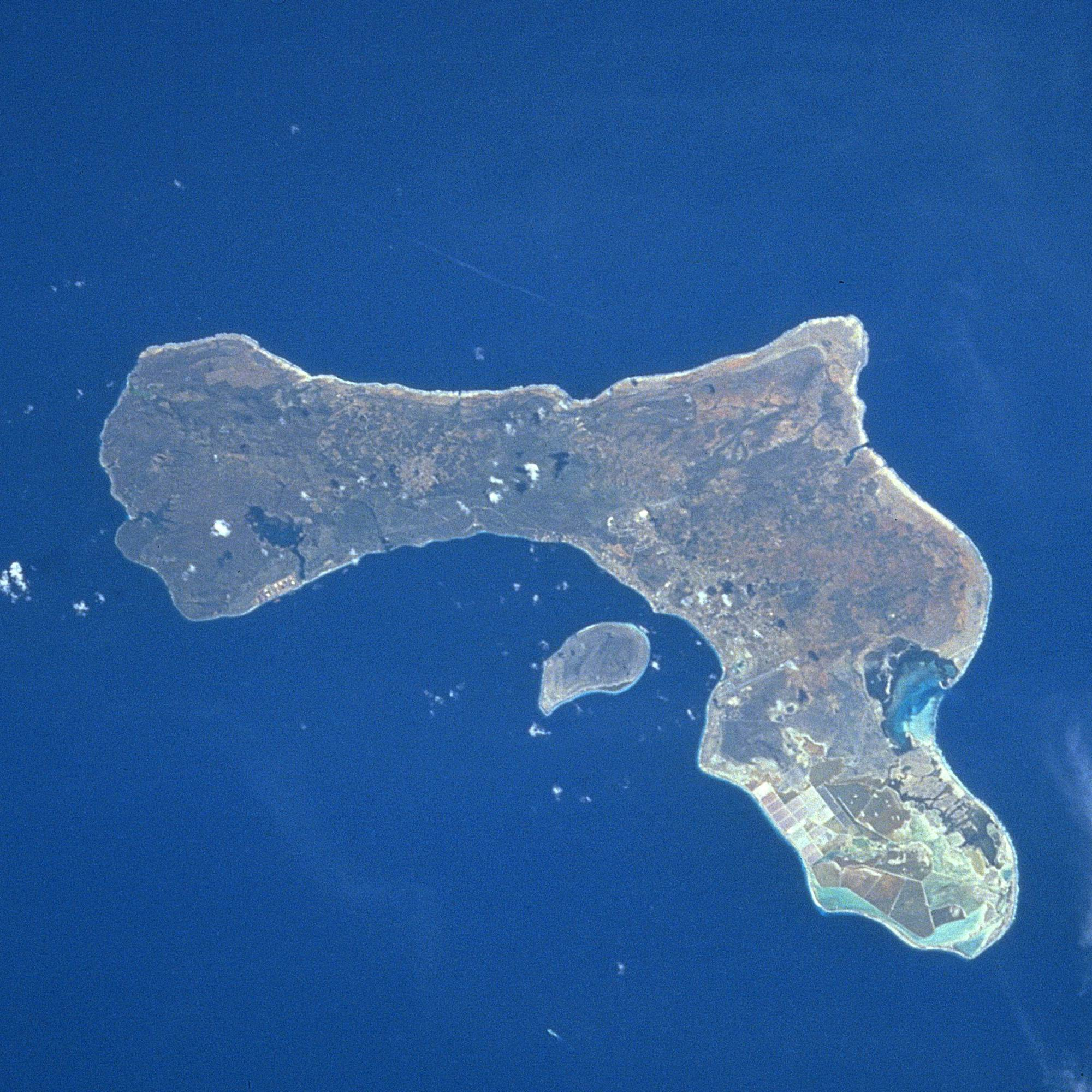
Satellite image of Bonaire and the small island of Klein Bonaire

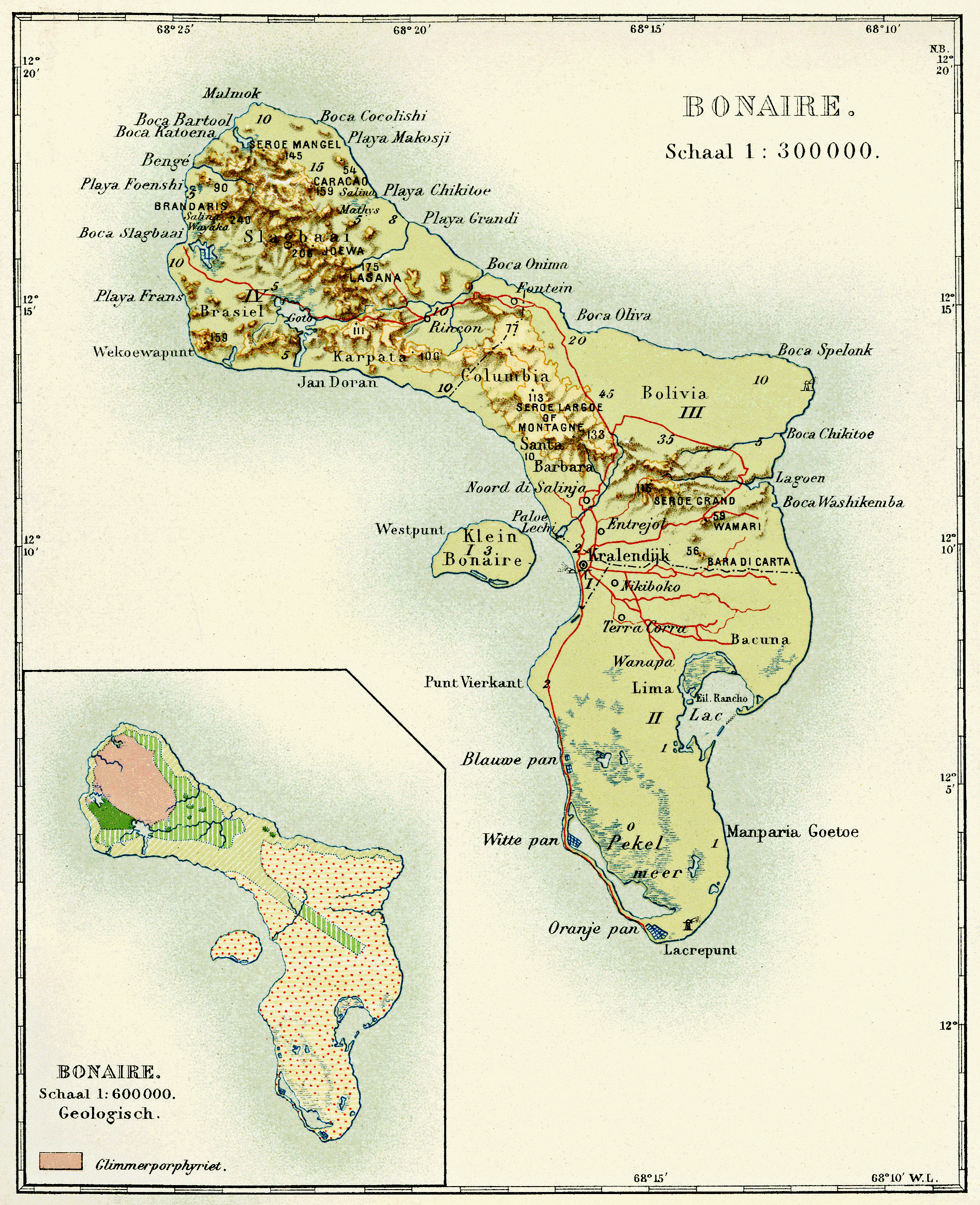
Map of Bonaire, 1914–1917

Bonaire lies about 80 kilometres (50 mi) off the coast of Venezuela. The island has a land area of 288 km^{2} (111 sq mi), with an additional 6 km^{2} (2.3 sq mi) added by Klein Bonaire, a small uninhabited island off its west coast.

The northern end of Bonaire is relatively mountainous, although its highest peak, Mount Brandaris, is only 240 metres (790 feet). The southern part of the island is nearly flat and barely rises above sea level. A significant portion of this southern region is covered with sea water in process of evaporation for salt production. This area also contains Lac Bay with its large mangrove forest. The shoreline of Bonaire is dotted with lagoons and inlets, the largest of which is Goto Lake in the north. These lagoons and wetlands provide an excellent habitat for a wide variety of shorebirds.

While Bonaire has some hills and variations in altitude, Klein Bonaire's surface is quite level and just about two meters above sea level. Because Klein Bonaire is as yet undeveloped, the fringing reef system surrounding Klein Bonaire is pristine.

=== Geology ===
Geologists believe that Bonaire and the other ABC islands were formed about 90 million years ago. As the Caribbean plate collided with the South American plate, it forced a large mass of rock to the ocean surface and created the Leeward Antilles Ridge. The islands of Bonaire, Aruba, and Curaçao were formed along this ridge. As such, Bonaire lies within the Caribbean–South America plate boundary zone. Some geologists place Bonaire's location on the South American continental shelf; while others place the island's location on or above the Caribbean plate.

The island is essentially coral that has been geologically pushed up and out of the sea. As the seabed rose upwards a vast coral reef grew on what is now dry land. These corals were eventually exposed to air and perished, becoming surface limestone deposits over the millennia. As a result, reef limestone covers a large part of the Bonaire today, as well as the natural fringing reef system, in which the coral formations start at the shoreline. Tidal variations are only about 55–60 centimetres (1.8–2.0 ft), so the corals start at the low tide line and continue on, following the underwater topography of the island's base. Bonaire's tides are more affected by a combination of wind and low/high-pressure systems than by the moon.

Due to its history, the geology of Bonaire is dominated by gently dipping carbonate rocks ranging in age from Cretaceous (≈90-100 million years ago (Ma)) to Miocene (≈5 Ma), which lie unconformably on a pre-Cretaceous igneous basement. Where the unconformity corresponds with sea-level erosion, caves are common.

=== Climate ===
Bonaire has a warm, dry (though humid) and windy climate. The average temperature is 27.5 °C (81.5 °F) with a 1.4 °C (2.5 °F) seasonal variation and 5.6 °C (10 °F) daily variation. The highest recorded temperature is 35.8 °C (96.4 °F) and the lowest, 19.8 °C (67.6 °F). The ocean temperature around the island fluctuates between 26 and 30 °C (78 and 86 °F). Nearly constant winds blow from the east with an average speed of 22 km/h (14 mph). The humidity is very constant, averaging 76% and fluctuating between 85% and 66% on a daily basis. This semi-arid climate is conducive to a variety of cacti and other desert plants.

Average annual rainfall is 520 mm (20.5 in), most of which occurs in October through January. Bonaire lies outside the Main Development Region for Atlantic tropical cyclone activity, though the island is occasionally affected by hurricanes and tropical storms.

=== Ecology ===
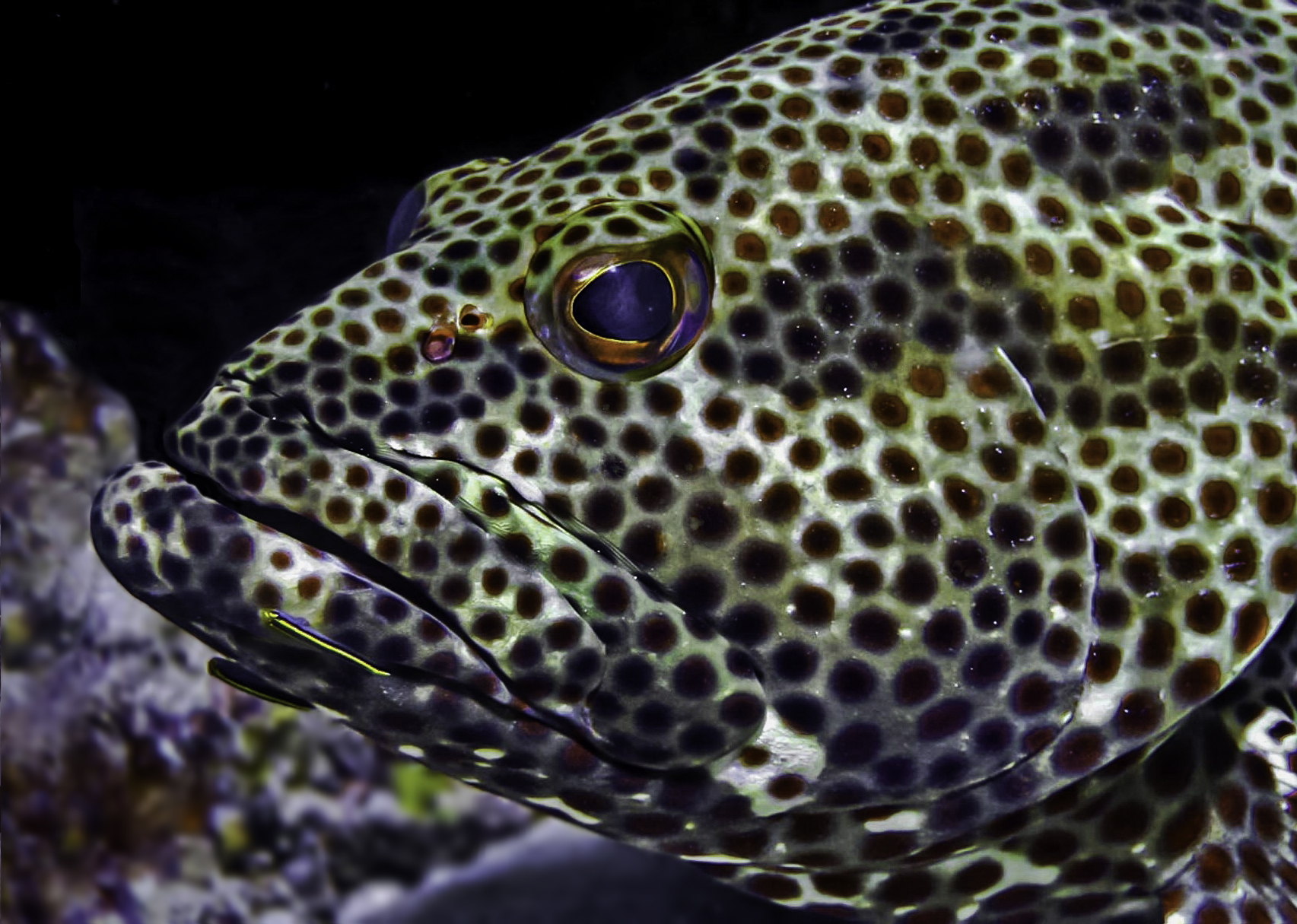
Rock hind in Bonaire

Bonaire is fringed by a coral reef which is accessible to divers from the shore along the lee side of the island (facing west-southwest). The entire coastline of the island was designated a marine sanctuary in 1979, an effort to preserve and protect the delicate coral reef and the marine life that depends on it. There are more than 350 species of fish and sixty species of coral living in Bonaire's reef. Boulder Star Coral (Montastraea annularis) is the most common coral, according to a 2011 survey. In 2011, biologists discovered a new species of jellyfish in Bonaire, the highly venomous Bonaire banded box jellyfish (Tamoya ohboya).

Bonaire is also famed for its flamingo populations and its donkey sanctuary. Flamingos are drawn to the brackish water of the island's lagoons, which harbor the shrimp upon which they feed. Bonaire is home to one of only four nesting grounds for the Caribbean flamingo. Located in the Pekelmeer in the southern part of the island, no human entry is permitted in this sanctuary. In the 16th century, Europeans introduced sheep, goats, pigs, horses and donkeys on Bonaire, and the descendants of the donkeys, goats, and pigs roam the island today.

Bonaire is also home to the ecologically vulnerable yellow-shouldered amazon parrot, Amazona barbadensis.

=== Environmental initiatives ===
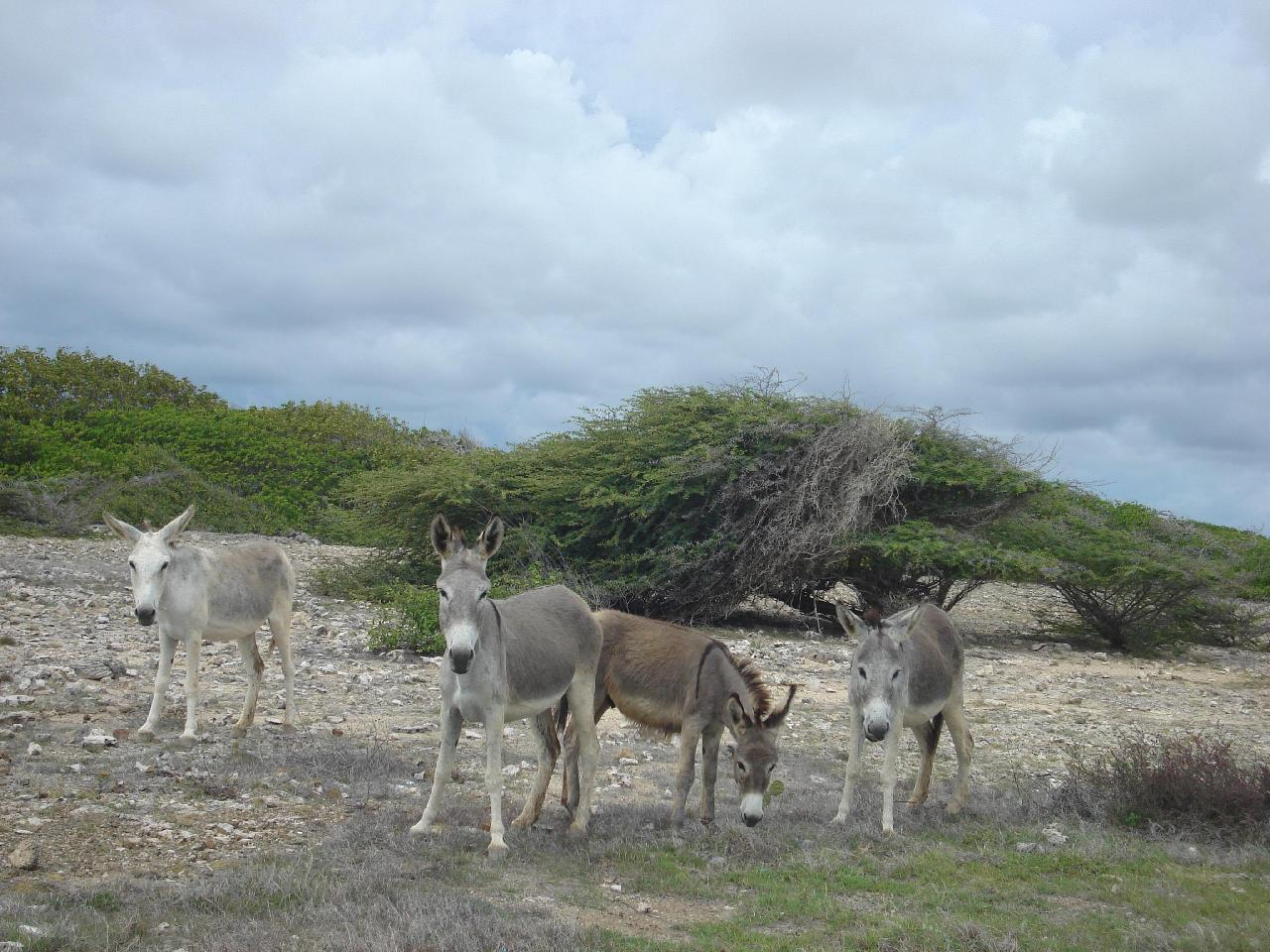
A donkey colony

The island of Bonaire has long been a leader in nature conservation and ecological responsibility. Bonaire's National Park Foundation (Stichting Nationale Parken or STINAPA), was founded in 1962 for the purpose of actively protecting nature on the island. In 1969 STINAPA succeeded in establishing both the flamingo nesting sanctuary and Washington National Park, the first such nature preserves in the Netherlands Antilles. In 1979, the Slagbaai plantation was added to the park, now known as Washington Slagbaai National Park (WSNP). The Bonaire National Marine Park (BNMP) was also established in 1979. The Marine Park consists of the whole coastline of Bonaire from the high-water mark down to a depth of 200 feet (61 m) and includes a large mangrove forest in Lac Bay. Lac Bay, Klein Bonaire, Pelkermeer, Slagbaai and Gotomeer are recognized as wetlands of international significance under the Ramsar Convention.

Due to a public-private sector partnership, programs are being developed to advance the local awareness and attitudes toward conservation and habitat preservation in order to proactively protect Bonaire's ecosystem. A new sewage treatment plant will contribute to protecting the reefs and the seawater quality. In 2013 Selibon, the national garbage-processing plant, opened at the Plaza Medio Ambiente recycling center, where the general public can bring glass, cans, paper, scrap metal, cardboard, batteries, motor oil, cooking oil, electronics, mobile phones and textiles.

The island is environmentally aware and protective of its coral reefs, the diversity of its aquatic ecosystems, and the conservation of its many species and natural environments above and below the water. The island's government, businesses and residents are committed to recycling waste products, and making others aware of the importance and benefits. Divers and dive shops take part in collecting debris washed ashore and preparing it for recycling.

Bonaire gets a significant amount of its electricity from an array of twelve wind generators along its northeastern coastline which began operating in 2010. This renewable source now fills 40–45% of the island's electricity needs. Work continues in developing additional renewable sources of energy, including bio-diesel and solar, with the goal of becoming 100% reliant on renewables.

=== Washington Slagbaai National Park ===
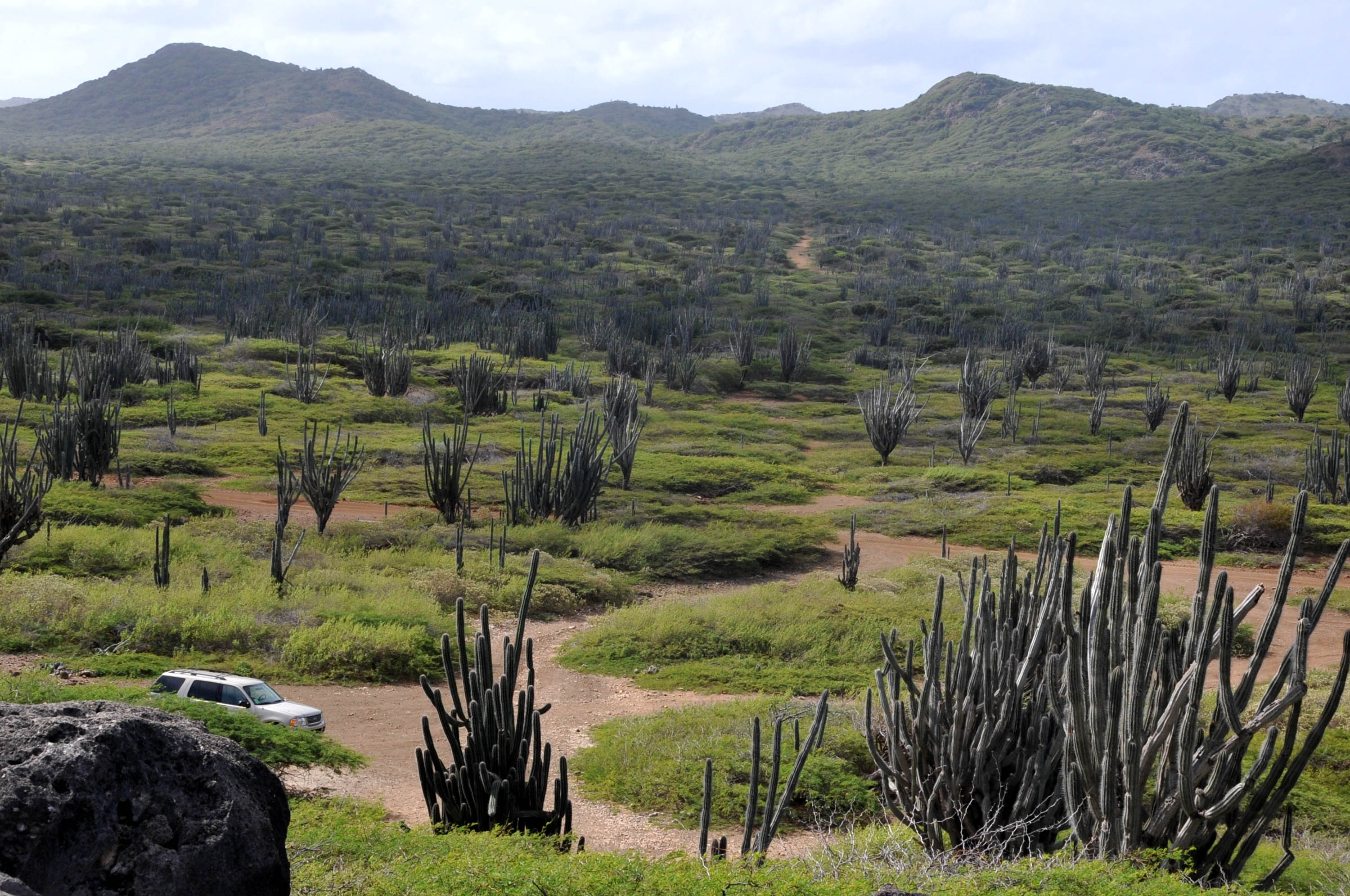
Washington Slagbaai National Park

Washington Slagbaai National Park is an ecological preserve on the northern tip of the island. The 6,000-hectare park was established in 1969 as the first nature park in the Netherlands Antilles. It is home to a wide variety of habitats, such as the bocas (inlets), dunes on the north coast, salt pans, pos (springs) and mountain areas.

The park is rich in birds and other animals, especially lizards, including iguanas. Within the park there are two areas recognised internationally as important wetlands under the Ramsar Convention: the Slagbaai salt marsh and Lake Gotom. The park is also of great cultural-historical importance, not least because of the plantations and the history of Slagbaai.

At the entrance to the park is the Bonaire Museum. From the entrance there are several signposted walks. The park is easily accessible by car and mountain bikers are also welcome. The highest point of Bonaire, Mount Brandaris, is 240 m (790 ft) tall and is located within this preserve. It has a complete view of the island.

=== Dos Pos ===
Adjacent to Washington Slagbaai National Park, Dos Pos is the former location of a planation. Dos Pos has been identified by BirdLife International as an Important Bird Area (IBA) because it supports populations of several threatened or restricted-range bird species. The landscape is one of small hills and sheltered valleys with remnant fruit trees, mainly mangoes, and a small ephemeral pond.

=== Washikemba–Fontein–Onima Important Bird Area ===
Located along the North-Eastern coast of the island, this 5,959 ha strip of land has also been identified as an Important Bird Area (IBA) by Birdlife International because it supports populations of several threatened or restricted-range bird species. The landscape includes three freshwater reservoirs as well as scrubland and some introduced fruit trees.

=== Bonaire National Marine Park ===
The Bonaire National Marine Park (BNMP) is a legally protected underwater park surrounding the entire islands of Bonaire and Klein Bonaire. The park was established in 1979 with the support of the World Wide Fund for Nature and others, and is managed by STINAPA. There are more than 80 dive sites in the marine park.

=== Klein Bonaire ===
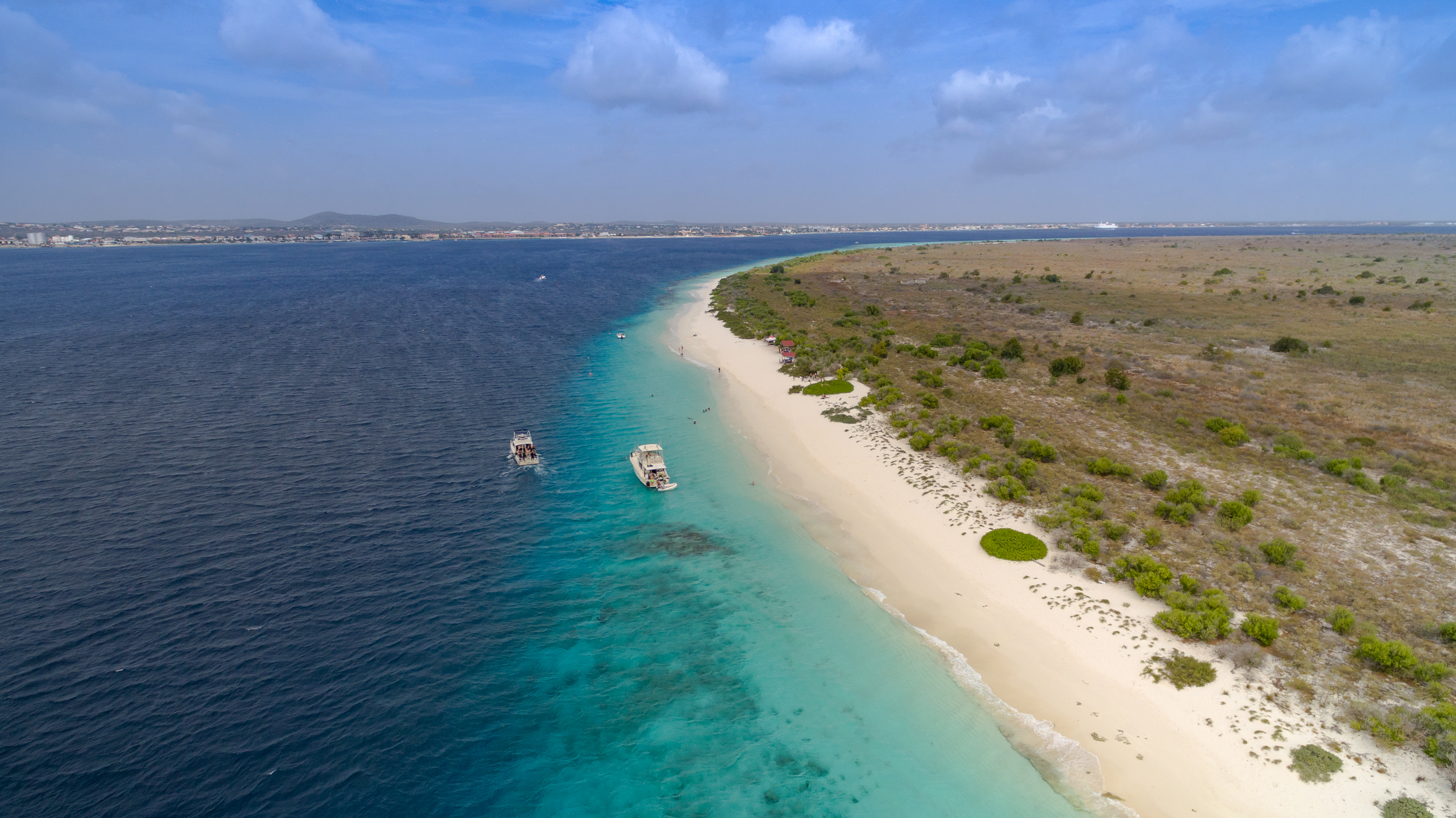
Coast of Klein Bonaire

Klein Bonaire (Dutch for "Little Bonaire") is an islet located off the western coast Bonaire, about a 0.5 mile from Kralendijk. The small island is 700 hectares (2.7 sq miles) in size. The island is accessible by boat for divers, snorkelers, and day-trippers.

The island is completely flat and covered with bushes, cacti, and small trees. There are at least 76 species of plants and about 55 species of animals on the island. The island is an important location for bats, sea turtles, and flamingos. Leptonycteris curasoae rely on Klein Bonaire for sources of nectar. Sea turtles rely on Klein Bonaire's beaches for nesting, especially those on the northeast side. Flamingos rely on Klein Bonaire's salt pans, where they feed. (Bonaire has one of the largest flamingo populations in the world).

The island is surrounded by fringing coral reefs. The reefs are home to more than 340 fish species, and almost every species of hard and soft coral found in the Caribbean. Its reefs and underwater wildlife make it a popular destination for divers, and it is surrounded by dive sites.

In the late 20th century, with the growth of diving tourism on Bonaire, project developers wanted to build hotels on Klein Bonaire. In 1999 the island was bought and safeguarded by the Island Territory of Bonaire with the help of the Netherlands, the World Wide Fund for Nature and other conservationists. Klein Bonaire has been a legally protected nature reserve since 2001, when it was incorporated as part of the Bonaire National Marine Park. The island is also protected as a wetland of international importance by the Ramsar Convention.

=== Lac Bay ===
Lac Bay is a shallow lagoon in the southeast of Bonaire. The 700 hectare area is surrounded by mangroves. The bay is part of the protected underwater park and has been designated an aquatic area of international importance under the Ramsar Convention. The bay is unique for the presence of seagrasses and mangroves. Part of the mangroves is virtually undisturbed due to limited accessibility, making it important as a resting area for bird species. Lac Bay is an important resting and nesting area for many marine birds and invertebrates, including the queen conch or Karkó. This mollusk used to be found in large numbers here, but overfishing has largely eradicated the population. The area serves as a nursery for reef fish and is the feeding ground for the green sea turtle.

=== Pekelmeer ===
Pekel Lake and the flamingo reserve (800 hectares) are part of the large aquatic area in the south-west of the island. Salt is still extracted from this area. It is also the most important feeding and living area for the flamingo. Depending on the season, between 2,000 and 7,000 flamingos can be found in this area. The flamingo reserve is the most important breeding site in the Southern Caribbean. The total population migrating between Bonaire and South America is estimated at 20,000 individuals. The flamingo places special demands on its environment (water quality, tranquillity) and is very sensitive to disturbance. The Pekelmeer and the flamingo reserve have been designated as a water area of international importance under the Ramsar Convention. Bonaire will continue to actively protect the flamingo, the symbol of the island.

=== Salt pans ===
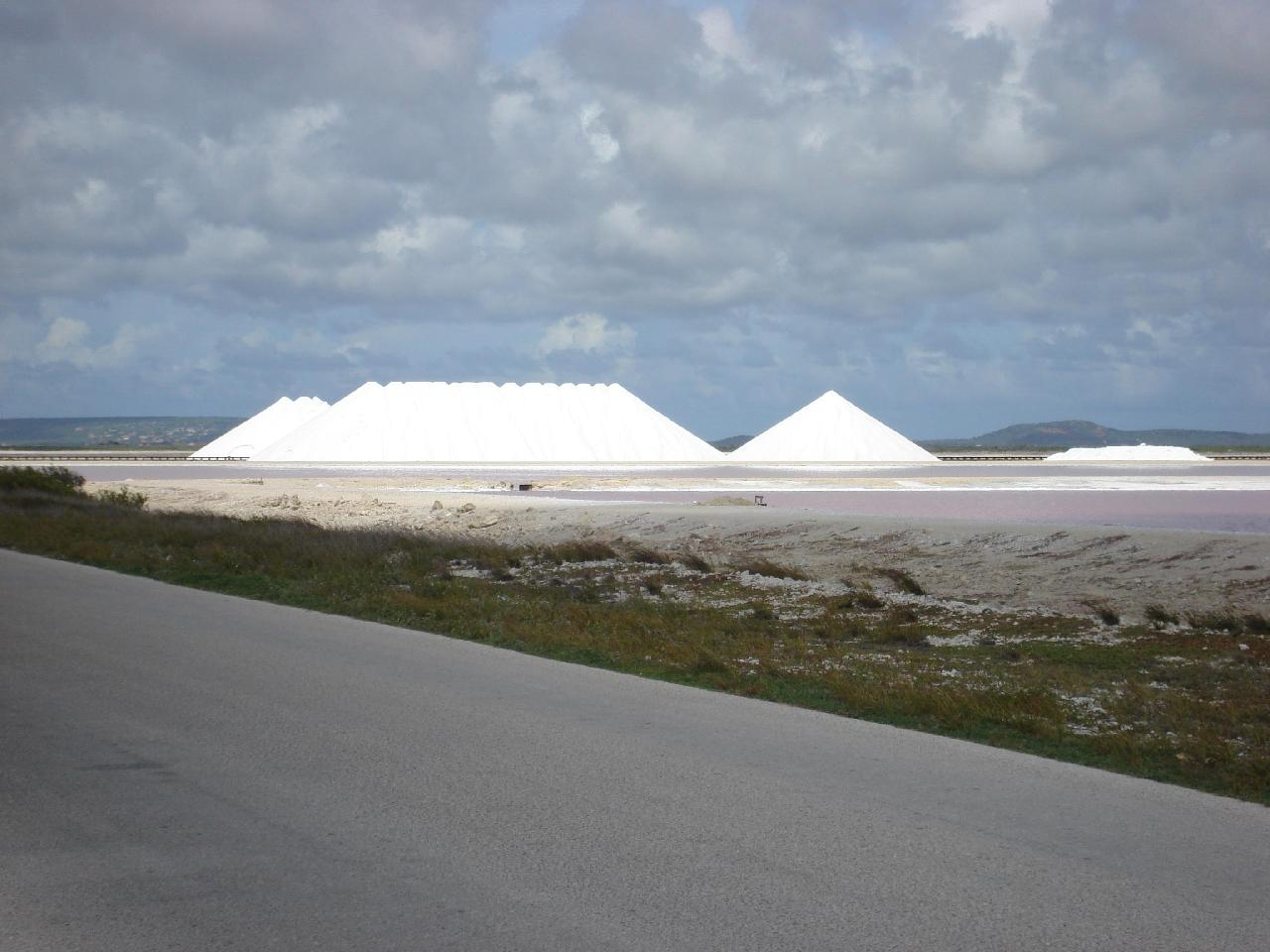
Cargill Salt, Bonaire

Bonaire is also known for its salt pans (also called salt lakes, salt flats, or saliñas), which cover 10% of the island's land. Salt pans are salt lakes or inlets that are closed to the sea by a dead coral dyke. They have an important function because they ensure the collection and filtration of rainwater. This prevents nutrients and soil particles from reaching the reef and causing damage to the corals. This function is especially crucial during heavy rainfall. The salt pans are also an important feeding ground for many waterbirds. Slagbaai, Gotomeer, Pekelmeer and the Klein Bonaire salt pans are aquatic areas of international importance in the context of the Ramsar Convention. Economically, the salt flats provide for the production and exportation of salt.

=== Caves ===
Bonaire has many dozens of caves. There are estimated to be over 200 caves on the island, though not all are easily accessible. As a geological manifestation they give a picture of the oldest history of the island. In several there are cave drawings made by the original inhabitants of Bonaire. Some caves are home to bats or the blind shrimp Typhlatya. Bats play a useful role in the ecosystem: they trap a large number of insects (including mosquitoes) or provide pollination of flowers, including cactus flowers. The greatest threat to bats is the destruction or disturbance of their roosts.

=== Southernmost point of the Netherlands ===
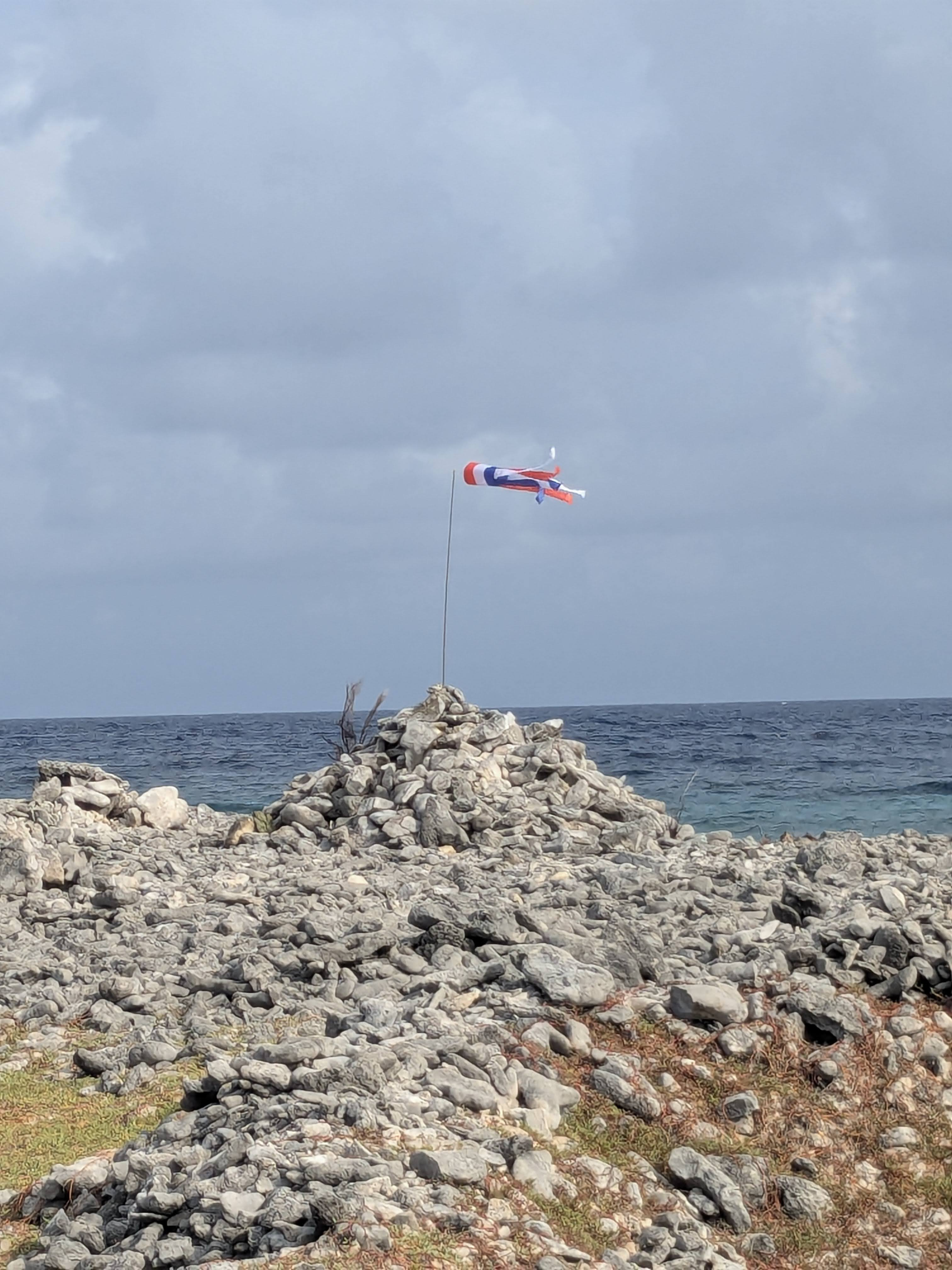
The Dutch flag at the southernmost point of the Netherlands, at the southern tip of Bonaire.

The southernmost point of the Netherlands is located at the southern tip of Bonaire, on the coast of the Caribbean Sea. As a special municipality of the Netherlands, Bonaire is the most southerly part of the country. The point is marked by a wind sock in the Dutch national colors (red, white, and blue). The rugged, rocky coastal landscape offers views over the open sea toward Venezuela, which lies approximately 90 kilometers to the south.

== Government ==
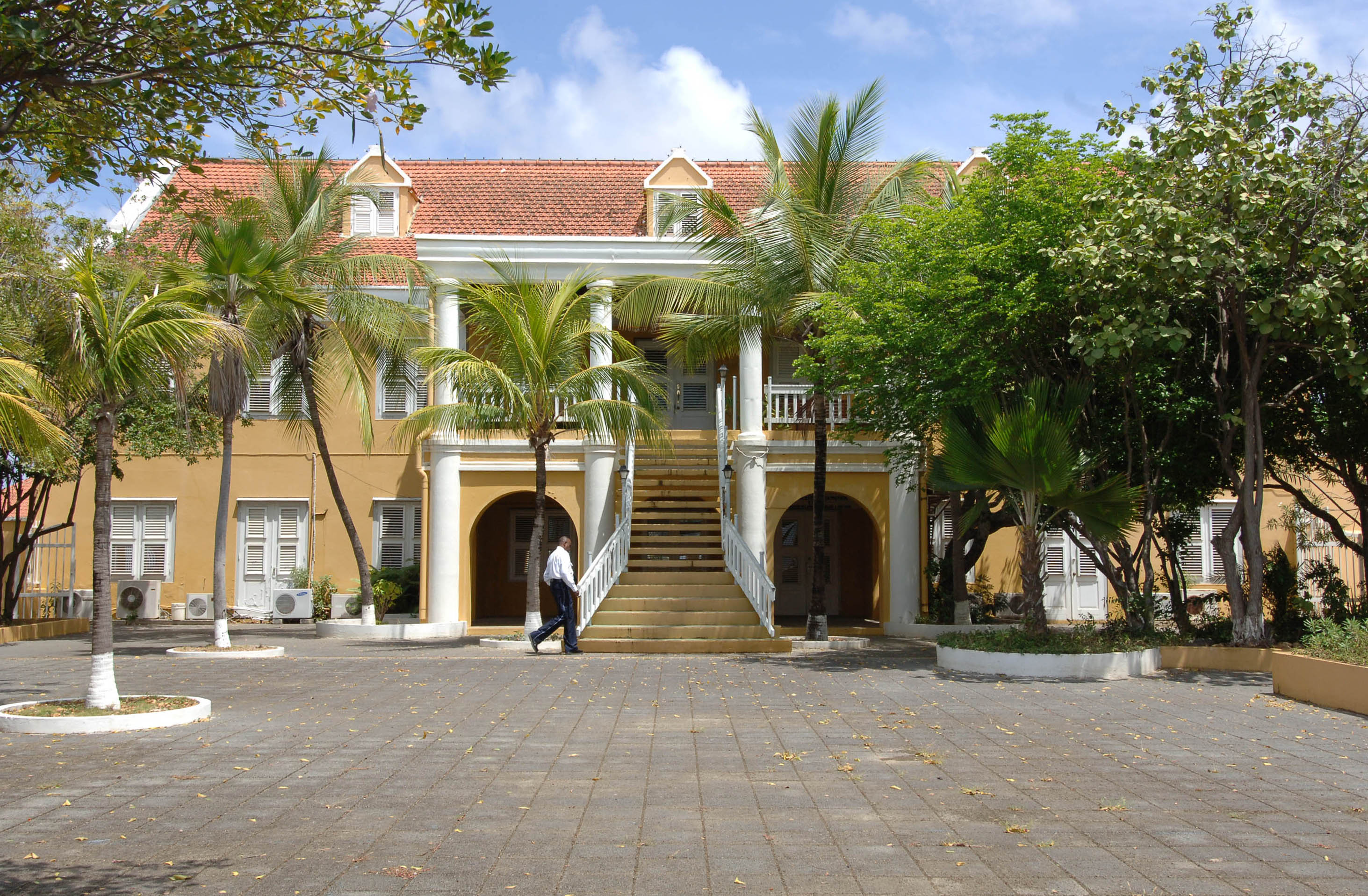
The local parliament and Council House in Kralendijk

=== Island Council ===
The island council is the local, democratically elected parliament. It is the highest governing body in the public body and is responsible for local legislation. Executive power is held by the Crown-appointed governor and the island deputies appointed by the island council. The Three main political parties are the Bonaire People's Movement led by Elvis Tjin Asjoe, the Bonaire Patriotic Union led by Esther Bernabela and the Bonaire Democratic Party led by Clark Abraham. Smaller parties include Movement 21 and Bonaire Social Party

=== History ===
Before October 2010, Bonaire was part of a single constituent country called the Netherlands Antilles. This country also included the islands of Curaçao, St Eustatius, St Maarten and Saba. Aruba, the remaining Dutch Caribbean island, had seceded from the Netherlands Antilles in the 1980s. The Netherlands Antilees was a parliamentary democracy based on the Dutch system of government. Free elections were held every four years.

Bonaire, Curaçao, St Maarten and Saba – four of the five islands – disagreed about their political future and so advocated for their respective separations from the Netherlands Antilles. Some of the island residents wanted autonomy while others wanted more integration with the Netherlands.

In 2005, a conference was held by the governments of the Netherlands, Aruba and the Netherlands Antilles to discuss future constitutional reform and the potential dissolution of the Netherlands Antilles. In 2006, Sint Maarten and Curaçao chose autonomy, and Bonaire, St. Eustatius and Saba opted for a closer relationship with the Netherlands. Following the conference, constitutional referendums were to be held, and dismantlement of the Netherlands Antilles was scheduled to take place in 2010.

A referendum for Bonaire was scheduled for 26 March 2010. The original referendum proposal limited voting to Dutch nationals who arrived on the island before 1 January 2007. This clause was criticised by a United Nations delegation, which visited the island, for unreasonably restricting voting rights. As a result, in February 2010 the Governor of the Netherlands Antilles, Frits Goedgedrag, decided to cancel it. It was postponed to September, and then October 2010.

Eventually the referendum was held on 17 December 2010, with 84% voting in favor of becoming part of the Netherlands. However, as the 35% voter turnout rate was below the required 51%, the results of the referendum were declared invalid.

=== Judicial Institution and prison ===
The Judicial Institution (JI) of the Dutch Caribbean (Justitiële Inrichting Caribisch Nederland, Papiamento: Institushon Hudisial Karibe Hulandes, Boneiru site.) is located in Kralendijk, Bonaire. Since 10 October 2010, the centre has been under the responsibility of the Department of Judicial Institutions (DJI). The DJI is the Dutch agency for the execution of sentences and custodial measures and sits within the Ministry of Justice and Security. Since 6 December 2010 there is capacity for 76 men, women and juveniles. The name in Papiamentu is Institushon Hudisial Karibe Hulandes, Boneiru site.

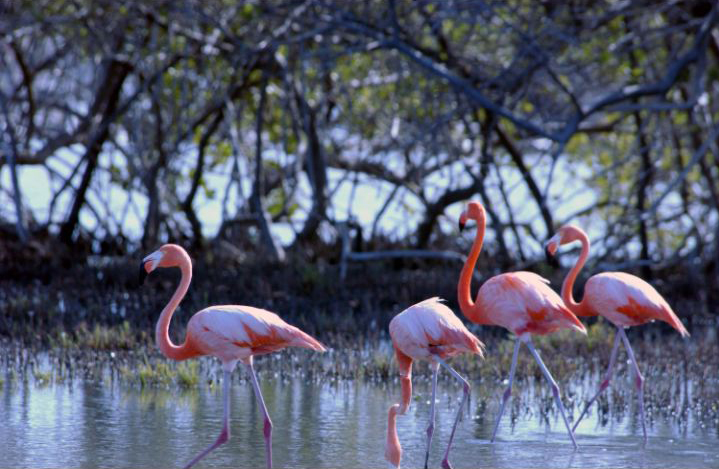
American flamingos at the sanctuary at the southern end of Bonaire

=== Tourism ===
Bonaire's economy is mainly based on tourism, taking advantage of its warm, dry climate and natural environment. The island caters to scuba divers and snorkelers, as the surrounding coral reefs are well preserved and easily accessible from the shore. Bonaire has been widely recognized for many years in the diving community as one of the world's best shore diving destinations.

STINAPA, Bonaire's National Marine Park Foundation, describes a total of 89 named dive sites. The guidebook created by Reef Smart Guides in 2018, places the total number of dive sites at 97 when unofficial sites are included. Bonaire's reefs are home to over 57 species of soft and stony coral and more than 350 recorded fish species. Most resorts and hotels have an on-site dive shop, and other accommodations are affiliated with a dive operation. The license plates carry the logo Diver's Paradise (in English).

Lac Bay, in the southeastern part of the island, attracts wind surfers from around the world to Bonaire. The shallow Bay is on the windward side of the island, so trade winds are strong and constant. A barrier reef across the mouth of the bay allows windsurfers of all skill levels to select wave conditions they like. Lac Bay is one of the stops in the PWA Windsurfing Freestyle World Cup and has hosted the Prokids IFCA Championship. Five of the PWA's ten highest ranked freestyle windsurfers are from Bonaire: Kiri Thode, Amado Vrieswijk, Bjorn Saragoza, Tonky Frans and Taty Frans. In the northern end of Lac Bay is one of the best preserved mangrove forests in the Caribbean, which is popular for kayaking and snorkelling.

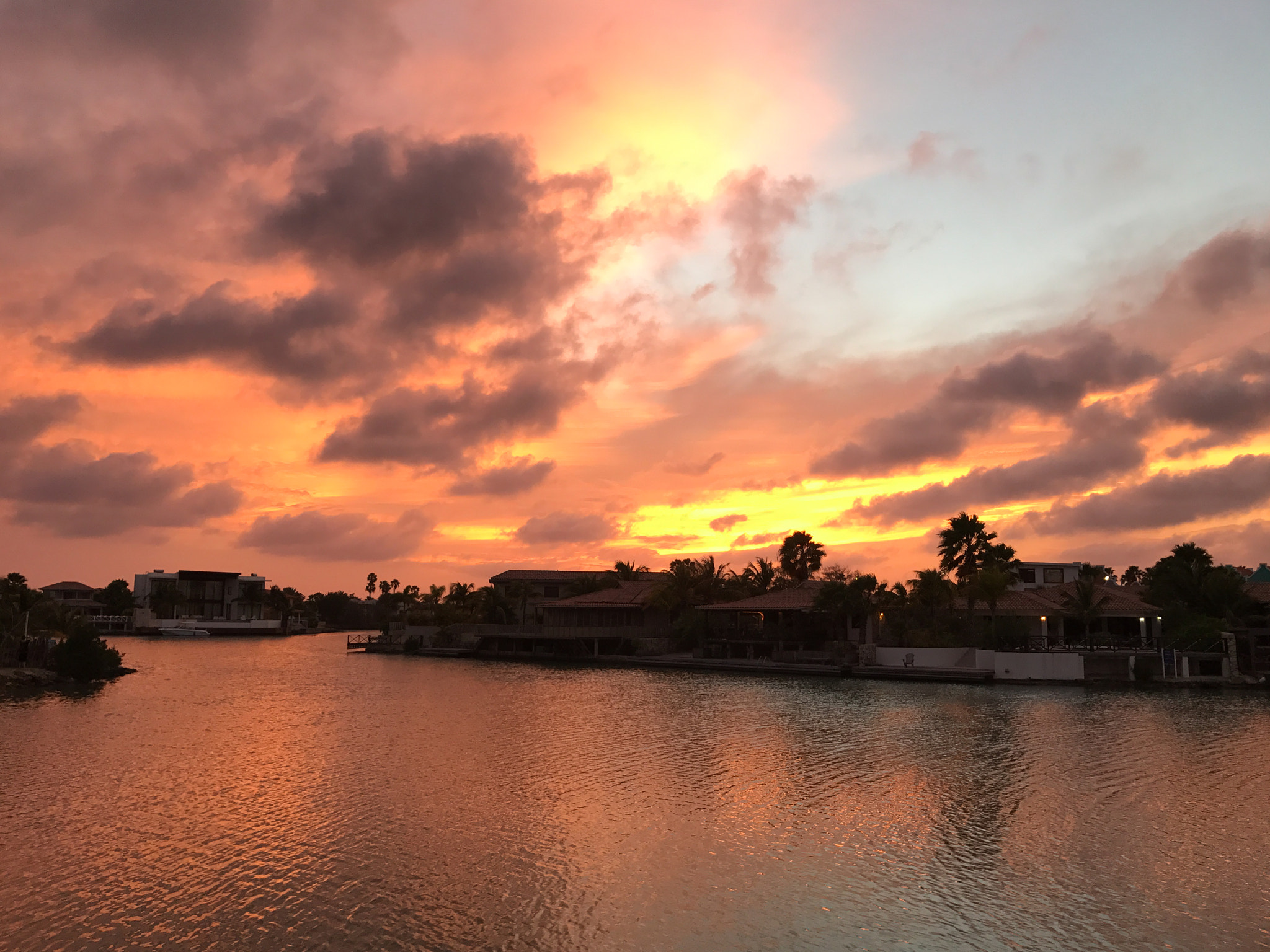
Sunset In Bonaire

Bonaire is also a port of call for more than fifteen cruise lines who make more than eighty calls per season at the island. The total passenger capacity for cruise ships in Bonaire is about 185,000.

Tourism infrastructure in Bonaire is contemporary and offers a variety of types of accommodations including hotels, full-service resorts, a few small bed and breakfasts and self-catering vacation rentals of all kinds. Other tourist activities include kite-boarding, windsurfing, mountain-biking, hiking, sailing, charter fishing, boating and bird-watching. All-in-all tourist expenditures in Bonaire are estimated at $125 million per year.

=== Currency ===
In 2011 the BES Islands replaced their currency, the Netherlands Antillean guilder (ISO 4217: ANG, symbol: ƒ), with the US dollar rather than replacing it with the euro which is used in the European Netherlands. The decision was based primarily on the needs for tourism and trade. Most countries and territories in the Caribbean use the dollar as their currency or have a currency linked to the dollar as legal tender. The guilder was pegged to the US dollar for decades with an exchange rate of ƒ1.79 = US$1.00. Adopting the dollar put an end to the dual-currency payment system and foreign exchange charges. The guilder remained in use in Curaçao and Sint Maarten.

=== Taxation ===
The separate tax regimes for Bonaire, St Eustatius and Saba present a greater risk of double taxation or double exemption from taxes. In an effort to remove the risk, two plans were introduced. One plan prevents double taxation between the Netherlands (Europe) and the BES Islands while the other prevents double taxation between the BES Islands and third countries. The new regime will generate a total annual tax revenue estimated at $52 million which is equal to the current tax revenues on the three islands. The combined population of the three islands is about 20,000; about half of these pay income tax.

== Economy ==
=== Salt production ===
Utilizing the naturally low-lying geography and traditional Dutch dike design, much of Bonaire's southern half has been made into a giant system of ponds and pools which evaporate seawater to produce salt. Presently operated by Cargill, Bonaire's solar salt works produces 400,000 tonnes of industrial grade salt per year. After collection, the salt is then washed and stored in pyramid-shaped piles roughly 15 metres in height, each containing approximately 10,000 tonnes of 99.6 percent pure salt. The salt facility operates its own pier where ships are loaded with salt destined for North American, European and Western Pacific markets. Bonaire's salt is used primarily in industry.

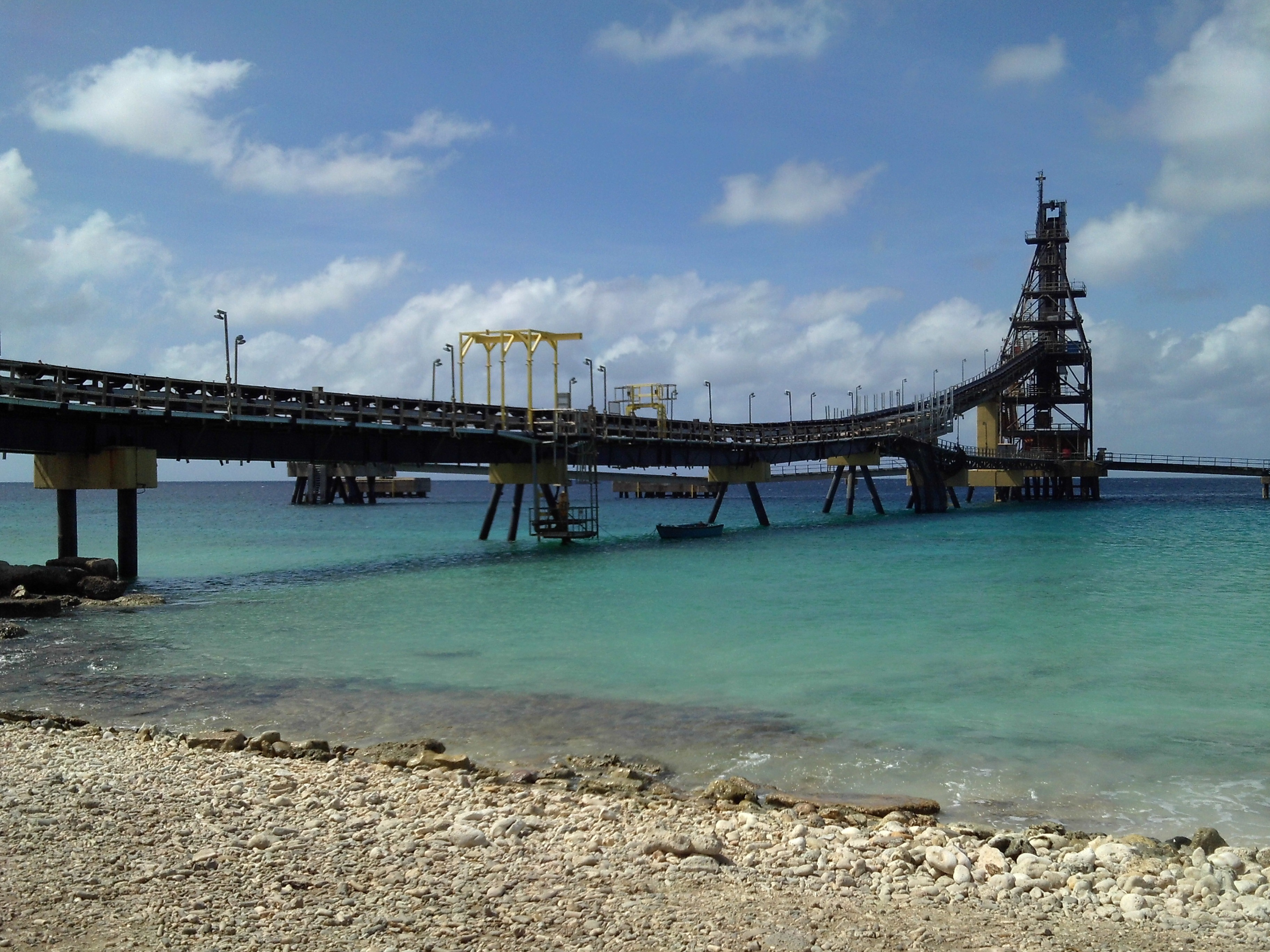
Bonaire Salt Pier

The large condensing ponds which ring the crystallizer basins, called the Pekelmeer, are a natural habitat for numerous species of brine shrimp which in turn feed flocks of hundreds of pink flamingoes and other migratory birds. This is the location of Bonaire's flamingo sanctuary.

=== Oil storage and shipment ===
The Bonaire Petroleum Corporation (BOPEC) is a fuel oil storage and transshipment terminal on Bonaire. BOPEC is wholly owned by Venezuelan oil company PDVSA, and functions primarily as a storage facility for multiple grades of refined and non-refined oils from Venezuela and refineries on Curaçao and Aruba. BOPEC also has mixing and blending capabilities for its stored fuels. BOPEC's #1 pier can receive tankers up to 500,000DWT, which means there are only seven ships in the world that are too big for the BOPEC terminal. A fire at the BOPEC terminal in 2010 is believed to have had a significant impact on Goto Lake and at least one other nearby lagoon.

=== Plantations and plantation houses ===
In 1868 and 1870, a large part of the government land was auctioned and sold. These included five lots for forestry and livestock farming and nine lots for salt exploitation. The buyers of these large lots were mainly wealthy people from Curaçao, successful merchants, who had no intention of living on their plantations. There are no real plantations on Bonaire. The climate and soil conditions on Bonaire are not very favourable for the cultivation of fruits and vegetables of any size. Only salt extraction is economically attractive. In addition, on some "plantations" aloe cultivation (last exported in 1973), maize cultivation (due to drought there was not enough harvest every year), charcoal burning and cattle breeding (mainly goats, last exported in 1970) were carried out.

In the early 20th century, Bonaire's middle class was also able to buy plantation land. On Curaçao, the land house served as the main house of a plantation, where the owner lived. In the immediate vicinity were outbuildings, barns, stables and corrals. Surrounding it were the slave dwellings. On Bonaire, the plantation houses became the owners' cottages, where they stayed during the weekends. Often during the week there was an overseer (vito) who supervised the work on the plantation.

== Transportation ==
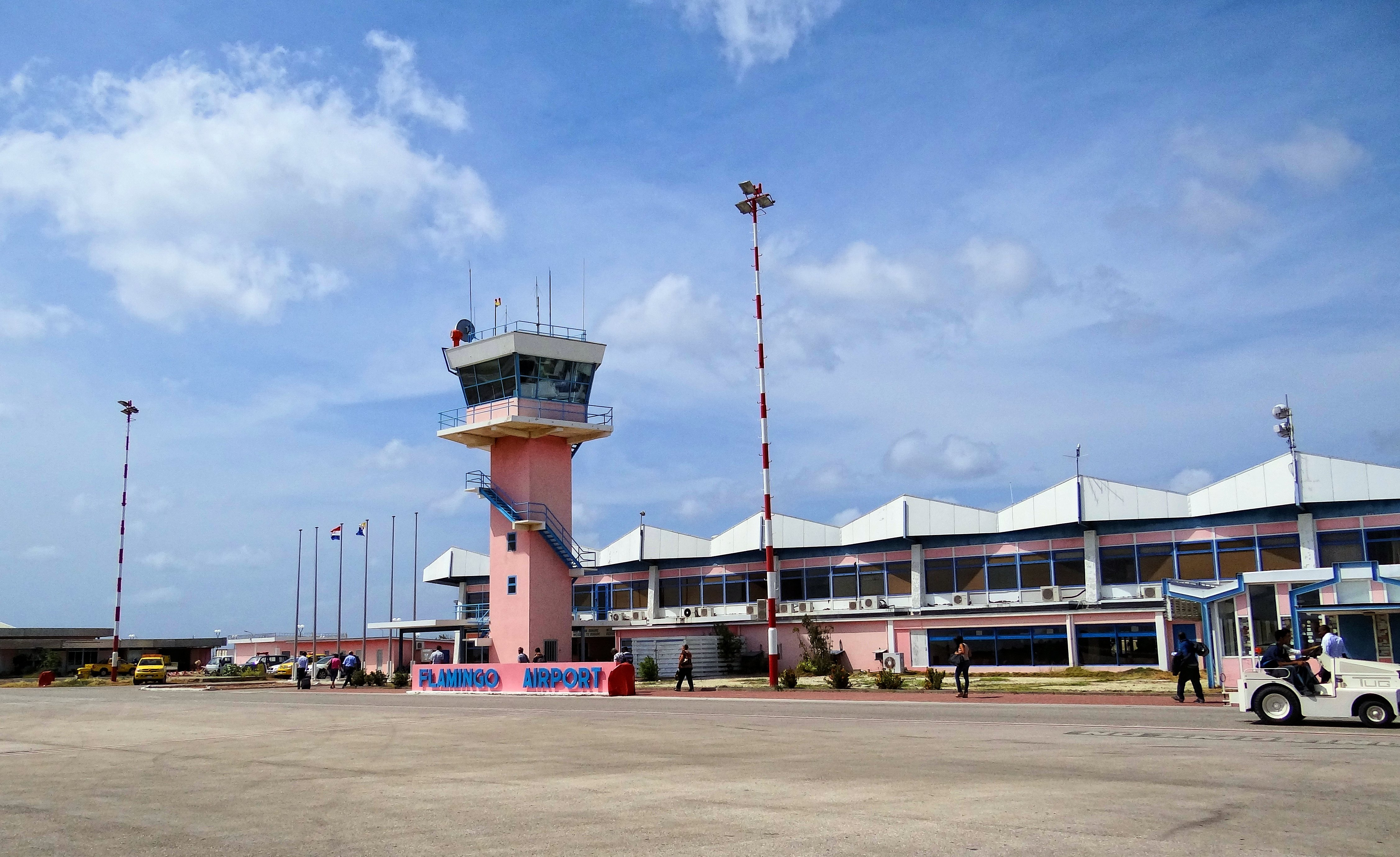
Flamingo Airport

Bonaire's first airport was located near Tra'i Montaña Subi Blanku and crossed the current path from Kralendijk to Rincon. It was built in 1936. The airport proved to be too small when American soldiers arrived on Bonaire in the second half of 1943. The commander stated that a new airport had to be built. Construction began in December 1943, with the new "Flamingo Airport" opening in 1945. A small terminal was built that was suitable for the number of passengers at the time. This building was used until mid-1976. The airport had received many extensions of both the runway and the terminal itself.

Today the airport is known as Flamingo International Airport and is served by a variety of both domestic and international airlines. Services from the US include Delta Air Lines, American Airlines, JetBlue Airways and United Airlines. Airlines providing European service include TUI Netherlands and KLM. Consistent air service from Curaçao is provided by Divi Divi Air and EZ Air.

The airport is equipped with a fire station, control tower and hangar. Plans are under way for modifications to the current airport facilities, the runway and the fire station.

== Settlements ==
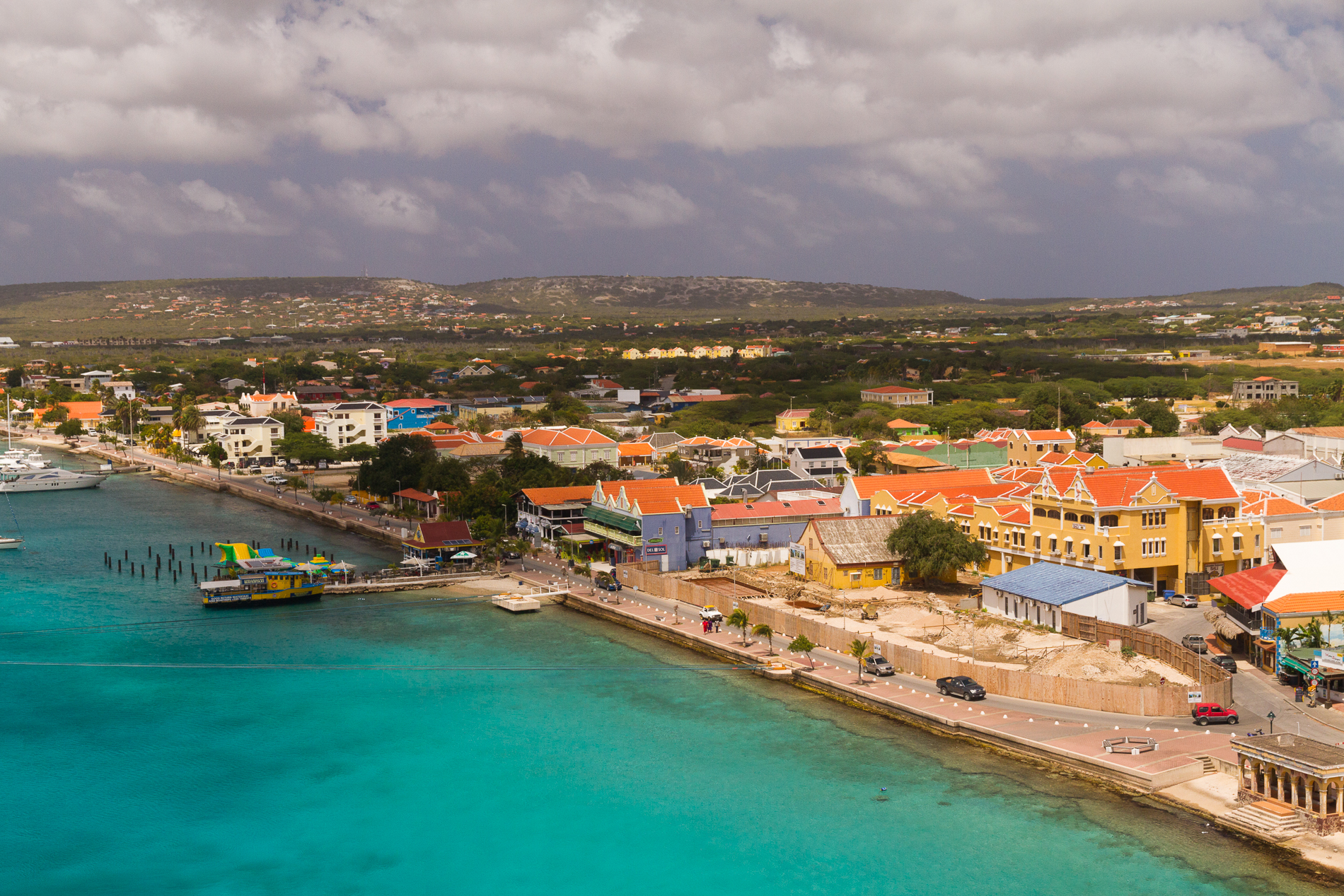
Bonaire coast

The two towns on the island are Kralendijk (the capital) and Rincon. Kralendijk has many suburbs/neighbourhoods, although on an island with such a small population, the distinction is not always clearcut.

The town of Kralendijk is a result of a merger of six villages: Antriol (Entrejol), Nikiboko, Noord Saliña, Playa, Leeuwarden and Tera Kora. The town of Rincon is the only other town.

Labra, Ishiri, Kokorobi, Jan Doran, Vlijt, Rigot, Porto Spano and Kunchi were several smaller towns that had existed in the national park but were later abandoned.

== Demographics ==
The population was estimated to be 25,133 in 2024, but has since risen to 26,552 by the start of 2025.

The majority of Bonaire's population is of African or mixed Afro-European descent. However, a significant part of the population has a variety of origins, including from Curaçao, the Netherlands, the Dominican Republic, Venezuela, Colombia, Aruba, Suriname, the United States and China, among many others.

Age Sex Pyramid

=== Main population centres ===
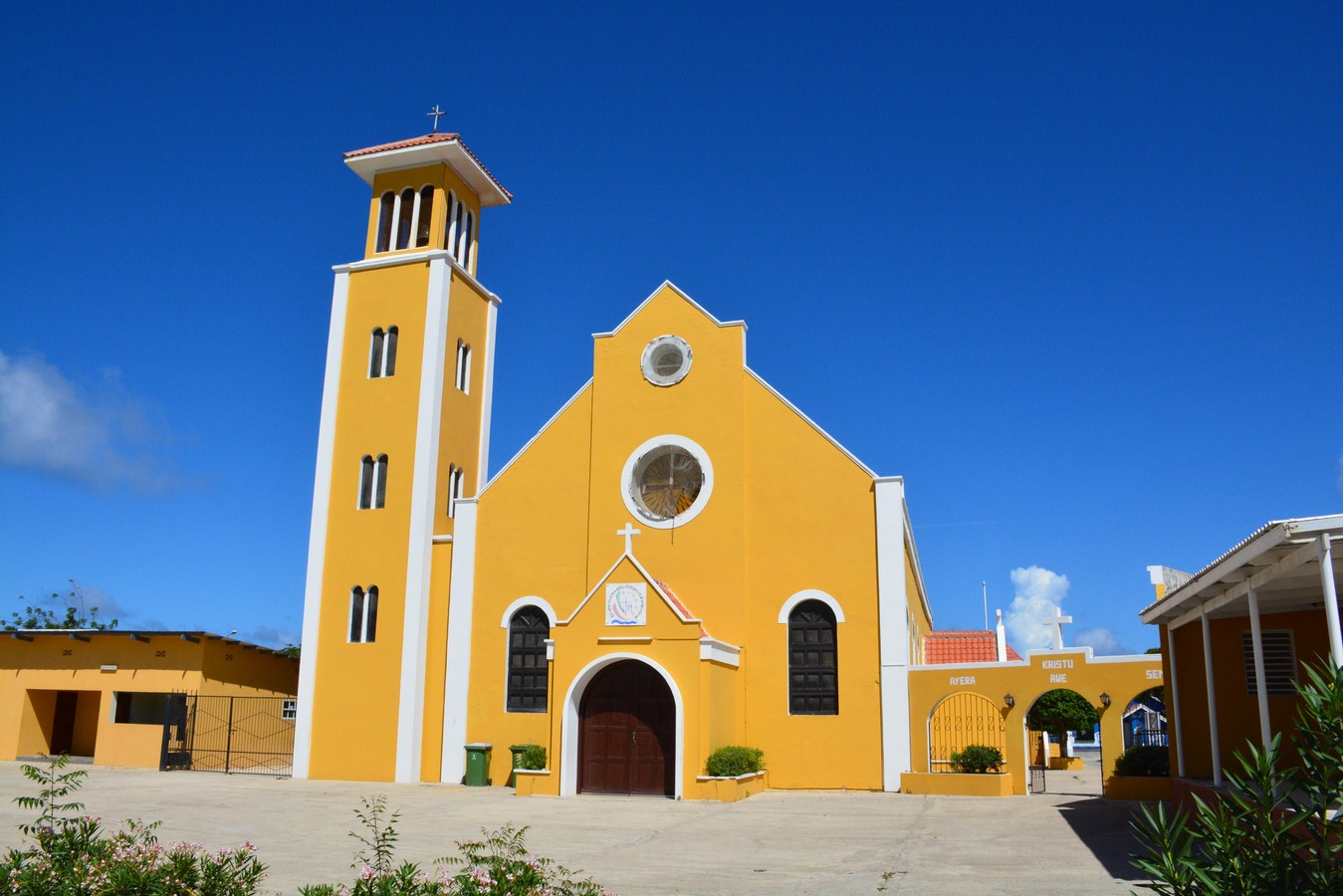
St. Louis Bertrand a Catholic church in Rincon, Bonaire

The star on Bonaire's flag has six points, representing the six original settlements. Due to population growth and building expansion, five of them have grown together with the capital Kralendijk (with over 26,000 inhabitants at the start of 2025, including the new districts). Only Rincon, the oldest settlement on the island, located in the northern half with some 1,900 inhabitants, remains an independent village. In addition to these nuclei, a number of new districts have been added over the years. Behind Kralendijk, against the hill, are the Republiek and Santa Barbara districts. Behind Santa Barbara, on the coast, is the luxurious new district of Sabadeco (Santa Barbara Development Corporation). Beyond the airport, in the direction of the salt flats, is the neighbourhood of Belnem, named after Harry Belafonte. The population as of 2017 is distributed in the old towns and districts as follows:

Population statistics 2017
Name	Population
Kralendijk	10,620
Playa (centre of Kralendijk)	2,571
Tera Kora	1,568
Nikiboko	3,058
Antriol	3,811
Nort di Saliña	1,217
Rincon	1,875

=== Religion ===
As in the rest of the former Netherlands Antilles, Christianity is the predominant religion of Bonaire. Roman Catholicism is the faith of the majority (68%) of the population, and there are also Protestant minorities. Catholicism was introduced during the period of Spanish rule. Although the island would pass under the control of the Protestant Netherlands, Catholicism remained the principal island religion. Ecclesiastically, the churches on Bonaire depend on the Catholic diocese of Willemstad on the neighboring island of Curaçao.

After the discovery of Bonaire by Alonso de Ojeda in 1499, the spiritual life of the Christians was in the hands of the monks who came from Venezuela for baptisms. These missionaries belonged to the Jesuits of the Franciscan order. The first resident priest was Jacob Bernardus Eisenbel (Dutch), who came from Aruba to settle for several years in Bonaire and after whom the Parish of St. Bernard, the main Catholic church of the capital of Bonaire, Kralendijk, is named.

Rincon, Bonaire's second largest city, offers numerous regular festivals, including the annual Simadan (harvest) festivals and Dia di San Juan (St. John's Day).

Religion in Bonaire (2014):
1. Roman Catholic (68.0%)
2. Protestant (16.0%)
3. Other religion (4.00%)
4. No denomination (12.0%)

Bonaire also has an Islamic centre and a Jewish community.

=== Education ===
Bonaire's educational system is patterned after the Dutch system. Early grades are taught solely in Papiamentu, with more and more Dutch being introduced as the grade level progresses.

Scholengemeenschap Bonaire serves as Bonaire's secondary school, for ages 12–18.

=== Languages ===
First languages of Bonaireans (2021)
Languages	Percent
Papiamentu	62.4%
Spanish	15.4%
Dutch	15.0%
English	5.6%
Other	1.7%

Languages spoken in Bonaire (2021)
Languages	Percent
Papiamentu	88.4%
English	76.9%
Dutch	76.6%
Spanish	76.0%
Other	10.9%

As Bonaire is part of the Netherlands, Dutch is the official language, and the sole language for all administration and legal matters. However, as of 2017 it is the main language of only 15% of the population — around two thirds, or the majority of Bonaire's population, use the creole language of Papiamentu as their main language.

In January 2024 the insular council of Bonaire passed a motion to declare Papiamento a regional language of Bonaire under the European Charter for Regional and Minority Languages and the Minister of Foreign Affairs of the Kingdom of the Netherlands said that this decision would be implemented.

In the 2001 census, Dutch was the main language of only 8.8% of the population, in 2024 this tripled and is now around 25%. The most widely spoken language was Papiamentu, the primary language of 60% of the populace and is recognized by the government. Spanish was the main language of 11.8% of the people, English the primary language of 2.8%, and other languages accounted for 1.8%. Bonaire is a polyglot society, with most of Bonaire's population able to converse in Papiamentu, Dutch, English and Spanish.

== Sports ==
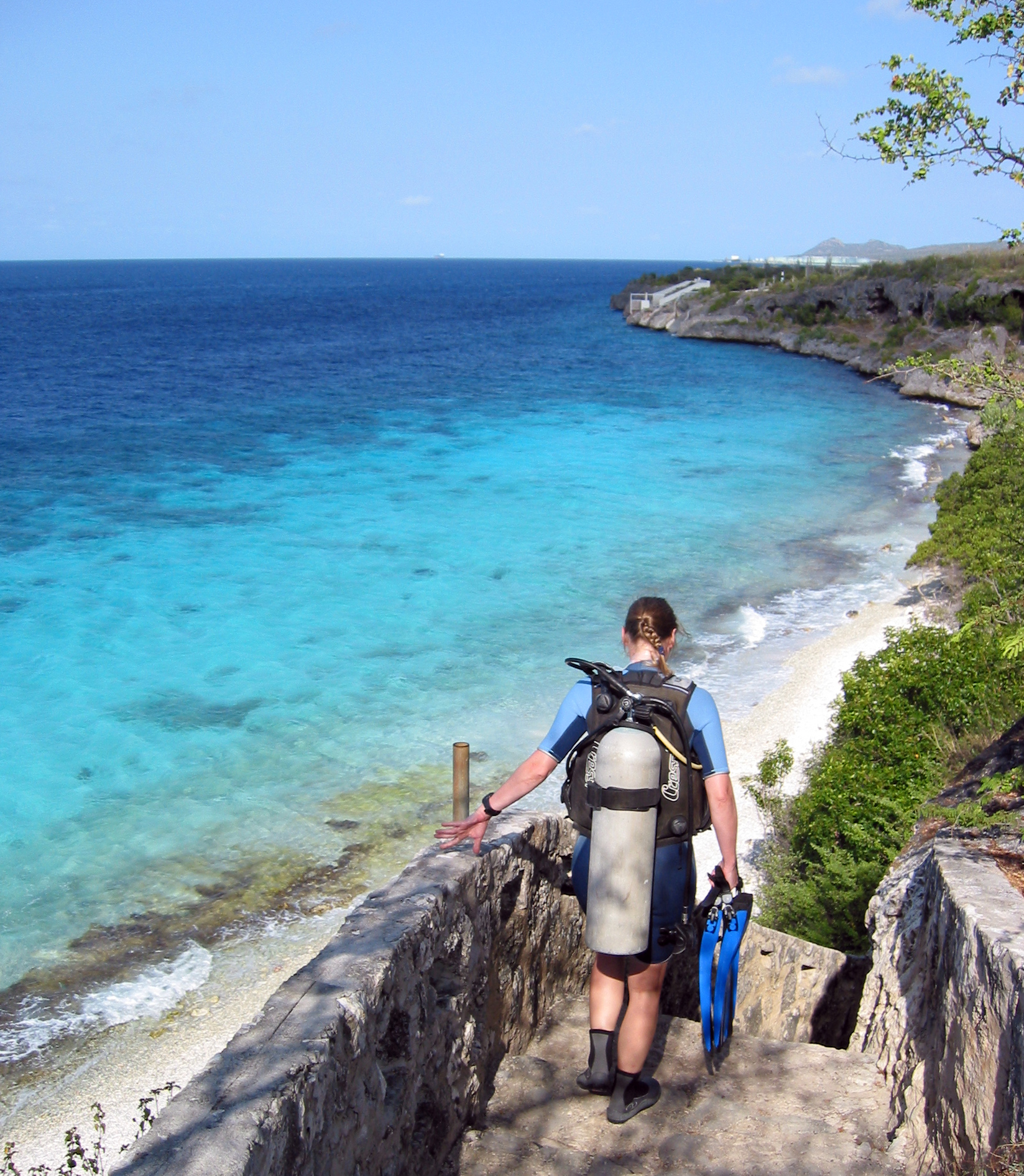
Bonaire is a popular tourist destination for both recreational diving and snorkelling

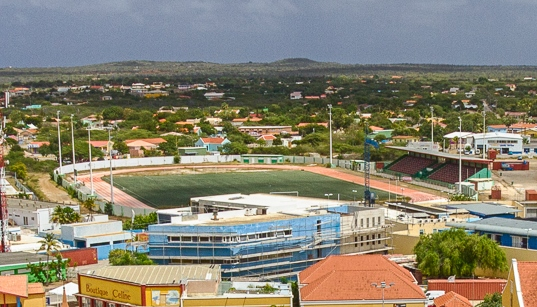
Kralendijk Stadium After Renovations

Bonaire residents participate in numerous sporting events, including all the popular sports that attract tourists to the island such as scuba diving, sailing, fishing, boating, windsurfing, kite surfing, biking, baseball, association football, volleyball and tennis. There are multiple dive shops on Bonaire, most of which offer scuba instruction and PADI, NAUI, SSI and CMAS certification. The island's dive shops typically offer scuba tank and dive gear rental, boat diving excursions, snorkeling, kayaking, and naturalist classes. Some dive shops have gas blending stations, and offer tec diving instruction and excursions.

Bonaire hosted the PWA Bonaire World Cup 2014 and the 10th Prokids IFCA Championship 2014 at Lac Bay in Sorobon on the east side of the island. It is home to several professional windsurfing champions. The island is also home to the annual Bonaire Sailing Regatta, a national sailing competition and celebration that has been held every October in Playa. The event first began in 1967 when Captain Don Stewart challenged Hubert Domacasse to a race, wagering 27 cases of beer that his fishing boat "Sislin" was faster than Domacasse's fishing boat "Velia". The races are run between the Leeward side of the island and Klein Bonaire.

The Bonaire Football Federation is a member of CONCACAF and the Bonaire Volleyball Federation is an associate member of CAZOVA (Caribbean Zonal Volleyball Association) and NORCECA. The Baseball teams play in the Caribbean region of Little league and Pony league. Bonaire was also confirmed as the 218th Table Tennis National association.

== Media ==
=== Radio ===
Trans World Radio (TWR) first established its AM broadcasting site on the island of Bonaire in 1964 to broadcast Christian programs into Latin America and the Caribbean. The programs were broadcast in Spanish, Dutch and English. TWR-Bonaire began their operation with three transmitters, including a Brown-Boveri medium wave transmitter (500 kW over 800 kHz) and two shortwave transmitters (200 kW and 50 kW); however, their license to operate the 500 kW transmitter was revoked in 1999 thereby restricting broadcast to 100 kW. The Brown-Boveri medium wave transmitter was sold and removed from the island. It was replaced with another medium wave transmitter (PJB3-AM). In 2012, TWR-Bonaire was permitted to increase its power from 100 kW to 450 kW but in order to do so, they had to raise 38 million euros (US$43,456,610.00). In 2016 they commissioned Kintronic Labs to build a four-mast, 231 metres (758 ft) parallel-array directional antenna system. On 31 January 2018, they acquired a 450 kW Nautel Broadcast medium wave transmitter for US$3.8 million, and the name changed from Trans World Radio to Shine 800 AM.

Radio Netherlands Worldwide operated a shortwave relay station at 12°12′48″N 68°19′23″W. Because of widespread availability of internet links providing higher audio quality and more flexibility, shortwave broadcasts by RNW-Bonaire were discontinued and at the end of October 2012, the radio station was closed and installations dismantled.

Bonaire has two island radio stations that broadcast general information: Bon FM and Radiodifucion Boneriano. The language spoken for both is Papiamentu.

=== Internet and newspapers ===
There are several internet news sources including BES Reporter in English, Bonaire in Papiamentu and Dutch, Bonaire Nieuws in Dutch, and Info Bonaire in English. The local newspapers, some of which are also available online, include The Bonaire Reporter in English, Extra and Boneriano in Papiamentu, Bonaire Times in English, Spanish and Dutch, and two Dutch newspapers: Amigoe and Antilliaans Dagblad.

=== Television ===
Flamingo Television Bonaire B.V. offers cable programming and internet access via cable connection or fiber optics. Local and regional programming is offered in different languages including Papiamentu, Spanish, Dutch and Chinese. English channels are made available through the efforts of a unified group of cable companies comprising the Caribbean Cable Cooperative Ltd.

Digital television programs and internet access are offered by Telbo N.V., a communication and media provider with an IP based infrastructure. They are the primary telephone service provider, and also offer various packages of high quality digital television programs with 130+ digital channels.

Residents of Bonaire receive some of Venezuela's main national television channels, all primarily in Spanish.

== Symbols ==
=== Flag ===
The flag, with the six-pointed star, symbolises a compass. The people of Bonaire are skilled fishermen and sailors. It is also said that the four points of the ring indicating East, West, South and North are intended to indicate that all people in the world are equal, regardless of where they come from. The red colour refers to the blood and the survivability of the people of Bonaire. Yellow represents the sun, the beach and the flowers of the Kibrahachi and the cactus. White represents peace and internationalisation. Blue represents the sea. The flag has not existed for a long time. It was only on 11 December 1981 that the design was approved, to which the whole population was able to contribute and give its opinion.
