= Reef Smart Guides =

Canadian mapping company

Reef Smart Inc.
- Type: marine mapping
- Industry: tourism
- Founded: 2016
- Headquarters: Montreal, Quebec, Canada
- Products: physical and digital maps
- Website: www.reefsmartguides.com

Reef Smart Guides, sometimes referred to as Reef Smart, is a Canadian corporation established in 2016 and based in Montreal, Quebec. The company creates digital 3D models of recreational dive and snorkel sites using photogrammetry, which have revolutionized the way scuba divers and snorkelers explore and understand marine ecosystems, particularly coral reefs. Reef Smart’s 3D models are primarily used as digital marketing assets by tourism industry businesses, ranging from scuba diving operators, resorts and liveaboard vessels to tourism authorities. Reef Smart Guides has produced 3D models of natural coral reefs, historical shipwrecks and artificial reefs, including the internal structures of some shipwreck sites, in over 20 countries around the world.

The company publishes a travel guide series, focused on diving, snorkeling and surfing for eight destinations, including Barbados, Bonaire, Curaçao, Grand Cayman and various regions within the state of Florida, including Palm Beach, the Florida Panhandle, the Florida Keys and Fort Lauderdale. The series was distributed by Mango Publishing from 2018 to 2025, and was transferred to Turner Publishing in 2025.

Reef Smart Guides' maps also appear in physical formats, including handheld waterproof cards and large format prints, often installed in public locations along the shorelines access points of dive and snorkel sites with the aim of raising awareness and improving safety. Shoreline signage has been installed in locations in Broward County, Okaloosa County, and Palm Beach County, Florida. In 2022, the Palm Beach County Department of Environmental Resources Management installed a map of the Phil Foster Park dive and snorkel trail at Blue Heron Bridge described by the Professional Association of Diving Instructors (PADI) as the number one shore dive in the United States.

In September 2025, Reef Smart Guides conducted an underwater 3D mapping training project with scuba divers from several dive centers in the greater Miami area, under a partnership with the local nonprofit organization Miami-Dade Reef Guard Association. The aim of the project was to provide training that would enable local scuba divers to collect the data necessary to continue expanding the region’s underwater maps for the benefit of the greater community. Currently, nine dive sites have been mapped as part of this project and training has been provided to seven local scuba divers.

== Other activities ==
=== Insight into hurricane forces ===
While 3D modeling artificial reefs in the Fort Lauderdale area of Florida in 2017, a dive team from Reef Smart Guides was inadvertently involved in a natural experiment that provided insight into the stability of artificial reefs underwater during passage of a hurricane. 3D modeling data was collected on several of shipwrecks in the weeks leading up to the passage of Hurricane Irma, which was the most intense storm to hit the continental United States in over a decade when it passed through the area on September 10, 2017.

The waves and currents generated by Hurricane Irma caused changes in the physical structure of several wrecks in the Fort Lauderdale area, and even physically moved the former United States Army tugboat Okinawa over 200 feet (61 m) across the seabed. Okinawa had been sunk as an artificial reef on August 19, 2017, less than one month before the storm’s passage through Florida. This event was documented in season two of The Weather Files, in an episode titled "Total Impact", which aired on the Canadian Network Cottage Life on January 25, 2021.

=== Shipwreck corrosion ===
Reef Smart Guides' 3D models have been used to illustrate how shipwrecks corrode in the ocean and to highlight the measures being used to protect them.

=== Munitions testing vessel ===
In April 2022, the United States' Air Force Research Laboratory and Eglin's Integrated Test Team, demonstrated a modified GBU-31 joint direct attack munition in the Gulf of Mexico by targeting, and successfully destroying the old cargo ship Courageous. The wreck, which was split in half by the munition, settled on the seabed at a depth of 130 feet (40 m). The site was then 3D modelled jointly by Reef Smart Guides and the Okaloosa County Artificial Reef program, providing insight into the effects of the munition.
