= Belnem =

Private community in Bonaire, Netherlands

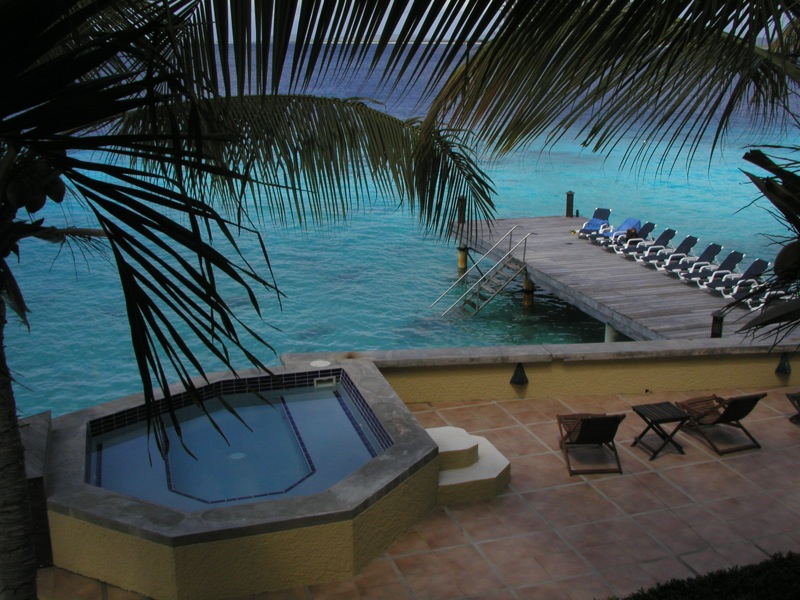

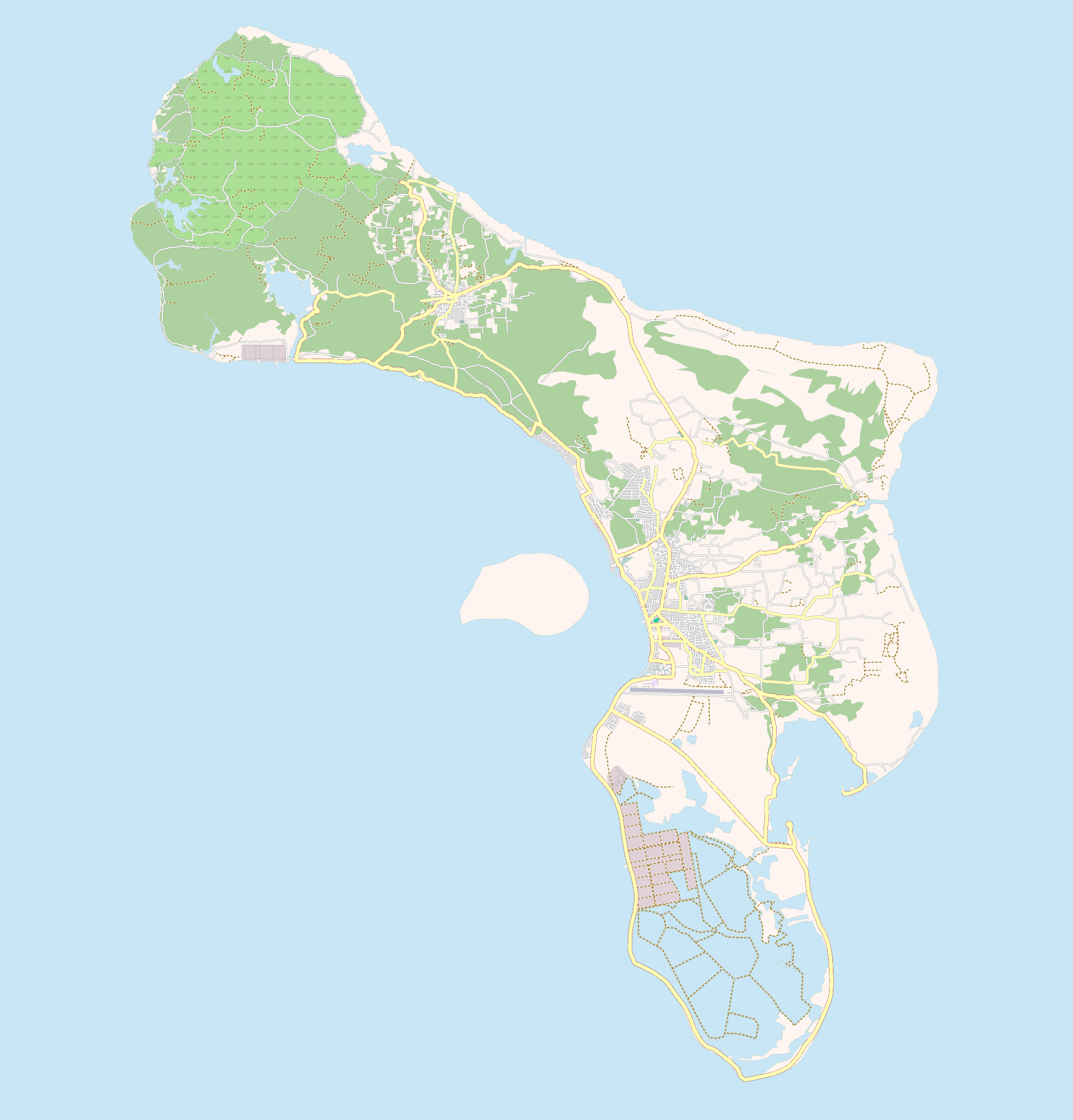
- Location in Bonaire
- Coordinates: 12°07′29″N 68°17′18″W
- Country: Netherlands
- Public body: Bonaire
- Established: 1966

Population (2020)
  - Total: 881

Belnem is a private community on the Dutch Caribbean island of Bonaire. It was named after American singer Harry Belafonte and Aruban businessman Maurice Neme. The area was developed as a luxurious private community starting in 1966, with Belafonte and Neme serving as the first directors of the Bel-Nem Caribbean Development Corporation. The community initially consisted of at least 30 houses and a connecting road, and it has since expanded with more residential neighbourhoods being added.

Belnem drew criticism from Bonaire's island council in 1981 due to the resales of land at high prices despite its original discounted sale. Belnem is also known for its proximity to Bachelor's Beach, a popular seaside spot near Flamingo International Airport.

As of 2020, the population of Belnem was 881.

== History ==
American singer Harry Belafonte often visited Bonaire and expressed his fondness of the Caribbean island. Belafonte therefore decided to embark on a joint venture with businessman Maurice Neme of Oranjestad, Aruba, to create a luxurious private community on Bonaire.

The construction of the neighbourhood began on 3 June 1966, and it was named Belnem, a portmanteau of Belafonte and Neme. At least 30 houses with a minimum size of 100 square metres and a road connecting the neighbourhood to the road network of Bonaire had to be constructed within a two-year time period.

The neighbourhood is managed by the Bel-Nem Caribbean Development Corporation. Belafonte and Neme served as its first directors. Later, other residential neighbourhoods were built in Belnem. In 1981, Belnem came under the scrutiny of Bonaire's island council because the land that had been sold to Belnem at a reduced price was being resold at high prices.

== Bachelor's Beach ==
Bachelor's Beach is a small beach near Belnem. It can be accessed via stairs down the 10 feet (3.0 m) cliff. It is one of the most popular beaches in Bonaire and is located near Flamingo International Airport, with planes passing over the beach.

== Demographics ==
Belnem had a population of 881 in 2020.
