= Mango Publishing =

American independent book publisher

- Founded: 2014
- Founder: Christopher McKenney
- Defunct: 2025
- Headquarters location: Miami, Florida
- Distribution: Ingram Publisher Services; Raincoast Books; Booktopia
- Official website: no longer online

Mango Publishing was an American book publisher founded in 2014. It shut down in late 2025.

== Company history ==
Mango Publishing was founded by Christopher McKenney in 2014 as an independent book publisher in Miami, Florida. In both 2019 and 2020, Mango was named the fastest growing independent publisher in the United States by Publishers Weekly. The company has a revenue sharing model with its authors, where it provides up to 50% of net sales to its writers.

There is a second-hand report that the publisher was shut down by its primary creditor, Lake Michigan Credit Union. While public documents do show that the credit union did file against the publisher., there is no public mention of the outcome.

== Books and imprints ==
The company publishes books in a variety of genres including non-fiction, young adult, children, self-help, business, science, pop-culture, social justice, LGBTQ, feminism, fiction and poetry. It publishes more than one hundred titles per year. It also partners with companies like Franklin Covey to create add-on books products like themed playing card decks. In 2019 the company acquired Conari Press from Red Wheel/Weiser and in 2020 they acquired Yellow Pear Press. Their additional imprints include Books and Books Press, FIU Business Press, D.O.P.E (Dreams on Paper Entertainment), the Tiny Press, and Reef Smart Guides from 2018 to 2025.
