= List of birds of Aruba =

The following is a list of birds of Aruba. The avifauna of Aruba has 245 confirmed species, of which six have been introduced by humans and 111 are rare or vagrants (including three species introduced elsewhere in the region). Two have been extirpated. None are endemic. Two additional species are unconfirmed (see below).

Except as an entry is cited otherwise, the list of species is that of the South American Classification Committee (SACC) of the American Ornithological Society. The list's taxonomic treatment (designation and sequence of orders, families, and species) and nomenclature (common and scientific names) are also those of the SACC.

The following tags have been used to highlight certain categories of occurrence.

- (V) Vagrant - a species that rarely or accidentally occurs in Aruba
- (I) Introduced - a species introduced to Aruba as a consequence, direct or indirect, of human actions
- (U) Unconfirmed - a species recorded but with "no tangible evidence" according to the SACC

== Ducks ==
Order: Anseriformes Family: Anatidae

Anatidae includes the ducks and most duck-like waterfowl, such as geese and swans. These birds are adapted to an aquatic existence with webbed feet, flattened bills, and feathers that are excellent at shedding water due to an oily coating.

- Fulvous whistling-duck, Dendrocygna bicolor (V)
- White-faced whistling-duck, Dendrocygna viduata (V)
- Black-bellied whistling-duck, Dendrocygna autumnalis
- Muscovy duck, Cairina moschata (I)
- Comb duck, Sarkidiornis silvicola (V)
- Northern shoveler, Spatula clypeata
- Blue-winged teal, Spatula discors
- Cinnamon teal, Spatula cyanoptera (V)
- American wigeon, Mareca americana
- White-cheeked pintail, Anas bahamensis
- Northern pintail, Anas acuta (V)
- Green-winged teal, Anas crecca (V)
- Ring-necked duck, Aythya collaris (V)
- Lesser scaup, Aythya affinis
- Masked duck, Nomonyx dominicus (V)

== New World quails ==
Order: Galliformes Family: Odontophoridae

The New World quails are small, plump terrestrial birds only distantly related to the quails of the Old World, but named for their similar appearance and habits.

- Crested bobwhite, Colinus cristatus

== Flamingos ==
Order: Phoenicopteriformes Family: Phoenicopteridae

Flamingos are gregarious wading birds, usually 3 to 5 feet (0.9 to 1.5 m) tall, found in both the Western and Eastern Hemispheres. Flamingos filter-feed on shellfish and algae. Their oddly shaped beaks are specially adapted to separate mud and silt from the food they consume and, uniquely, are used upside-down.

- American flamingo, Phoenicopterus ruber

== Grebes ==
Order: Podicipediformes Family: Podicipedidae

Grebes are small to medium-large freshwater diving birds. They have lobed toes and are excellent swimmers and divers. However, they have their feet placed far back on the body, making them quite ungainly on land..

- Least grebe, Tachybaptus dominicus
- Pied-billed grebe, Podilymbus podiceps

== Pigeons ==
Order: Columbiformes Family: Columbidae

Pigeons and doves are stout-bodied birds with short necks and short slender bills with a fleshy cere.

- Rock pigeon, Columba livia (I)
- Scaly-naped pigeon, Patagioenas squamosa (extirpated)
- Bare-eyed pigeon, Patagioenas corensis
- White-tipped dove, Leptotila verreauxi
- Eared dove, Zenaida auriculata
- Common ground dove, Columbina passerina

== Cuckoos ==
Order: Cuculiformes Family: Cuculidae

The family Cuculidae includes cuckoos, roadrunners, and anis. These birds are of variable size with slender bodies, long tails, and strong legs.

- Greater ani, Crotophaga major (V)
- Smooth-billed ani, Crotophaga ani (V)
- Groove-billed ani, Crotophaga sulcirostris
- Yellow-billed cuckoo, Coccyzus americanus
- Mangrove cuckoo, Coccyzus minor (V)

== Oilbird ==
Order: Steatornithiformes Family: Steatornithidae

The oilbird is a slim, long-winged bird related to the nightjars. It is nocturnal and a specialist feeder on the fruit of the oil palm.

- Oilbird, Steatornis caripensis (V)

== Nightjars ==
Order: Caprimulgiformes Family: Caprimulgidae

Nightjars are medium-sized nocturnal birds that usually nest on the ground. They have long wings, short legs, and very short bills. Most have small feet, of little use for walking, and long pointed wings. Their soft plumage is camouflaged to resemble bark or leaves.

- Common nighthawk, Chordeiles minor
- Antillean nighthawk, Chordeiles gundlachii (V)
- Little nightjar, Setopagis parvula (V)
- White-tailed nightjar, Hydropsalis cayennensis
- Chuck-will's-widow, Antrostomus carolinensis (V)

== Swifts ==
Order: Apodiformes Family: Apodidae

Swifts are small birds which spend the majority of their lives flying. These birds have very short legs and never settle voluntarily on the ground, perching instead only on vertical surfaces. Many swifts have long swept-back wings which resemble a crescent or boomerang.

- White-collared swift, Streptoprocne zonaris (V)
- Vaux's swift, Chaetura vauxi (V)
- Chimney swift, Chaetura pelagica

== Hummingbirds ==
Order: Apodiformes Family: Trochilidae

Hummingbirds are small birds capable of hovering in mid-air due to the rapid flapping of their wings. They are the only birds that can fly backwards.

- White-necked jacobin, Florisuga mellivora (V)
- Ruby-topaz hummingbird, Chrysolampis mosquitus
- Blue-tailed emerald, Chlorostilbon mellisugus

== Limpkin ==
Order: Gruiformes Family: Aramidae

The limpkin resembles a large rail. It has drab-brown plumage and a grayer head and neck.

- Limpkin, Aramus guarauna (V)

== Rails ==
Order: Gruiformes Family: Rallidae

Rallidae is a large family of small to medium-sized birds which includes the rails, crakes, coots, and gallinules. Typically they inhabit dense vegetation in damp environments near lakes, swamps, or rivers. In general they are shy and secretive birds, making them difficult to observe. Most species have strong legs and long toes which are well adapted to soft uneven surfaces. They tend to have short, rounded wings and are weak fliers.

- Purple gallinule, Porphyrio martinica
- Sora, Porzana carolina
- Common gallinule, Gallinula galeata
- American coot, Fulica americana

== Plovers ==
Order: Charadriiformes Family: Charadriidae

The family Charadriidae includes the plovers, dotterels, and lapwings. They are small to medium-sized birds with compact bodies, short thick necks, and long, usually pointed, wings. They are found in open country worldwide, mostly in habitats near water.

- Black-bellied plover, Pluvialis squatarola
- American golden-plover, Pluvialis dominica
- Killdeer, Charadrius vociferus
- Semipalmated plover, Charadrius semipalmatus
- Southern lapwing, Vanellus chilensis
- Wilson's plover, Anarynchus wilsonia
- Collared plover, Anarynchus collaris
- Snowy plover, Anarynchus nivosus (V)

== Oystercatchers ==
Order: Charadriiformes Family: Haematopodidae

The oystercatchers are large and noisy plover-like birds, with strong bills used for smashing or prising open molluscs.

- American oystercatcher, Haematopus palliatus

== Avocets and stilts ==
Order: Charadriiformes Family: Recurvirostridae

Recurvirostridae is a family of large wading birds which includes the avocets and stilts. The avocets have long legs and long up-curved bills. The stilts have extremely long legs and long, thin, straight bills.

- Black-necked stilt, Himantopus mexicanus

== Sandpipers ==
Order: Charadriiformes Family: Scolopacidae

Scolopacidae is a large diverse family of small to medium-sized shorebirds including the sandpipers, curlews, godwits, shanks, tattlers, woodcocks, snipes, dowitchers and phalaropes. The majority of these species eat small invertebrates picked out of the, mud or soil. Variation in length of legs and bills enables multiple species to feed in the same habitat, particularly on the coast, without direct competition for food.

- Upland sandpiper, Bartramia longicauda (V)
- Whimbrel, Numenius phaeopus
- Hudsonian godwit, Limosa haemastica (V)
- Ruddy turnstone, Arenaria interpres
- Red knot, Calidris canutus (V)
- Ruff, Calidris pugnax (V)
- Stilt sandpiper, Calidris himantopus
- Curlew sandpiper, Calidris ferruginea (V)
- Sanderling, Calidris alba
- Baird's sandpiper, Calidris bairdii (V)
- Least sandpiper, Calidris minutilla
- White-rumped sandpiper, Calidris fuscicollis
- Buff-breasted sandpiper, Calidris subruficollis
- Pectoral sandpiper, Calidris melanotos
- Semipalmated sandpiper, Calidris pusilla
- Western sandpiper, Calidris mauri
- Short-billed dowitcher, Limnodromus griseus
- Long-billed dowitcher, Limnodromus scolopaceus (V)
- Wilson's snipe, Gallinago delicata
- Spotted sandpiper, Actitis macularius
- Solitary sandpiper, Tringa solitaria
- Greater yellowlegs, Tringa melanoleuca
- Willet, Tringa semipalmata
- Lesser yellowlegs, Tringa flavipes

== Jacanas ==
Order: Charadriiformes Family: Jacanidae

The jacanas are a group of waders found throughout the tropics. They are identifiable by their huge feet and claws which enable them to walk on floating vegetation in the shallow lakes that are their preferred habitat.

- Wattled jacana, Jacana jacana (V)

== Skuas ==
Order: Charadriiformes Family: Stercorariidae

The family Stercorariidae are, in general, medium to large birds, typically with gray or brown plumage, often with white markings on the wings. They nest on the ground in temperate and arctic regions and are long-distance migrants.

- South polar skua, Stercorarius maccormicki (V)
- Pomarine jaeger, Stercorarius pomarinus (V)
- Parasitic jaeger, Stercorarius parasiticus (V)
- Long-tailed jaeger, Stercorarius longicaudus (V)

== Gulls ==
Order: Charadriiformes Family: Laridae

Laridae is a family of medium to large seabirds and includes gulls, kittiwakes, and terns. They are typically gray or white, often with black markings on the head or wings. They have stout, longish bills and webbed feet. Terns are a group of generally medium to large seabirds typically with gray or white plumage, often with black markings on the head. Most terns hunt fish by diving but some pick insects off the surface of fresh water. Terns are generally long-lived birds, with several species known to live in excess of 30 years.

- Brown noddy, Anous stolidus
- Black noddy, Anous minutus
- Black skimmer, Rynchops niger
- Laughing gull, Leucophaeus atricilla
- Franklin's gull, Leucophaeus pipixcan (V)
- Ring-billed gull, Larus delawarensis (V)
- Great black-backed gull, Larus marinus (V)
- Lesser black-backed gull, Larus fuscus (V)
- Herring gull, Larus argentatus (V)
- Sooty tern, Onychoprion fuscatus
- Bridled tern, Onychoprion anaethetus
- Least tern, Sternula antillarum
- Large-billed tern, Phaetusa simplex (V)
- Gull-billed tern, Gelochelidon nilotica
- Caspian tern, Hydroprogne caspia (V)
- Black tern, Chlidonias niger
- Common tern, Sterna hirundo
- Roseate tern, Sterna dougallii
- Forster's tern, Sterna forsteri (V)
- Sandwich tern, Thalasseus sandvicensis
- Royal tern, Thalasseus maximus

== Tropicbirds ==
Order: Phaethontiformes Family: Phaethontidae

Tropicbirds are slender white birds of tropical oceans with exceptionally long central tail feathers. Their heads and long wings have black markings.

- Red-billed tropicbird, Phaethon aethereus (V)

== Southern storm-petrels ==
Order: Procellariiformes Family: Oceanitidae

The storm-petrels are relatives of the petrels and are the smallest seabirds. They feed on planktonic crustaceans and small fish picked from the surface, typically while hovering. The flight is fluttering and sometimes bat-like.

- Wilson's storm-petrel, Oceanites oceanicus (V)

== Shearwaters ==
Order: Procellariiformes Family: Procellariidae

The procellariids are the main group of medium-sized "true petrels", characterized by united nostrils with medium septum and a long outer functional primary.

- Black-capped petrel, Pterodroma hasitata (V)
- Bulwer's petrel, Bulweria bulwerii (V)
- Cory's shearwater, Calonectris diomedea (V)
- Audubon's shearwater, Puffinus lherminieri (V)

== Storks ==
Order: Ciconiiformes Family: Ciconiidae

Storks are large, long-legged, long-necked, wading birds with long, stout bills. Storks are mute, but bill-clattering is an important mode of communication at the nest. Their nests can be large and may be reused for many years. Many species are migratory.

- Wood stork, Mycteria americana (V)

== Frigatebirds ==
Order: Suliformes Family: Fregatidae

Frigatebirds are large seabirds usually found over tropical oceans. They are large, black-and-white, or completely black, with long wings and deeply forked tails. The males have colored inflatable throat pouches. They do not swim or walk and cannot take off from a flat surface. Having the largest wingspan-to-body-weight ratio of any bird, they are essentially aerial, able to stay aloft for more than a week.

- Magnificent frigatebird, Fregata magnificens
- Great frigatebird, Fregata minor (V)

== Boobies ==
Order: Suliformes Family: Sulidae

The sulids comprise the gannets and boobies. Both groups are medium to large coastal seabirds that plunge-dive for fish.

- Masked booby, Sula dactylatra
- Red-footed booby, Sula sula
- Brown booby, Sula leucogaster

== Cormorants ==
Order: Suliformes Family: Phalacrocoracidae

Phalacrocoracidae is a family of medium to large coastal, fish-eating seabirds that includes cormorants and shags. Plumage coloration varies, with the majority having mainly dark plumage, some species being black-and-white, and a few being colorful.

- Neotropic cormorant, Phalacrocorax brasilianus

== Pelicans ==
Order: Pelecaniformes Family: Pelecanidae

Pelicans are large water birds with a distinctive pouch under their beak. As with other members of the order Pelecaniformes, they have webbed feet with four toes.

- Brown pelican, Pelecanus occidentalis

== Herons ==
Order: Pelecaniformes Family: Ardeidae

The family Ardeidae contains the bitterns, herons, and egrets. Herons and egrets are medium to large wading birds with long necks and legs. Bitterns tend to be shorter necked and more wary. Members of Ardeidae fly with their necks retracted, unlike other long-necked birds such as storks, ibises, and spoonbills.

- Least bittern, Ixobrychus exilis
- Pinnated bittern, Botaurus pinnatus (V)
- Whistling heron, Syrigma sibilatrix (V)
- Little blue heron, Egretta caerulea
- Tricolored heron, Egretta tricolor
- Reddish egret, Egretta rufescens
- Snowy egret, Egretta thula
- Little egret, Egretta garzetta (V)
- Yellow-crowned night-heron, Nyctanassa violacea
- Black-crowned night-heron, Nycticorax nycticorax
- Striated heron, Butorides striata (V)
- Green heron, Butorides virescens
- Cattle egret, Ardea ibis
- Great egret, Ardea alba
- Great blue heron, Ardea herodias

== Ibises ==
Order: Pelecaniformes Family: Threskiornithidae

Threskiornithidae is a family of large terrestrial and wading birds which includes the ibises and spoonbills. They have long, broad wings with 11 primary and about 20 secondary feathers. They are strong fliers and despite their size and weight, very capable soarers.

- White ibis, Eudocimus albus (V)
- Scarlet ibis, Eudocimus ruber (V)
- Glossy ibis, Plegadis falcinellus
- White-faced ibis, Plegadis chihi (V)
- Roseate spoonbill, Platalea ajaja

== New World vultures ==
Order: Cathartiformes Family: Cathartidae

The New World vultures are not closely related to Old World vultures, but superficially resemble them because of convergent evolution. Like the Old World vultures, they are scavengers. However, unlike Old World vultures, which find carcasses by sight, New World vultures have a good sense of smell with which they locate carrion.

- Black vulture, Coragyps atratus (V)
- Turkey vulture, Cathartes aura (V)

== Osprey ==
Order: Accipitriformes Family: Pandionidae

The family Pandionidae contains only one species, the osprey. The osprey is a medium-large raptor which is a specialist fish-eater with a worldwide distribution.

- Osprey, Pandion haliaetus

== Hawks ==
Order: Accipitriformes Family: Accipitridae

Accipitridae is a family of birds of prey, which includes hawks, eagles, kites, harriers, and Old World vultures. These birds have powerful hooked beaks for tearing flesh from their prey, strong legs, powerful talons, and keen eyesight.

- White-tailed kite, Elanus leucurus (V)
- Swallow-tailed kite, Elanoides forficatus (V)
- Snail kite, Rostrhamus sociabilis (V)
- Northern harrier, Circus hudsonius (V)
- White-tailed hawk, Geranoaetus albicaudatus (V)

== Owls ==
Order: Strigiformes Family: Strigidae

The typical owls are small to large solitary nocturnal birds of prey. They have large forward-facing eyes and ears, a hawk-like beak and a conspicuous circle of feathers around each eye called a facial disk.

- Burrowing owl, Athene cunicularia

== Kingfishers ==
Order: Coraciiformes Family: Alcedinidae

Kingfishers are medium-sized birds with large heads, long pointed bills, short legs, and stubby tails.

- Ringed kingfisher, Megaceryle torquata (V)
- Belted kingfisher, Megaceryle alcyon
- Amazon kingfisher, Chloroceryle amazona (V)

== Woodpeckers ==
Order: Piciformes Family: Picidae

Woodpeckers are small to medium-sized birds with chisel-like beaks, short legs, stiff tails, and long tongues used for capturing insects. Some species have feet with two toes pointing forward and two backward, while several species have only three toes. Many woodpeckers have the habit of tapping noisily on tree trunks with their beaks.

- Yellow-bellied sapsucker, Sphyrapicus varius (V)

== Falcons ==
Order: Falconiformes Family: Falconidae

Falconidae is a family of diurnal birds of prey. They differ from hawks, eagles, and kites in that they kill with their beaks instead of their talons.

- Crested caracara, Caracara plancus
- Yellow-headed caracara, Milvago chimachima
- American kestrel, Falco sparverius
- Merlin, Falco columbarius
- Aplomado falcon, Falco femoralis (V)
- Peregrine falcon, Falco peregrinus

== Old World parrots ==
Order: Psittaciformes Family: Psittaculidae

Characteristic features of parrots include a strong curved bill, an upright stance, strong legs, and clawed zygodactyl feet. Many parrots are vividly colored, and some are multi-colored. In size they range from 8 cm (3.1 in) to 1 m (3.3 ft) in length. Old World parrots are found from Africa east across south and southeast Asia and Oceania to Australia and New Zealand.

- Rose-ringed parakeet, Psittacula krameri (I)

== New World and African parrots ==
Order: Psittaciformes Family: Psittacidae.

Parrots are small to large birds with a characteristic curved beak. Their upper mandibles have slight mobility in the joint with the skull and they have a generally erect stance. All parrots are zygodactyl, having the four toes on each foot placed two at the front and two to the back.

- Yellow-shouldered amazon, Amazona barbadensis (extirpated)
- Brown-throated parakeet, Eupsittula pertinax

== Tyrant flycatchers ==
Order: Passeriformes Family: Tyrannidae

Tyrant flycatchers are passerine birds which occur throughout North and South America. They superficially resemble the Old World flycatchers, but are more robust and have stronger bills. They do not have the sophisticated vocal capabilities of the songbirds. Most, but not all, have plain coloring. As the name implies, most are insectivorous.

- Caribbean elaenia, Elaenia martinica
- Small-billed elaenia, Elaenia parvirostris (V)
- Mouse-colored tyrannulet, Phaeomyias murina (V)
- Cattle tyrant, Machetornis rixosa
- Tropical kingbird, Tyrannus melancholicus
- Fork-tailed flycatcher, Tyrannus savana
- Eastern Kingbird, Tyrannus tyrannus (V)
- Gray kingbird, Tyrannus dominicensis
- Swainson's flycatcher, Myiarchus swainsoni (V)
- Brown-crested flycatcher, Myiarchus tyrannulus
- Northern scrub-flycatcher, Sublegatus arenarum
- Vermilion flycatcher, Pyrocephalus rubinus (V)
- Willow flycatcher, Empidonax traillii (V)
- Eastern wood-pewee, Contopus virens (V)

== Vireos ==
Order: Passeriformes Family: Vireonidae

The vireos are a group of small to medium-sized passerine birds. They are typically greenish in color and resemble New World warblers apart from their heavier bills.

- Yellow-throated vireo, Vireo flavifrons (U)
- Philadelphia vireo, Vireo philadelphicus (V)
- Red-eyed vireo, Vireo olivaceus
- Yellow-green vireo, Vireo flavoviridis (V)
- Black-whiskered vireo, Vireo altiloquus

== Swallows ==
Order: Passeriformes Family: Hirundinidae

The family Hirundinidae is adapted to aerial feeding. They have a slender streamlined body, long pointed wings, and a short bill with a wide gape. The feet are adapted to perching rather than walking, and the front toes are partially joined at the base.

- Southern rough-winged swallow, Stelgidopteryx ruficollis (V)
- Brown-chested martin, Progne tapera (V)
- Purple martin, Progne subis (V)
- Caribbean martin, Progne dominicensis (V)
- Cuban martin, Progne cryptoleuca (U)
- Bank swallow, Riparia riparia
- Barn swallow, Hirundo rustica
- Cliff swallow, Petrochelidon pyrrhonota
- Cave swallow, Petrochelidon fulva (V)

== Waxwings ==
Order: Passeriformes Family: Bombycillidae

The waxwings are a group of birds with soft silky plumage and unique red tips to some of the wing feathers. In the Bohemian and cedar waxwings, these tips look like sealing wax and give the group its name. These are arboreal birds of northern forests. They live on insects in summer and berries in winter.

- Cedar waxwing, Bombycilla cedrorum (V)

== Thrushes ==
Order: Passeriformes Family: Turdidae

The thrushes are a group of passerine birds that occur mainly in the Old World. They are plump, soft plumaged, small to medium-sized insectivores or sometimes omnivores, often feeding on the ground. Many have attractive songs.

- Veery, Catharus fuscescens (V)
- Wood thrush, Hylocichla mustelina (V)

== Mockingbirds ==
Order: Passeriformes Family: Mimidae

The mimids are a family of passerine birds that includes thrashers, mockingbirds, tremblers, and the New World catbirds. These birds are notable for their vocalizations, especially their ability to mimic a wide variety of birds and other sounds heard outdoors. Their coloring tends towards dull-grays and browns.

- Gray catbird, Dumetella carolinensis (V)
- Tropical mockingbird, Mimus gilvus

== Starlings ==
Order: Passeriformes Family: Sturnidae

Starlings are small to medium-sized passerine birds. Their flight is strong and direct and they are very gregarious. Their preferred habitat is fairly open country. They eat insects and fruit. Plumage is typically dark with a metallic sheen.

- European starling, Sturnus vulgaris (introduced to the Western Hemisphere) (V)

== Weavers ==
Order: Passeriformes Family: Ploceidae

The weavers are small passerine birds related to the finches. They are seed-eating birds with rounded conical bills. The males of many species are brightly colored, usually in red or yellow and black, some species show variation in color only in the breeding season.

- Village weaver, Ploceus cucullatus (introduced to the Western Hemisphere) (V)

== Estrildids ==
Order: Passeriformes Family: Estrildidae

The members of this family are small passerine birds native to the Old World tropics. They are gregarious and often colonial seed eaters with short thick but pointed bills. They are all similar in structure and habits, but have wide variation in plumage colors and patterns.

- Tricolored munia, Lonchura malacca (introduced to the Western Hemisphere) (V)

== Old World sparrows ==
Order: Passeriformes Family: Passeridae

Old World sparrows are small passerine birds. In general, sparrows tend to be small, plump, brown or gray birds with short tails and short powerful beaks. Sparrows are seed eaters, but they also consume small insects.

- House sparrow, Passer domesticus (I)

== Sparrows ==
Order: Passeriformes Family: Passerellidae

Most of the species are known as sparrows, but these birds are not closely related to the Old World sparrows which are in the family Passeridae. Many of these have distinctive head patterns.

- Rufous-collared sparrow, Zonotrichia capensis

== Blackbirds ==
Order: Passeriformes Family: Icteridae

The icterids are a group of small to medium-sized, often colorful, passerine birds restricted to the New World and include the grackles, New World blackbirds, and New World orioles. Most species have black as the predominant plumage color, often enlivened by yellow, orange, or red.

- Bobolink, Dolichonyx oryzivorus
- Red-breasted meadowlark, Leistes militaris (V)
- Venezuelan troupial, Icterus icterus
- Baltimore oriole, Icterus galbula (V)
- Yellow oriole, Icterus nigrogularis
- Shiny cowbird, Molothrus bonariensis
- Carib grackle, Quiscalus lugubris (I)
- Great-tailed grackle, Quiscalus mexicanus (V)
- Oriole blackbird, Gymnomystax mexicanus (V)
- Yellow-hooded blackbird, Chrysomus icterocephalus (V)

== Wood-warblers ==
Order: Passeriformes Family: Parulidae

The wood-warblers are a group of small, often colorful, passerine birds restricted to the New World. Most are arboreal, but some are terrestrial. Most members of this family are insectivores.

- Ovenbird, Seiurus aurocapilla
- Northern waterthrush, Parkesia noveboracensis
- Louisiana waterthrush, Parkesia motacilla (V)
- Golden-winged warbler, Vermivora chrysoptera (V)
- Blue-winged warbler, Vermivora cyanoptera (V)
- Black-and-white warbler, Mniotilta varia
- Prothonotary warbler, Protonotaria citrea
- Tennessee warbler, Oreothlypis peregrina (V)
- Connecticut warbler, Oporornis agilis (V)
- Kentucky warbler, Geothlypis formosa (V)
- Common yellowthroat, Geothlypis trichas
- Hooded warbler, Setophaga citrina
- American redstart, Setophaga ruticilla
- Cape May warbler, Setophaga tigrina
- Northern parula, Setophaga americana
- Magnolia warbler, Setophaga magnolia (V)
- Bay-breasted warbler, Setophaga castanea (V)
- Blackburnian warbler, Setophaga fusca
- Yellow warbler, Setophaga petechia
- Chestnut-sided warbler, Setophaga pensylvanica
- Blackpoll warbler, Setophaga striata
- Black-throated blue warbler, Setophaga caerulescens (V)
- Palm warbler, Setophaga palmarum (V)
- Yellow-rumped warbler, Setophaga coronata (V)
- Prairie warbler, Setophaga discolor (V)
- Black-throated green warbler, Setophaga virens (V)
- Canada warbler, Cardellina canadensis (V)

== Cardinal grosbeaks ==
Order: Passeriformes Family: Cardinalidae

The cardinals are a family of robust, seed-eating birds with strong bills. They are typically associated with open woodland. The sexes usually have distinct plumages.

- Summer tanager, Piranga rubra (V)
- Scarlet tanager, Piranga olivacea (V)
- Rose-breasted grosbeak, Pheucticus ludovicianus (V)
- Blue grosbeak, Passerina caerulea (V)
- Indigo bunting, Passerina cyanea
- Dickcissel, Spiza americana (V)

== Tanagers ==
Order: Passeriformes Family: Thraupidae

The tanagers are a large group of small to medium-sized passerine birds restricted to the New World, mainly in the tropics. Many species are brightly colored. They are seed eaters, but their preference tends towards fruit and nectar. Most have short, rounded wings.

- Saffron finch, Sicalis flaveola (I)
- Bananaquit, Coereba flaveola
- Black-faced grassquit, Melanospiza bicolor

== See also ==
- List of birds
- Lists of birds by region

== Other reading ==
- de Boer, Bart; Newton, Eric; Restall, Robin (2012). Birds of Aruba, Curaçao and Bonaire. Christopher Helm. ISBN 9781408137277.
