= List of birds of Curaçao =

This is a list of the bird species recorded in Curaçao. The avifauna of Curaçao has 217 confirmed species, of which 13 have been introduced by humans and 75 are rare or vagrants. An additional four species are unconfirmed (see below). None are endemic.

Except as an entry is cited otherwise, the list of species is that of the South American Classification Committee (SACC). The list's taxonomic treatment (designation and sequence of orders, families, and species) and nomenclature (common and scientific names) are also those of the SACC.

The following tags have been used to highlight certain categories of occurrence.

- (V) Vagrant - a species that rarely or accidentally occurs in Curaçao
- (I) Introduced - a species introduced to Curaçao as a consequence, direct or indirect, of human actions
- (U) Unconfirmed - a species recorded but with "no tangible evidence" according to the SACC

== Ducks ==
Order: Anseriformes Family: Anatidae

Anatidae includes the ducks and most duck-like waterfowl, such as geese and swans. These birds are adapted to an aquatic existence with webbed feet, flattened bills, and feathers that are excellent at shedding water due to an oily coating.

- White-faced whistling-duck, Dendrocygna viduata (V)
- Black-bellied whistling-duck, Dendrocygna autumnalis
- Comb duck, Sarkidiornis sylvicola (V)
- Northern shoveler, Spatula clypeata
- Blue-winged teal, Spatula discors
- American wigeon, Mareca americana
- White-cheeked pintail, Anas bahamensis
- Green-winged teal, Anas crecca
- Ring-necked duck, Aythya collaris (V)
- Lesser scaup, Aythya affinis
- Masked duck, Nomonyx dominicus (V)

== New World quails ==
Order: Galliformes Family: Odontophoridae

The New World quails are small, plump terrestrial birds only distantly related to the quails of the Old World, but named for their similar appearance and habits.

- Crested bobwhite, Colinus cristatus

== Flamingos ==
Order: Phoenicopteriformes Family: Phoenicopteridae

Flamingos are gregarious wading birds, usually 3 to 5 feet (0.9 to 1.5 m) tall, found in both the Western and Eastern Hemispheres. Flamingos filter-feed on shellfish and algae. Their oddly shaped beaks are specially adapted to separate mud and silt from the food they consume and, uniquely, are used upside-down.

- American flamingo, Phoenicopterus ruber

== Grebes ==
Order: Podicipediformes Family: Podicipedidae

Grebes are small to medium-large freshwater diving birds. They have lobed toes and are excellent swimmers and divers. However, they have their feet placed far back on the body, making them quite ungainly on land.

- Least grebe, Tachybaptus dominicus
- Pied-billed grebe, Podilymbus podiceps

== Pigeons ==
Order: Columbiformes Family: Columbidae

Pigeons and doves are stout-bodied birds with short necks and short slender bills with a fleshy cere.

- Rock pigeon, Columba livia (I)
- Scaly-naped pigeon, Patagioenas squamosa
- Bare-eyed pigeon, Patagioenas corensis
- White-tipped dove, Leptotila verreauxi
- Eared dove, Zenaida auriculata
- Common ground dove, Columbina passerina

== Cuckoos ==
Order: Cuculiformes Family: Cuculidae

The family Cuculidae includes cuckoos, roadrunners, and anis. These birds are of variable size with slender bodies, long tails, and strong legs.

- Guira cuckoo, Guira guira (V)
- Greater ani, Crotophaga major (U)
- Groove-billed ani, Crotophaga sulcirostris
- Yellow-billed cuckoo, Coccyzus americanus
- Mangrove cuckoo, Coccyzus minor

== Nightjars ==
Order: Caprimulgiformes Family: Caprimulgidae

Nightjars are medium-sized nocturnal birds that usually nest on the ground. They have long wings, short legs, and very short bills. Most have small feet, of little use for walking, and long pointed wings. Their soft plumage is camouflaged to resemble bark or leaves.

- Lesser nighthawk, Chordeiles acutipennis (V)
- Common nighthawk, Chordeiles minor
- Antillean nighthawk, Chordeiles gundlachii (V)
- White-tailed nightjar, Hydropsalis cayennensis
- Chuck-will's-widow, Antrostomus carolinensis (V)

== Swifts ==
Order: Apodiformes Family: Apodidae

Swifts are small birds which spend the majority of their lives flying. These birds have very short legs and never settle voluntarily on the ground, perching instead only on vertical surfaces. Many swifts have long swept-back wings which resemble a crescent or boomerang.

- Black swift, Cypseloides niger (V)
- Chimney swift, Chaetura pelagica (V)

== Hummingbirds ==
Order: Apodiformes Family: Trochilidae

Hummingbirds are small birds capable of hovering in mid-air due to the rapid flapping of their wings. They are the only birds that can fly backwards.

- White-necked jacobin, Florisuga mellivora (V)
- Rufous-breasted hermit, Glaucis hirsutus (V)
- Ruby-topaz hummingbird, Chrysolampis mosquitus
- Blue-tailed emerald, Chlorostilbon mellisugus

== Rails ==
Order: Gruiformes Family: Rallidae

Rallidae is a large family of small to medium-sized birds which includes the rails, crakes, coots, and gallinules. Typically they inhabit dense vegetation in damp environments near lakes, swamps, or rivers. In general they are shy and secretive birds, making them difficult to observe. Most species have strong legs and long toes which are well adapted to soft uneven surfaces. They tend to have short, rounded wings and are weak fliers.

- Purple gallinule, Porphyrio martinica
- Sora, Porzana carolina
- Common gallinule, Gallinula galeata
- American coot, Fulica americana

== Plovers ==
Order: Charadriiformes Family: Charadriidae

The family Charadriidae includes the plovers, dotterels and lapwings. They are small to medium-sized birds with compact bodies, short thick necks and long, usually pointed, wings. They are found in open country worldwide, mostly in habitats near water.

- Black-bellied plover, Pluvialis squatarola
- American golden-plover, Pluvialis dominica
- Killdeer, Charadrius vociferus
- Semipalmated plover, Charadrius semipalmatus
- Southern lapwing, Vanellus chilensis
- Wilson's plover, Anarynchus wilsonia
- Collared plover, Anarynchus collaris
- Snowy plover, Anarynchus nivosus

== Oystercatchers ==
Order: Charadriiformes Family: Haematopodidae

The oystercatchers are large and noisy plover-like birds, with strong bills used for smashing or prising open molluscs.

- American oystercatcher, Haematopus palliatus

== Avocets and stilts ==
Order: Charadriiformes Family: Recurvirostridae

Recurvirostridae is a family of large wading birds, which includes the avocets and stilts. The avocets have long legs and long up-curved bills. The stilts have extremely long legs and long, thin, straight bills.

- Black-necked stilt, Himantopus mexicanus

== Thick-knees ==
Order: Charadriiformes Family: Burhinidae

The thick-knees are a group of waders found worldwide within the tropical zone, with some species also breeding in temperate Europe and Australia. They are medium to large waders with strong black or yellow-black bills, large yellow eyes, and cryptic plumage. Despite being classed as waders, most species have a preference for arid or semi-arid habitats.

- Double-striped thick-knee, Hesperoburhinus bistriatus (V)

== Sandpipers ==
Order: Charadriiformes Family: Scolopacidae

Scolopacidae is a large diverse family of small to medium-sized shorebirds including the sandpipers, curlews, godwits, shanks, tattlers, woodcocks, snipes, dowitchers, and phalaropes. The majority of these species eat small invertebrates picked out of the mud or soil. Variation in length of legs and bills enables multiple species to feed in the same habitat, particularly on the coast, without direct competition for food.

- Upland sandpiper, Bartramia longicauda (V)
- Whimbrel, Numenius phaeopus
- Hudsonian godwit, Limosa haemastica (V)
- Ruddy turnstone, Arenaria interpres
- Red knot, Calidris canutus (V)
- Stilt sandpiper, Calidris himantopus
- Sanderling, Calidris alba
- Dunlin, Calidris alpina (V)
- Baird's sandpiper, Calidris bairdii (V)
- Least sandpiper, Calidris minutilla
- White-rumped sandpiper, Calidris fuscicollis
- Buff-breasted sandpiper, Calidris subruficollis (V)
- Pectoral sandpiper, Calidris melanotos
- Semipalmated sandpiper, Calidris pusilla
- Western sandpiper, Calidris mauri
- Short-billed dowitcher, Limnodromus griseus
- Long-billed dowitcher, Limnodromus scolopaceus (V)
- Wilson's snipe, Gallinago delicata
- Wilson's phalarope, Phalaropus tricolor (V)
- Red-necked phalarope, Phalaropus lobatus (V)
- Spotted sandpiper, Actitis macularius
- Solitary sandpiper, Tringa solitaria
- Greater yellowlegs, Tringa melanoleuca
- Willet, Tringa semipalmata
- Lesser yellowlegs, Tringa flavipes

== Jacanas ==
Order: Charadriiformes Family: Jacanidae

The jacanas are a group of waders found throughout the tropics. They are identifiable by their huge feet and claws which enable them to walk on floating vegetation in the shallow lakes that are their preferred habitat.

- Wattled jacana, Jacana jacana (V)

== Skuas ==
Order: Charadriiformes Family: Stercorariidae

The family Stercorariidae are, in general, medium to large birds, typically with gray or brown plumage, often with white markings on the wings. They nest on the ground in temperate and arctic regions and are long-distance migrants.

- Great skua, Stercorarius skua (V)
- Parasitic jaeger, Stercorarius parasiticus (V)

== Gulls ==
Order: Charadriiformes Family: Laridae

Laridae is a family of medium to large seabirds and includes gulls, kittiwakes, and terns. They are typically gray or white, often with black markings on the head or wings. They have stout, longish bills and webbed feet. Terns are a group of generally medium to large seabirds typically with gray or white plumage, often with black markings on the head. Most terns hunt fish by diving but some pick insects off the surface of fresh water. Terns are generally long-lived birds, with several species known to live in excess of 30 years.

- Brown noddy, Anous stolidus
- Black skimmer, Rynchops niger
- Laughing gull, Leucophaeus atricilla
- Sooty tern, Onychoprion fuscatus
- Bridled tern, Onychoprion anaethetus
- Least tern, Sternula antillarum
- Gull-billed tern, Gelochelidon nilotica
- Caspian tern, Hydroprogne caspia (V)
- Black tern, Chlidonias niger (V)
- Common tern, Sterna hirundo
- Roseate tern, Sterna dougallii
- Sandwich tern, Thalasseus sandvicensis
- Royal tern, Thalasseus maximus

== Tropicbirds ==
Order: Phaethontiformes Family: Phaethontidae

Tropicbirds are slender white birds of tropical oceans with exceptionally long central tail feathers. Their heads and long wings have black markings.

- White-tailed tropicbird, Phaethon lepturus (V)
- Red-billed tropicbird, Phaethon aethereus

== Southern storm-petrels ==
Order: Procellariiformes Family: Oceanitidae

The storm-petrels are the smallest seabirds, relatives of the petrels, feeding on planktonic crustaceans and small fish picked from the surface, typically while hovering. The flight is fluttering and sometimes bat-like. Until 2018, this family's species were included with the other storm-petrels in family Hydrobatidae.

- Wilson's storm-petrel, Oceanites oceanicus (V)

== Northern storm-petrels ==
Order: Procellariiformes Family: Hydrobatidae

Though the members of this family are similar in many respects to the southern storm-petrels, including their general appearance and habits, there are enough genetic differences to warrant their placement in a separate family.

- Leach's storm-petrel, Hydrobates leucorhous (V)

== Shearwaters ==
Order: Procellariiformes Family: Procellariidae

The procellariids are the main group of medium-sized "true petrels", characterized by united nostrils with medium septum and a long outer functional primary.

- Black-capped petrel, Pterodroma hasitata
- Bulwer's petrel, Bulweria bulwerii (V)
- Audubon's shearwater, Puffinus lherminieri (V)

== Frigatebirds ==
Order: Suliformes Family: Fregatidae

Frigatebirds are large seabirds usually found over tropical oceans. They are large, black-and-white, or completely black, with long wings and deeply forked tails. The males have colored inflatable throat pouches. They do not swim or walk and cannot take off from a flat surface. Having the largest wingspan-to-body-weight ratio of any bird, they are essentially aerial, able to stay aloft for more than a week.

- Magnificent frigatebird, Fregata magnificens

== Boobies ==
Order: Suliformes Family: Sulidae

The sulids comprise the gannets and boobies. Both groups are medium to large coastal seabirds that plunge-dive for fish.

- Masked booby, Sula dactylatra (V)
- Red-footed booby, Sula sula
- Brown booby, Sula leucogaster

== Cormorants ==
Order: Suliformes Family: Phalacrocoracidae

Phalacrocoracidae is a family of medium to large coastal, fish-eating seabirds that includes cormorants and shags. Plumage coloration varies, with the majority having mainly dark plumage, some species being black-and-white, and a few being colorful.

- Neotropic cormorant, Phalacrocorax brasilianus

== Pelicans ==
Order: Pelecaniformes Family: Pelecanidae

Pelicans are large water birds with a distinctive pouch under their beak. As with other members of the order Pelecaniformes, they have webbed feet with four toes.

- Brown pelican, Pelecanus occidentalis

== Herons ==
Order: Pelecaniformes Family: Ardeidae

The family Ardeidae contains the bitterns, herons, and egrets. Herons and egrets are medium to large wading birds with long necks and legs. Bitterns tend to be shorter necked and more wary. Members of Ardeidae fly with their necks retracted, unlike other long-necked birds such as storks, ibises, and spoonbills.

- Least bittern, Ixobrychus exilis (V)
- Little blue heron, Egretta caerulea
- Tricolored heron, Egretta tricolor
- Reddish egret, Egretta rufescens
- Snowy egret, Egretta thula
- Yellow-crowned night-heron, Nyctanassa violacea
- Black-crowned night-heron, Nycticorax nycticorax
- Striated heron, Butorides striata (V)
- Green heron, Butorides virescens
- Cattle egret, Ardea ibis
- Great egret, Ardea alba
- Great blue heron, Ardea herodias

== Ibises ==
Order: Pelecaniformes Family: Threskiornithidae

Threskiornithidae is a family of large terrestrial and wading birds which includes the ibises and spoonbills. They have long, broad wings with 11 primary and about 20 secondary feathers. They are strong fliers and despite their size and weight, very capable soarers.

- White ibis, Eudocimus albus (V)
- Scarlet ibis, Eudocimus ruber (V)
- Glossy ibis, Plegadis falcinellus
- Roseate spoonbill, Platalea ajaja (V)

== Osprey ==
Order: Accipitriformes Family: Pandionidae

The family Pandionidae contains only one species, the osprey. The osprey is a medium-large raptor which is a specialist fish-eater with a worldwide distribution.

- Osprey, Pandion haliaetus

== Hawks ==
Order: Accipitriformes Family: Accipitridae

Accipitridae is a family of birds of prey, which includes hawks, eagles, kites, harriers, and Old World vultures. These birds have powerful hooked beaks for tearing flesh from their prey, strong legs, powerful talons, and keen eyesight.

- Northern harrier, Circus hudsonius (V)
- White-tailed hawk, Geranoaetus albicaudatus

== Barn owls ==
Order: Strigiformes Family: Tytonidae

Barn owls are medium to large owls with large heads and characteristic heart-shaped faces. They have long strong legs with powerful talons.

- American barn owl, Tyto furcata

== Owls ==
Order: Strigiformes Family: Strigidae

The typical owls are small to large solitary nocturnal birds of prey. They have large forward-facing eyes and ears, a hawk-like beak, and a conspicuous circle of feathers around each eye called a facial disk.

- Burrowing owl, Athene cunicularia (V)

== Kingfishers ==
Order: Coraciiformes Family: Alcedinidae

Kingfishers are medium-sized birds with large heads, long pointed bills, short legs, and stubby tails.

- Ringed kingfisher, Megaceryle torquata (V)
- Belted kingfisher, Megaceryle alcyon

== Falcons ==
Order: Falconiformes Family: Falconidae

Falconidae is a family of diurnal birds of prey. They differ from hawks, eagles, and kites in that they kill with their beaks instead of their talons.

- Crested caracara, Caracara plancus
- Yellow-headed caracara, Milvago chimachima (V)
- American kestrel, Falco sparverius
- Merlin, Falco columbarius
- Peregrine falcon, Falco peregrinus

== Old World parrots ==
Order: Psittaciformes Family: Psittaculidae.

Characteristic features of parrots include a strong curved bill, an upright stance, strong legs, and clawed zygodactyl feet. Many parrots are vividly colored, and some are multi-colored. Old World parrots are found from Africa east across south and southeast Asia and Oceania to Australia and New Zealand.

- Rose-ringed parakeet, Psittacula krameri (I)

== New World and African parrots ==
Order: Psittaciformes Family: Psittacidae.

Parrots are small to large birds with a characteristic curved beak. Their upper mandibles have slight mobility in the joint with the skull and they have a generally erect stance. All parrots are zygodactyl, having the four toes on each foot placed two at the front and two to the back.

- Yellow-crowned amazon, Amazona ochrocephala (I)
- Yellow-shouldered amazon, Amazona barbadensis (I)
- Orange-winged amazon, Amazona amazonica (I)
- Green-rumped parrotlet, Forpus passerinus (I)
- Brown-throated parakeet, Eupsittula pertinax
- Chestnut-fronted macaw, Ara severus (I)
- Blue-crowned parakeet, Thectocercus acuticaudatus (I)
- Scarlet-fronted parakeet, Psittacara wagleri (I)

== Tyrant flycatchers ==
Order: Passeriformes Family: Tyrannidae

Tyrant flycatchers are passerine birds which occur throughout North and South America. They superficially resemble the Old World flycatchers, but are more robust and have stronger bills. They do not have the sophisticated vocal capabilities of the songbirds. Most, but not all, have plain coloring. As the name implies, most are insectivorous.

- Caribbean elaenia, Elaenia martinica
- Lesser elaenia, Elaenia chiriquensis (V)
- Northern scrub-flycatcher, Sublegatus arenarum
- Tropical kingbird, Tyrannus melancholicus
- Fork-tailed flycatcher, Tyrannus savana
- Gray kingbird, Tyrannus dominicensis
- Brown-crested flycatcher, Myiarchus tyrannulus

== Vireos ==
Order: Passeriformes Family: Vireonidae

The vireos are a group of small to medium-sized passerine birds. They are typically greenish in color and resemble New World warblers apart from their heavier bills.

- Yellow-throated vireo, Vireo flavifrons (V)
- Philadelphia vireo, Vireo philadelphicus (V)
- Red-eyed vireo, Vireo olivaceus
- Black-whiskered vireo, Vireo altiloquus

== Swallows ==
Order: Passeriformes Family: Hirundinidae

The family Hirundinidae is adapted to aerial feeding. They have a slender streamlined body, long pointed wings, and a short bill with a wide gape. The feet are adapted to perching rather than walking, and the front toes are partially joined at the base.

- Southern rough-winged swallow, Stelgidopteryx ruficollis (V)
- Purple martin, Progne subis
- Caribbean martin, Progne dominicensis
- Cuban martin, Progne cryptoleuca (V)
- White-winged swallow, Tachycineta albiventer (V)
- Chilean swallow, Tachycineta leucopyga (V)
- Bank swallow, Riparia riparia
- Barn swallow, Hirundo rustica
- Cliff swallow, Petrochelidon pyrrhonota
- Cave swallow, Petrochelidon fulva (V)

== Waxwings ==
Order: Passeriformes Family: Bombycillidae

The waxwings are a group of birds with soft silky plumage and unique red tips to some of the wing feathers. In the Bohemian and cedar waxwings, these tips look like sealing wax and give the group its name. These are arboreal birds of northern forests. They live on insects in summer and berries in winter.

- Cedar waxwing, Bombycilla cedrorum (V)

== Thrushes ==
Order: Passeriformes Family: Turdidae

The thrushes are a group of passerine birds that occur mainly in the Old World. They are plump, soft plumaged, small to medium-sized insectivores or sometimes omnivores, often feeding on the ground. Many have attractive songs.

- Veery, Catharus fuscescens
- Gray-cheeked thrush, Catharus minimus (V)
- Swainson's thrush, Catharus ustulatus (V)
- Wood thrush, Hylocichla mustelina (V)

== Old World flycatchers ==
Order: Passeriformes Family: Muscicapidae

The Old World flycatchers are a large family of small passerine birds mostly restricted to the Old World. These are mainly small arboreal insectivores, many of which, as the name implies, take their prey on the wing.

- Northern wheatear, Oenanthe oenanthe (U)

== Mockingbirds ==
Order: Passeriformes Family: Mimidae

The mimids are a family of passerine birds that includes thrashers, mockingbirds, tremblers, and the New World catbirds. These birds are notable for their vocalizations, especially their ability to mimic a wide variety of birds and other sounds heard outdoors. Their coloring tends towards dull-grays and browns.

- Tropical mockingbird, Mimus gilvus
- Brown thrasher, Toxostoma rufum (V)
- Pearly-eyed thrasher, Margarops fuscatus (V)

== Weavers ==
Order: Passeriformes Family: Ploceidae

The weavers are small passerine birds related to the finches. They are seed-eating birds with rounded conical bills. The males of many species are brightly colored, usually in red or yellow and black, some species show variation in color only in the breeding season.

- Village weaver, Ploceus cucullatus (I)
- African masked weaver, Ploceus velatus (I)

== Old World sparrows ==
Order: Passeriformes Family: Passeridae

Old World sparrows are small passerine birds. In general, sparrows tend to be small, plump, brown or gray birds with short tails and short powerful beaks. Sparrows are seed eaters, but they also consume small insects.

- House sparrow, Passer domesticus (I)

== Sparrows ==
Order: Passeriformes Family: Passerellidae

Most of the species are known as sparrows, but these birds are not closely related to the Old World sparrows which are in the family Passeridae. Many of these have distinctive head patterns.

- Grasshopper sparrow, Ammodramus savannarum
- Rufous-collared sparrow, Zonotrichia capensis

== Blackbirds ==
Order: Passeriformes Family: Icteridae

The icterids are a group of small to medium-sized, often colorful, passerine birds restricted to the New World and include the grackles, New World blackbirds, and New World orioles. Most species have black as the predominant plumage color, often enlivened by yellow, orange, or red.

- Bobolink, Dolichonyx oryzivorus
- Red-breasted meadowlark, Leistes militaris
- Venezuelan troupial, Icterus icterus
- Orchard oriole, Icterus spurius (V)
- Yellow oriole, Icterus nigrogularis
- Shiny cowbird, Molothrus bonariensis
- Carib grackle, Quiscalus lugubris
- Great-tailed grackle, Quiscalus mexicanus
- Yellow-hooded blackbird, Chrysomus icterocephalus (V)

== Wood-warblers ==
Order: Passeriformes Family: Parulidae

The wood-warblers are a group of small, often colorful, passerine birds restricted to the New World. Most are arboreal, but some are terrestrial. Most members of this family are insectivores.

- Ovenbird, Seiurus aurocapilla
- Worm-eating warbler, Helmitheros vermivorum (U)
- Northern waterthrush, Parkesia noveboracensis
- Louisiana waterthrush, Parkesia motacilla (V)
- Black-and-white warbler, Mniotilta varia
- Prothonotary warbler, Protonotaria citrea
- Tennessee warbler, Leiothlypis peregrina (V)
- Connecticut warbler, Oporornis agilis
- Mourning warbler, Geothlypis philadelphia (V)
- Kentucky warbler, Geothlypis formosa (V)
- Common yellowthroat, Geothlypis trichas (V)
- American redstart, Setophaga ruticilla
- Cape May warbler, Setophaga tigrina (V)
- Northern parula, Setophaga americana
- Magnolia warbler, Setophaga magnolia (V)
- Bay-breasted warbler, Setophaga castanea (V)
- Blackburnian warbler, Setophaga fusca (V)
- Yellow warbler, Setophaga petechia
- Blackpoll warbler, Setophaga striata
- Palm warbler, Setophaga palmarum (V)
- Yellow-rumped warbler, Setophaga coronata (V)
- Prairie warbler, Setophaga discolor (V)
- Black-throated green warbler, Setophaga virens (V)

== Cardinal grosbeaks ==
Order: Passeriformes Family: Cardinalidae

The cardinals are a family of robust, seed-eating birds with strong bills. They are typically associated with open woodland. The sexes usually have distinct plumages.

- Summer tanager, Piranga rubra (V)
- Scarlet tanager, Piranga olivacea
- Rose-breasted grosbeak, Pheucticus ludovicianus
- Indigo bunting, Passerina cyanea
- Dickcissel, Spiza americana

== Tanagers ==
Order: Passeriformes Family: Thraupidae

The tanagers are a large group of small to medium-sized passerine birds restricted to the New World, mainly in the tropics. Many species are brightly colored. They are seed eaters, but their preference tends towards fruit and nectar. Most have short, rounded wings.

- Saffron finch, Sicalis flaveola (I)
- Blue-black grassquit, Volatinia jacarina (V)
- Red-legged honeycreeper, Cyanerpes cyaneus (V)
- Swallow tanager, Tersina viridis (U)
- Bananaquit, Coereba flaveola
- Black-faced grassquit, Melanospiza bicolor

== See also ==
- List of birds
- Lists of birds by region

== Other reading ==
- de Boer, Bart; Newton, Eric; Restall, Robin (2012). Birds of Aruba, Curaçao and Bonaire. Christopher Helm. ISBN 9781408137277.
