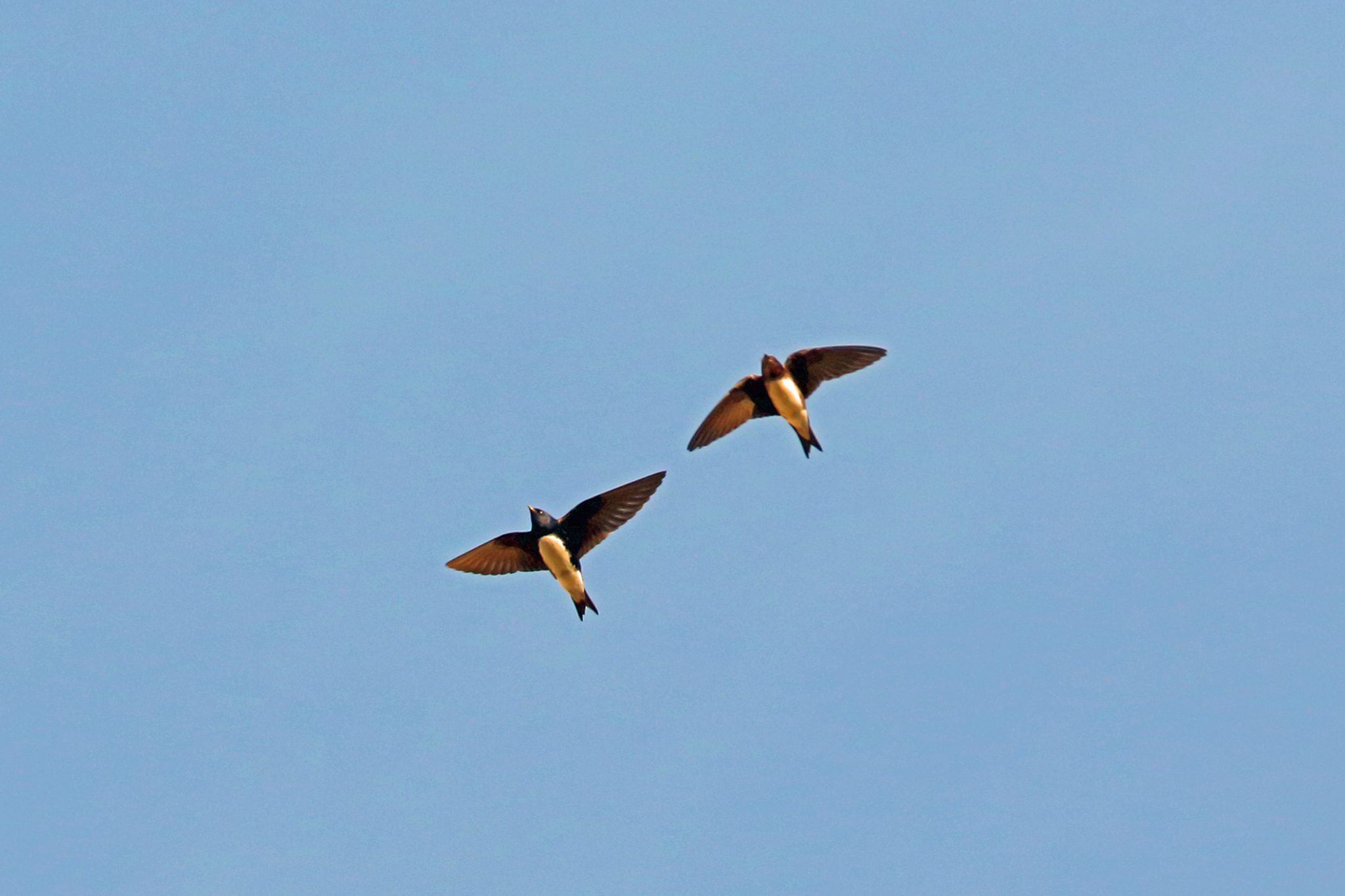

Conservation status
- Vulnerable (IUCN 3.1)

Scientific classification
- Kingdom: Animalia
- Phylum: Chordata
- Class: Aves
- Order: Passeriformes
- Family: Hirundinidae
- Genus: Progne
- Species: P. sinaloae

Binomial name
- Progne sinaloae Nelson, 1898
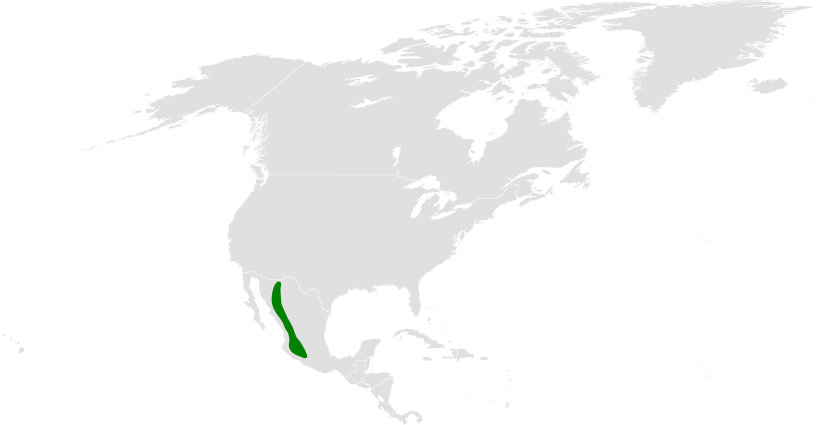
- Breeding distribution (winter distribution unknown)

= Sinaloa martin =

Species of bird

The Sinaloa martin (Progne sinaloae) is a Vulnerable species of bird in the family Hirundinidae, the swallows and martins. It breeds in Mexico; its wintering range is not known but is believed to be in South America. There is one record from Guatemala.

== Taxonomy and systematics ==
The Sinaloa martin was originally described in 1898 with its present binomial Progne sinaloae. Since then it has variously been considered conspecific with what is now the Caribbean martin (P. dominicensis), with the Cuban martin (P. cryptoleuca) and Caribbean martin, and with the purple martin (P. subis), Caribbean martin, and Cuban martin.

The Sinaloa martin is monotypic.

== Description ==
The Sinaloa martin is 17 to 18.5 cm (6.7 to 7.3 in) long; three individuals weighed between 42 and 43.7 g (1.5 and 1.5 oz). The sexes are dimorphic; both have a slightly forked tail. Adult males are mostly glossy steel-blue. Their wings and tail are black with a bluish gloss. Their lower breast and belly are white and their undertail coverts white with dark spots. Females have duller blue upperparts than males and sometimes have gray-brown mottling there. Their face, throat, upper breast, and flanks are dusky brown though the middle of the throat is paler than the breast. Their lower breast, belly, and undertail coverts are white. The two breast colors have a sharp demarcation. Both sexes are very similar to those of the Caribbean martin and less so to those of the purple martin.

== Distribution and habitat ==
The known range of the Sinaloa martin is on the western slope of Mexico's Sierra Madre Occidental from northeastern Sonora south to Jalisco and Michoacán. It is present there only between February and September. Its range during the rest of the year is unknown but is suspected to be northern South America. A March record in Guatemala and sight records of birds flying south over Belize in late August suggest that it makes this migration. However, the South American Classification Committee has no records from the continent.

In Mexico the Sinaloa martin primarily inhabits pine and pine-oak forest in the subtropical and lower tropical zones. In elevation it ranges between 1,100 and 2,800 m (3,600 and 9,200 ft).

== Behavior ==
=== Movement ===
The Sinaloa martin is a complete migrant, entirely vacating its breeding range in the non-breeding season. Its migration path and wintering range are not known though it is thought to migrate to northern South America.

=== Feeding ===
Almost nothing is known about the Sinaloa martin's diet or feeding behavior. It is assumed to feed on insects captured in mid-air like other members of genus Progne. It has been observed foraging over "pine-oak woodlands, pastures, orchards, and the barranca edge".

=== Breeding ===
The Sinaloa martin breeds within the March to August or early September span. It breeds in small colonies, typically in cavities in dead trees and cliff faces. Its nest, eggs, clutch size, incubation period, time to fledging, and details of parental care are unknown.

=== Vocalization ===
The Sinaloa martin's vocalizations are similar to those of other Progne martins; for examples see here and here.

== Status ==
The IUCN originally in 1988 assessed the Sinaloa martin as being of Lower Risk/least concern, then in 1994 as Data Deficient, and since 2012 as Vulnerable. Only its breeding range is known and it breeds only locally within it. Its estimated population of between 2500 and 10,000 mature individuals is believed to be decreasing. "The causes of the decline in this species are unknown." Some authors suggest that logging of Mexico's montane forest has contributed but hesitate to name that the only cause. They state that there is little competition for nest holes from house sparrows (Passer domesticus) and European starlings (Sturnus vulgaris) due to those species' low populations in the Sinaloa martin's range. They further note that up to the time of their report there was apparently little interest in the species by ornithologists and birders.
