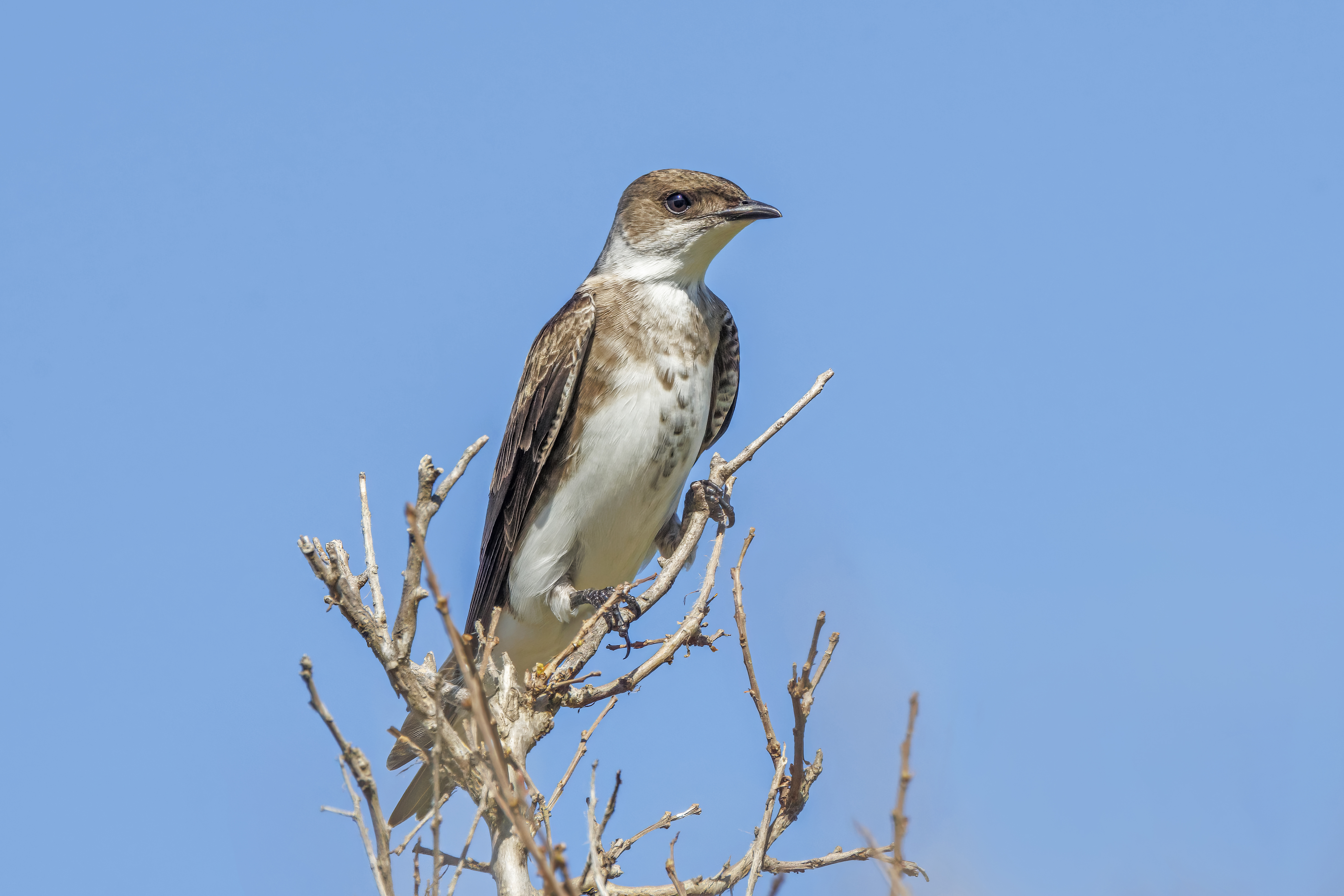
- Brown-chested martin (Progne tapera)

Scientific classification
- Kingdom: Animalia
- Phylum: Chordata
- Class: Aves
- Order: Passeriformes
- Family: Hirundinidae
- Subfamily: Hirundininae
- Genus: Progne; F. Boie, 1826

Type species
- Hirundo purpurea = Hirundo subis

Species
- 9, See text

= Progne =

Genus of birds

Progne is a genus of passerine birds in the swallow family Hirundinidae. The species are found in the New World and all have "martin" in their common name.

== Taxonomy ==
The genus Progne was introduced in 1826 by the German zoologist Friedrich Boie for the purple martin. The genus name refers to Procne (Πρόκνη), a Greek mythological queen who was turned into a swallow to save her from her husband Tereus. She had killed their son Itys to avenge the rape of her sister Philomela.

The genus contains the following nine species:

Image	Scientific name	Common name	Distribution
	Progne tapera	Brown-chested martin	Argentina, Bolivia, Brazil, Chile, Colombia, Costa Rica, Ecuador, French Guiana, Guyana, Panama, Paraguay, Peru, Puerto Rico, Suriname, the United States, Uruguay, Venezuela, a vagrant to Chile and the Falkland Islands
	Progne murphyi	Peruvian martin	Peru and far northern Chile
	Progne modesta	Galapagos martin	Galápagos Islands
	Progne subis	Purple martin	West Coast from British Columbia to Mexico, to East Coast
	Progne elegans	Southern martin	Argentina and southern Bolivia
	Progne chalybea	Grey-breasted martin	Central and South America
	Progne sinaloae	Sinaloa martin	Mexico
	Progne cryptoleuca	Cuban martin	Cuba
	Progne dominicensis	Caribbean martin	Mainland Central and South America, Caribbean islands from Jamaica east to Tobago
