= Grey-breasted martin =

- Male P. c. chalybea, in Costa Rica
- Female P. c. macrorhamphus, in Brazil

Conservation status
- Least Concern (IUCN 3.1)

Scientific classification
- Kingdom: Animalia
- Phylum: Chordata
- Class: Aves
- Order: Passeriformes
- Family: Hirundinidae
- Genus: Progne
- Species: P. chalybea

Binomial name
- Progne chalybea (Gmelin, JF, 1789)
- Breeding Year-round

Species of bird

The grey-breasted martin (Progne chalybea) is a large swallow from Central and South America.

== Taxonomy ==
In 1760 the French zoologist Mathurin Jacques Brisson included a description of the grey-breasted martin in the second volume of his Ornithologie based on a specimen collected in Cayenne, French Guiana. He used the French name L'hirondelle de Cayenne and the Latin name Hirundo Cayanensis. Although Brisson coined Latin names, these do not conform to the binomial system and are not recognised by the International Commission on Zoological Nomenclature. The grey-breasted martin was subsequently described by the French polymath, the Comte de Buffon, in 1779 and by the English ornithologist John Latham in 1783. Latham used the English name "Chalybeate swallow" but neither Buffon nor Latham introduced a scientific name.

The German naturalist Johann Friedrich Gmelin included the grey-breasted martin when he revised and expanded Carl Linnaeus's Systema Naturae in 1789. He placed it with the swallows in the genus Hirundo and coined the binomial name Hirundo chalybea. The specific epithet chalybea is Latin meaning "steely". The grey-breasted martin is now one of nine species placed in the genus Progne that was introduced in 1826 by the German zoologist Friedrich Boie.

=== Subspecies ===
The three subspecies and their distributions are:

- P. c. chalybea (Gmelin, 1789) – nominate, breeds from Mexico through Central America south to central Brazil, and on Trinidad
- P. c. warneri Phillips, A.R., 1986 – found in western Mexico
- P. c. macrorhamphus Brooke, 1974 – breeds further south in South America to central Argentina

The southern subspecies migrates north as far as Venezuela during the southern hemisphere's winter, and the nominate form also undertakes local movements after the breeding season.

== Description ==
The grey-breasted martin is 16–18 cm (6.3–7.1 in) in length and weighs 33–50 g (1.2–1.8 oz). It has a forked tail and relatively broad wings. The adult male is glossy blue-black with the grey-brown throat, breast and sides contrasting with the white lower underparts. The female is duller than the male with a paler throat; the juveniles have dull brown upperparts.

== Behaviour ==
Breeding male P. c. macrorhamphus, in Uruguay

=== Breeding ===
The grey-breasted martin nests in cavities in banks and buildings, or old woodpecker holes. Normally, two to four eggs are laid in the lined nest, and incubated for 15–16 days, with another 22 days to fledging.

=== Diet ===
Grey-breasted martins are gregarious birds that hunt for insects in flight. Their call is a gurgly chew-chew, similar to that of the closely related Caribbean martin. The latter species is slightly larger, and has more contrasting underparts.
