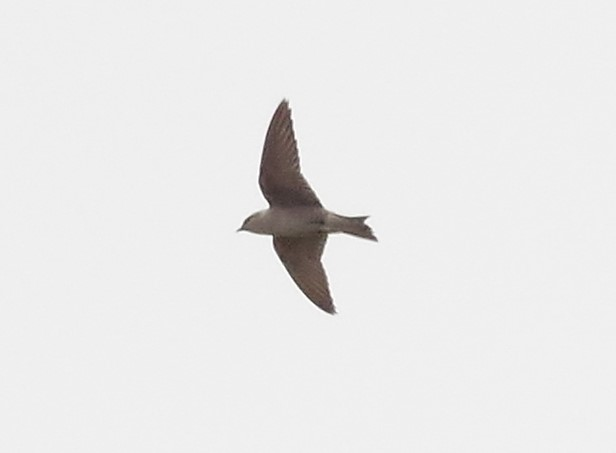

Conservation status
- Near Threatened (IUCN 3.1)

Scientific classification
- Kingdom: Animalia
- Phylum: Chordata
- Class: Aves
- Order: Passeriformes
- Family: Hirundinidae
- Genus: Progne
- Species: P. murphyi

Binomial name
- Progne murphyi Chapman, 1925

= Peruvian martin =

Species of bird

The Peruvian martin (Progne murphyi) is a Near Threatened species of bird in the family Hirundinidae, the swallows and martins. It is found in primarily in Peru and far northern Chile with some records in Colombia.

== Taxonomy and systematics ==
The Peruvian martin was originally described by Frank M. Chapman as Progne murphyi. Chapman named it honor of Robert Cushman Murphy, who collected the specimens that enabled him to describe the new species. For much of the twentieth century many authors treated the Peruvian martin and southern martin (P. elegans) as conspecific with the Galapagos martin (P. modesta). By the end of the century this treatment was in question and a study published in 2008 confirmed it as a separate species.

The Peruvian martin is monotypic.

== Description ==
The Peruvian martin is 16.5 to 17 cm (6.5 to 6.7 in) long and weighs 30 to 37 g (1.1 to 1.3 oz). The sexes are dimorphic. Adult males have a glossy blue-black head and upperparts. Their tail is slightly forked; it and their wings are fuscous-black with a slight bluish sheen on their coverts. Their underparts are somewhat bluer and duller than their upperparts with fuscous-black undertail coverts. Females have a mouse-gray head with black lores. Their upperparts are mouse-gray with a shiny steel-blue band across the middle of the back and the scapulars and blue-black tips on some rump feathers. Their wings and tail are a duller blue than those of males. Their underparts are mostly mouse-gray with grayish white undertail coverts.

== Distribution and habitat ==
The Peruvian martin is known to breed only in northern Peru, in the departments of Piura and La Libertad. Non-breeding individuals are found intermittently along the rest of the coast and slightly into extreme northwestern Chile. These more southerly sightings "might suggest undiscovered breeding sites". There are also historical records further inland. Non-breeding individuals have been documented in Colombia.

The Peruvian martin inhabits semi-open to open landscapes. These include offshore islands and coastal cliffs, pastures, agricultural areas, and scrublands. Sources differ greatly on the species' elevational range. One states its upper limit as 100 m (300 ft) and another as 1,500 m (4,900 ft).

== Behavior ==
=== Movement ===
Though it is apparently not a conventional migrant, the Peruvian martin is known away from northern Peru only as a non-breeder.

=== Feeding ===
The Peruvian martin is assumed to feed on insects captured in mid-air, though its foraging behavior and diet have not been studied.

=== Breeding ===
The Peruvian martin's breeding biology has not been studied. It is believed to nest in small colonies in crevices in cliffs and stone walls.

=== Vocalization ===
As of January 2026 xeno-canto had a single recording of Peruvian martin vocalizations; the Cornell Lab's Macaulay Library had five others. The vocalizations have not been put into words.

== Status ==
The IUCN originally in 2005 assessed the Peruvian martin as Vulnerable and since 2020 as Near Threatened. It has a very limited range and its estimated population of between 2500 and 10,000 mature individuals is believed to be decreasing. "Threats to the species are unknown. Given the ecology of Peruvian Martin, it has been hypothesised that the species may be impacted by competition for nest sites with seabirds and nest predation, but potentially also intensification of agriculture and subsequent pesticide use. It however remains to be confirmed whether these threats have any impacts on the species." Field guide authors consider it rare.
