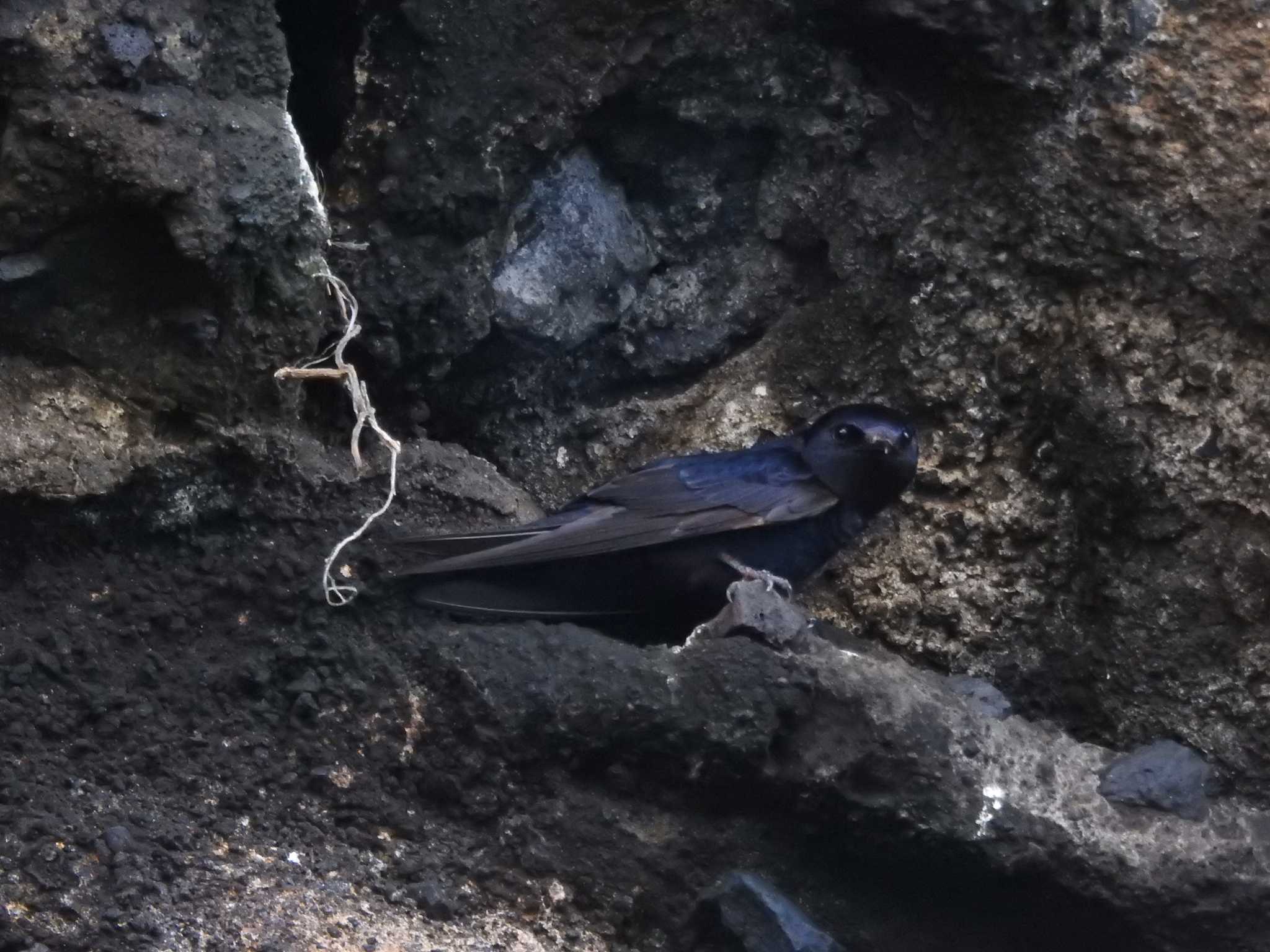

Conservation status
- Endangered (IUCN 3.1)

Scientific classification
- Kingdom: Animalia
- Phylum: Chordata
- Class: Aves
- Order: Passeriformes
- Family: Hirundinidae
- Genus: Progne
- Species: P. modesta

Binomial name
- Progne modesta Gould, 1838

= Galápagos martin =

Species of bird

The Galapagos martin (Progne modesta) is an Endangered species of bird in the family Hirundinidae, the swallows and martins. It is endemic to the Galápagos Islands.

== Taxonomy and systematics ==
The Galapagos martin was originally described by John Gould in 1837 as Hirundo concolor. However, that binomial had earlier been assigned to another species, the dusky crag martin, so following the principle of priority Gould renamed it Progne modesta in 1838. For much of the twentieth century many authors treated the Galapagos martin, Peruvian martin (P. murphyi), and the southern martin (P. elegans) as conspecific.

The Galapagos martin is monotypic.

== Description ==
The Galapagos martin is about 15 cm (5.9 in) long. The sexes are dimorphic. Adult males have a glossy dark violaceous steel-blue body. Their wings and tail are black with a faint bluish or greenish sheen. Females have a mostly black head and upperparts with a sooty crown and rump and a strong violaceous steel-blue gloss on the back and scapulars. Their underparts are mostly dark sooty gray or grayish sooty with indistinct pale tips on the feathers. Both sexes have a brown iris, a black bill, and brownish black or dusky brown legs and feet.

== Distribution and habitat ==
The Galapagos martin is found on the central and southern islands of the Galápagos archipeligo but is absent from the five northernmost. It is most common on Isabela and is rare on Española. It has historically inhabited most of the islands' landscapes including built-up areas but is now found mostly in the highlands up to about 1,500 m (4,900 ft) above sea level.

== Behavior ==
=== Movement ===
The Galapagos martin is a year-round resident.

=== Feeding ===
The Galapagos martin feeds on insects captured in mid-air. Though its diet has not been fully described it is known to include moths and butterflies. It is believed to forage in small flocks, primarily low to the ground. Its flight "consists of alternating flaps and glides".

=== Breeding ===
The Galapagos martin is believed to breed during the warm wet season centered in March. Two nests were in cavities on seaside cliffs; they were made from grass and lined with feathers. One contained two white eggs and the other three. Nothing else is known about the species' breeding biology.

=== Vocalization ===
The Galapagos martin's most frequently heard vocalizations are "a short, warbling song, a twittering flight call cher-cher, and a high-pitched alarm call".

== Status ==
The IUCN originally in 2005 assessed the Galapagos martin as Vulnerable and since 2012 as Endangered. It has a limited range and its estimated population of between 250 and 1000 mature individuals is believed to be decreasing. "Little is known about the threats to this species. Past and ongoing declines are likely to be due to introduced diseases and parasites [and] to introduced nest predators (e.g. rats Rattus). Climate change may also impact the species by reducing food availability, particularly important in insectivorous species such as P. modesta. It is considered overall uncommon with varying numbers on different islands.
