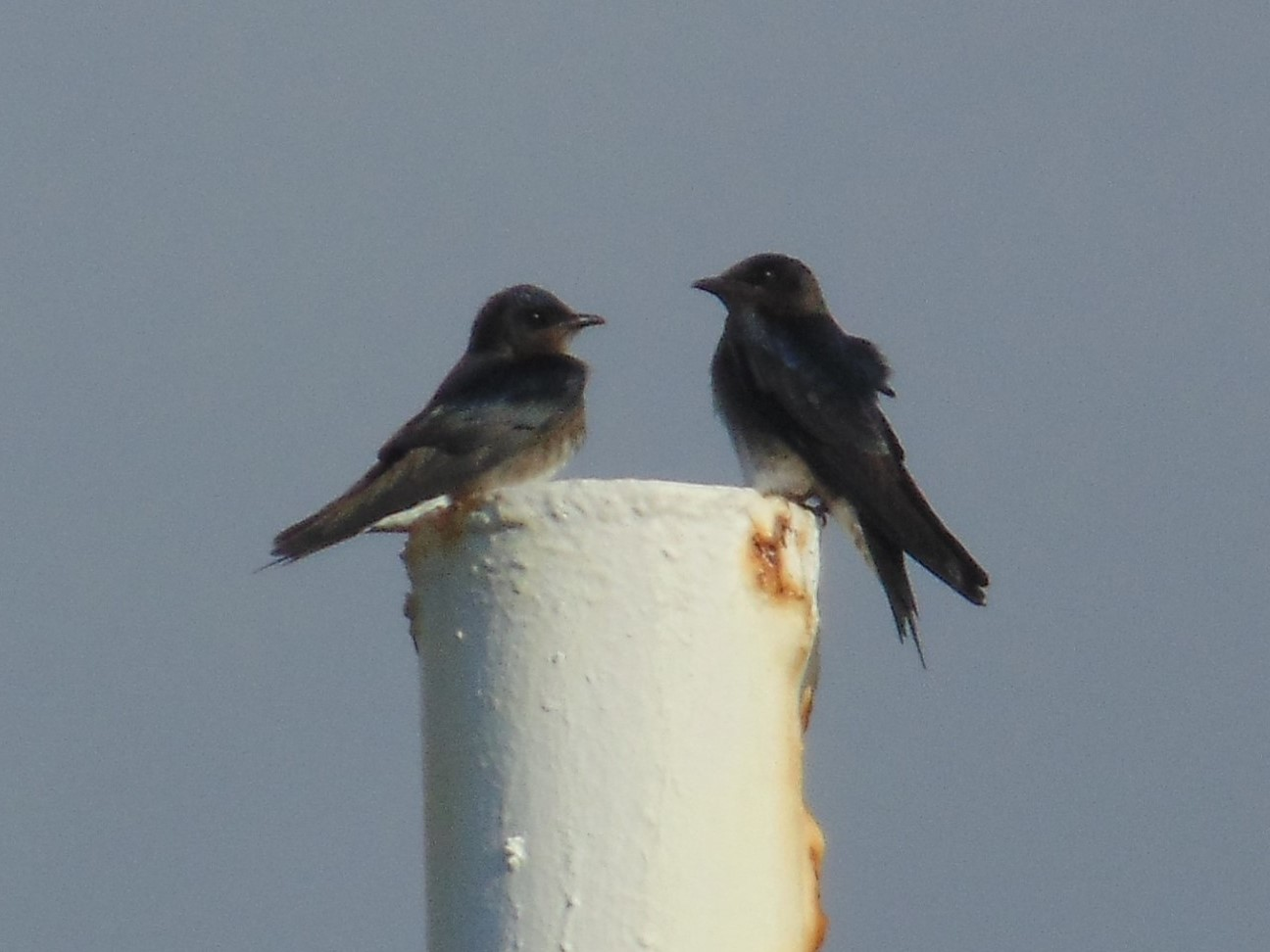
- In Havana, Cuba

Conservation status
- Least Concern (IUCN 3.1)

Scientific classification
- Kingdom: Animalia
- Phylum: Chordata
- Class: Aves
- Order: Passeriformes
- Family: Hirundinidae
- Genus: Progne
- Species: P. cryptoleuca

Binomial name
- Progne cryptoleuca S.F. Baird, 1865

= Cuban martin =

Species of bird

The Cuban martin (Progne cryptoleuca) is a large swallow endemic to Cuba.

It is closely related to the Caribbean martin (P. dominicensis), which breeds on Caribbean islands from Jamaica east to Tobago, and the Sinaloa martin (P. sinaloae), which breeds in Mexico.

It has at various times been considered alternatively as a race of the purple martin, Progne subis.

== Description ==
Adult Cuban martins are 18.5 cm in length, with a forked tail and relatively broad wings, and weigh 40 g. Adult males are a glossy blue-black with contrasting white lower underparts. Females and juveniles are duller than the male, with grey-brown breast and flanks and white lower underparts.

Adult male Cuban martins can be distinguished from adult male Caribbean martins by their dark bellies: Caribbean martins have a prominent white patch on theirs. Adult females and immatures aren't as easily distinguished.

On the other hand, adult male Cuban martins and Purple martins cannot be reliably distinguished in the field. Adult female and immature Purple martins have a scaly breast pattern which can be used to distinguish the two species.

Unlike these two similar species, the Cuban martin is endemic to Cuba and Isla de la Juventud. Purple martins and Caribbean martins are migratory species that are only present in the Cuban martin's range during winter.

== Behavior ==
The Cuban martin nests in cavities in banks and buildings, or old woodpecker holes. 3-6 eggs are laid in the lined nest, and incubated for 15 days, with another 26–27 to fledging. Just as the purple martin, this species may compete with other passerines for nesting cavities. In particular, the main foe is the house sparrow in urban areas, where they mostly use man-made structures, whereas in more rural locations Picidae holes in coconut trees are favored, and there is less competition with the sparrows.

Cuban martins are gregarious birds which hunt for insects in flight. They are often found in large, sometimes mixed flocks of up to 20 birds. Their call is a gurgly chew-chew.

Despite being considered endemic to Cuba and Isla de la Juventud, occasional vagrant individuals have been reported in Florida.
