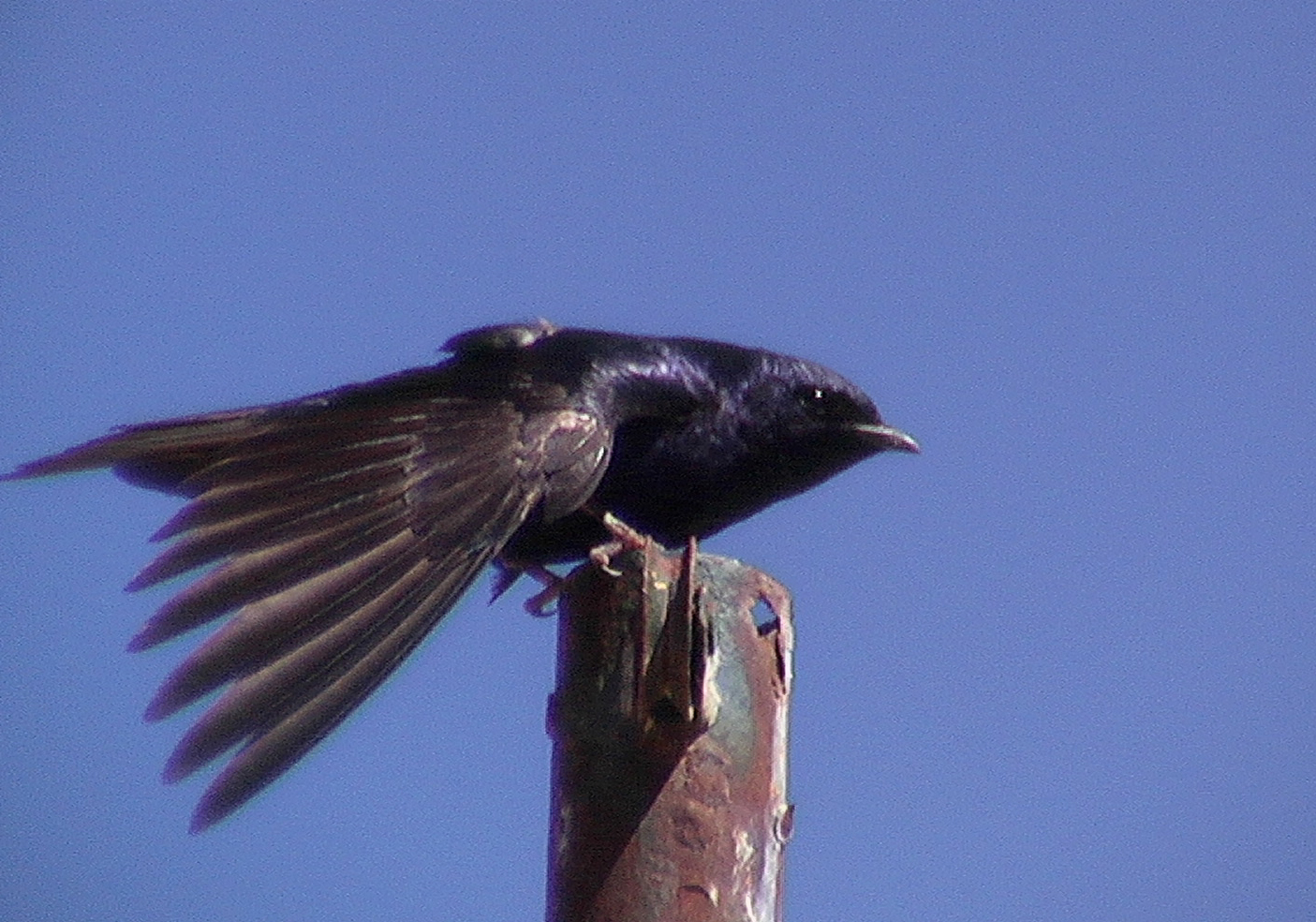
- Male in Punta Tombo, Argentina

Conservation status
- Least Concern (IUCN 3.1)

Scientific classification
- Kingdom: Animalia
- Phylum: Chordata
- Class: Aves
- Order: Passeriformes
- Family: Hirundinidae
- Genus: Progne
- Species: P. elegans

Binomial name
- Progne elegans Baird, 1865
- Range map from BirdLife International Breeding Non-Breeding Migration

= Southern martin =

Species of bird

The southern martin (Progne elegans) is a species of bird in the family Hirundinidae, the swallows and martins. One source states that it is known in every mainland South American country except Colombia, Guyana, and Venezuela, and there are undocumented sight records in those three countries. It has occurred as a vagrant in the Malvinas/Falkland Islands and the U.S. state of Florida

== Taxonomy and systematics ==
The southern martin was originally described with its present binomial Progne elegans. For much of the twentieth century many authors treated the southern martin and Peruvian martin (P. murphyi) as conspecific with the Galapagos martin (P. modesta).

The southern martin is monotypic.

== Description ==
The southern martin is 17 to 20 cm (6.7 to 7.9 in) long. The sexes are dimorphic though both have a deeply forked tail. Adult males are almost entirely glossy steel-blue with blacker wings and tail. Females have duller steel-blue upperparts than males. Their underparts are mostly dusky brown with paler feather edges that give a scaly appearance; their undertail coverts are white with dusky streaks. Juveniles resemble adult females.

== Distribution and habitat ==
Sources do not agree on the range of the southern martin. The South American Classification Committee states that it breeds in Argentina, Bolivia, and Chile and occurs as a non-breeder in Brazil, Ecuador, French Guiana, Paraguay, Peru, Suriname, and Uruguay. The committee has unconfirmed sight records from Colombia, Guyana, and Venezuela and confirmed records of vagrancy to the Malvinas/Falkland Islands. BirdLife International (BLI) adds Paraguay and Uruguay to its breeding range, lists it as non-breeding in Brazil, Colombia, Panama, and Peru, and does not include any other countries in its range. The Cornell Lab of Ornithology's Birds of the World states that it breeds in southern Bolivia and Argentina and spends the austral winter in Brazil, Colombia, and Peru "but possibly also as far [north] as [eastern] Panama". It further notes that some may overwinter in Argentina, that it has been recorded in Uruguay, and that it is accidental in the Malvinas/Falklands and Florida. The American Ornithological Society states that the species breeds in Argentina, Bolivia, Paraguay, and Uruguay and winters in Brazil, Colombia, and Peru. It notes that sight records in Panama "may pertain to this species" and notes vagrancy to the Falklands and Florida.

The southern martin inhabits a variety of semi-open to open landscapes including grasslands, woodlands, scrublands, and areas of human habitation. As is the case with the species' range, its upper elevation limit differs among sources. It is noted as 500 m (1,600 ft), 2,600 m (8,500 ft), and 4,270 m (14,000 ft). It is stated to reach 2,500 m (8,200 ft) in Brazil.

== Behavior ==
=== Movement ===
The southern martin appears to be a complete migrant or nearly so. Its migratory behavior is ill-defined as noted in the Distribution section above.

=== Feeding ===
The southern martin feeds on insects captured in mid-air; its diet is known to include moths and butterflies (Lepidoptera), dragon- and damselflies (Odonata), and Hymenoptera such as ants and termites. It forages singly or in small flocks, flying low over the ground and higher in the air. Its flight is often slow and it frequently glides.

=== Breeding ===
The southern martin's breeding season appears to span from October to February or March. It nests in cavities, both natural and not, in earthen banks, cliffs, trees, and human structures. It builds a nest of grass, twigs, and a few feathers in the cavity. The clutch is three to five eggs. The incubation period, time to fledging, and details of parental care are not known.

=== Vocalization ===
The southern martin's song is "a short gurgle"; it also makes "a harsh contact call and an alarm call".

== Status ==
The IUCN has assessed the southern martin as being of Least Concern. It has a very large range; its population size is not known but is believed to be stable. No immediate threats have been identified. In the core of its breeding and non-breeding ranges it is "[f]airly common, especially around towns and cultivated areas". It is considered "common to frequent" in Brazil. In Peru it "winters in large numbers along [the] Amazon near Iquitos" but is less common further south during migration. At the edges of its non-breeding range it is "casual" in Ecuador and "uncommon" in Colombia.
