= Christopher Helm =

Scottish book publisher

Logo of the "Christopher Helm" identification guide books

Christopher Alexander Roger Helm (born Dundee, 1 February 1937 – 20 January 2007) was a Scottish book publisher, notably of ornithology related titles, including the Helm Identification Guides.

Born in Dundee, he was raised in Forfar, where his father was a Presbyterian minister. The family moved to Tunbridge Wells at the start of World War II, and he was educated at Harrow School, then, after active duty in Cyprus with the Highland Light Infantry (as National Service), he graduated in classics and law from Gonville and Caius College, Cambridge in 1960.

Having worked for Macmillan, he set up and, in turn, sold each of Croom Helm (founded in 1972, bought by Associated Book Publishers in 1986 and merged into the Routledge imprint in 1992), Christopher Helm Publishers and Pica Press (both of the latter pair being bought by A & C Black, now part of Bloomsbury Publishing Plc).

He was an active member of the council of the British Ornithologists' Union, becoming vice-president in 1995.

In the 1970s, he served as a Labour councillor in the London Borough of Wandsworth.

He married twice: in 1967 to Caroline Price, they had two sons, Alexander (who died from cystic fibrosis) and Zebedee; their marriage was dissolved in 1976; and in 1979 to Amanda Thomas, with whom he had a daughter Annabel and another son, Tom.
