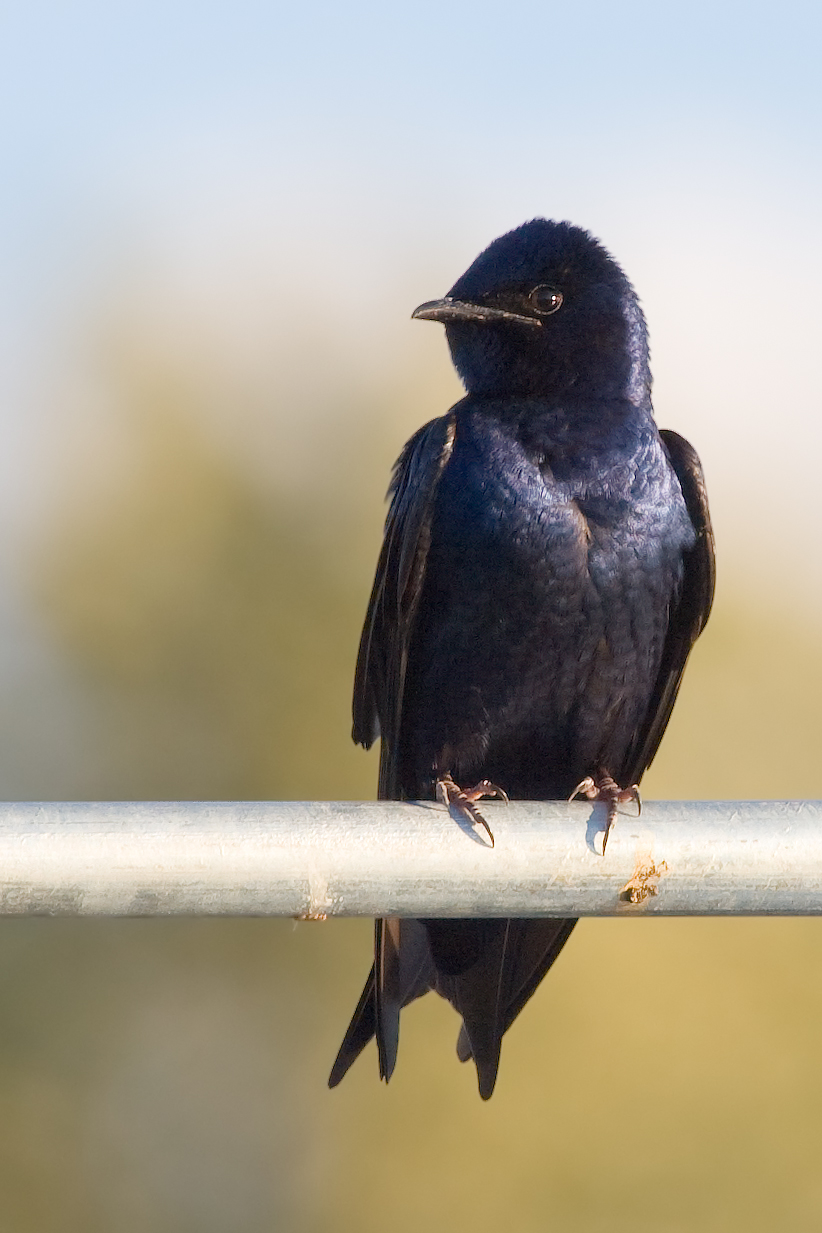
- Adult male
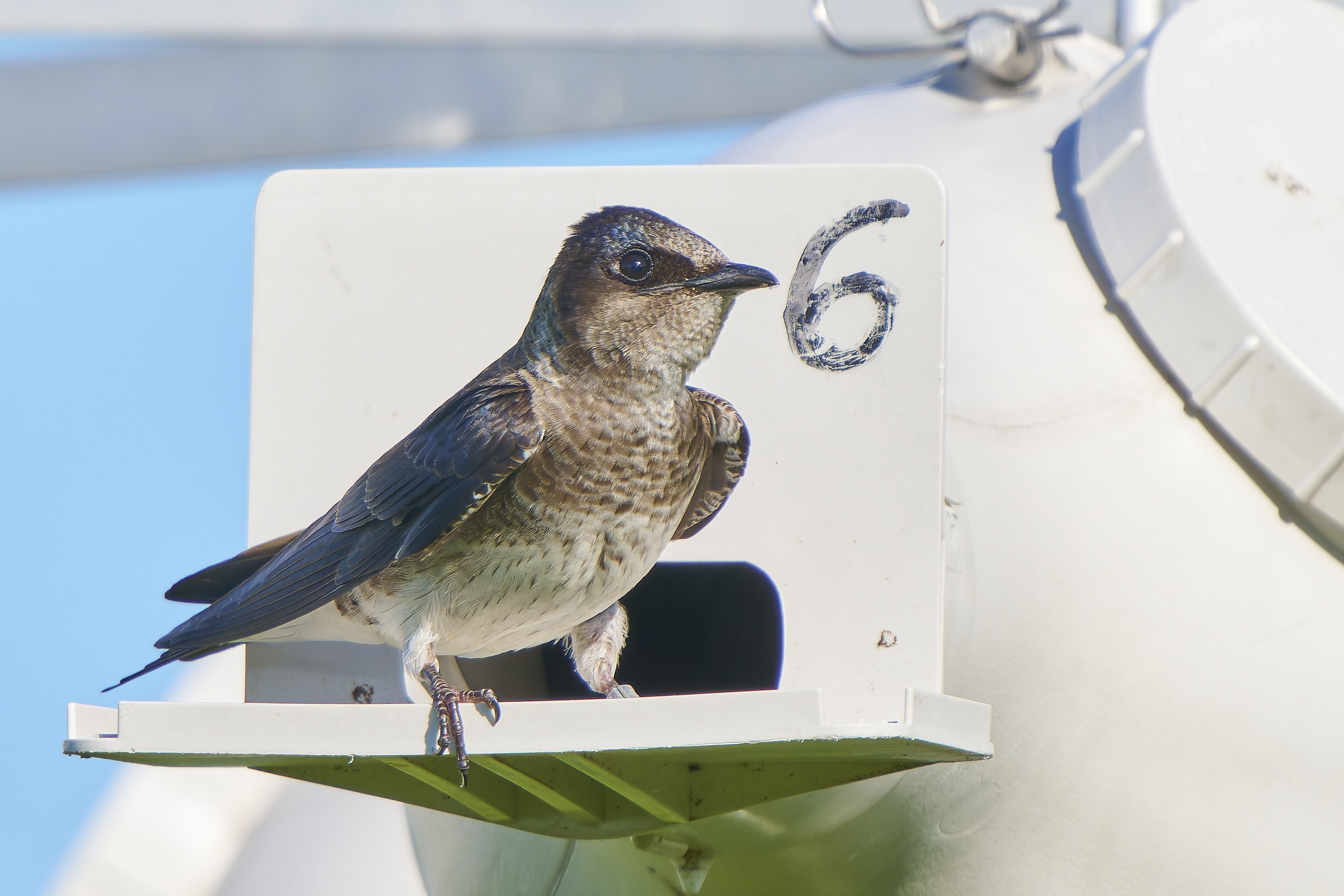
- Adult female

Conservation status
- Least Concern (IUCN 3.1)

Scientific classification
- Kingdom: Animalia
- Phylum: Chordata
- Class: Aves
- Order: Passeriformes
- Family: Hirundinidae
- Genus: Progne
- Species: P. subis

Binomial name
- Progne subis (Linnaeus, 1758)
- Approximate distribution map Breeding Migration Non-breeding

Synonyms
- Hirundo subis Linnaeus, 1758

= Purple martin =

Species of bird

The purple martin (Progne subis) is a passerine bird in the swallow family Hirundinidae. It is the largest swallow in North America. They breed across the eastern United States and southeastern Canada, as well as the coastal Pacific Northwest, Baja California, Arizona, and New Mexico. Most make a brief stopover in the Yucatán Peninsula or Cuba during pre-breeding migration to North America and during post-breeding migration before reaching their overwintering sites in South America.

They are known for their speed, agility, and their characteristic mix of rapid, flapping, and gliding flight patterns. When approaching their nesting site, they will dive from the sky at great speeds with their wings tucked, just like the peregrine falcon does when hunting smaller birds.

== Taxonomy ==
In 1750 the English naturalist George Edwards included an illustration and a description of the purple martin in the third volume of his A Natural History of Uncommon Birds. He used the English name "The Great American Martin". Edwards based his hand-coloured etching on a preserved specimen that had been brought to London from the Hudson Bay area of Canada by James Isham. When in 1758 the Swedish naturalist Carl Linnaeus updated his Systema Naturae for the tenth edition, he placed the purple martin with swallows and swifts in the genus Hirundo. Linnaeus included a brief description, coined the binomial name Hirundo subis and cited Edwards' work.

The purple martin is now placed in the genus Progne that was introduced in 1826 by the German zoologist Friedrich Boie. The genus name Progne is from Greek mythology. Progne or Procne (Πρόκνη), the daughter of King Pandion of Athens and wife of King Tereus of Thrace was transformed into a swallow. The specific epithet subis is Latin for a bird mentioned by the Roman author Nigidius Figulus that could break eagles' eggs. It may have been applied to this species because of its aggression toward birds of prey when it is nesting.

Three subspecies are recognised:

- P. s. subis (Linnaeus, 1758) – nominate form, south Canada, east USA, and east Mexico. Winters through South America east of the Andes
- P. s. hesperia Brewster, 1889 – southwest USA and northwest Mexico. Perhaps winters in South America.
- P. s. arboricola Behle, 1968 – west USA and north Mexico. Perhaps winters in South America.

== Description ==
With an average length of 20 cm (7.9 in) and a wingspan of up to 38 cm (15 in), the purple martin is the largest amongst the around 90 species in the family Hirundinidae.

Measurement ranges:

- Length: 7.5–7.9 in (19–20 cm)
- Weight: 1.6–2.1 oz (45–60 g)
- Wingspan: 15.3–16.1 in (39–41 cm)

Purple martins are sexually dimorphic. Adult males are entirely black with a glossy steel blue sheen, the only swallow in North America with such coloration. Adult females are dark on top with some steel blue sheen, and lighter underparts. Adults have a slightly forked tail. Both male and female purple martins exhibit delayed plumage maturation, meaning it takes them two years before they acquire full adult plumage. Subadult females look similar to adult females minus the steel blue sheen and browner on the back. Subadult males look very much like females, but solid black feathers emerge on their chests in a blotchy, random pattern as they molt to their adult plumage.

Purple martin

Purple martin

Purple martins are quite vocal. They are known to chirp, chortle, rattle, and croak. Their various calls are described as "throaty and rich" and can be rendered as tchew-wew, pew pew, choo, cher, zweet, and zwrack. The males have a gurgling and guttural courtship song, a dawn song, and even a subsong used at the end of the breeding season. Recordings of purple martin song are sold to attract martins to newly established birdhouses.

The species of this genus are very closely related, and some view the purple martin, gray-breasted martin, caribbean martin, and southern martin, as a superspecies.

== Distribution and habitat ==
Purple martins' breeding range is throughout temperate North America. Their breeding habitat is open areas across eastern North America, and also some locations on the west coast from British Columbia to Mexico. Martins make their nests in cavities, either natural or artificial. In many places, humans put up real or artificial hollow gourds, or houses for martins, especially in the east, where purple martins are almost entirely dependent on such structures. As a result, this subspecies typically breeds in colonies located in proximity to people, even within cities and towns. This makes their distribution patchy, as they are usually absent from areas where no nest sites are provided. Western birds often make use of natural cavities such as old woodpecker holes in trees or saguaro cacti. The birds migrate to the Amazon basin in winter. Their winter range extends into Ecuador but does not seem to ascend far up the Andean foothills.

There are multiple records of long-distance vagrancy for this species. The first record of this species in Europe was in Dún Laoghaire, Leinster, Ireland in 1839 or 1840. The species was recorded at least six other times in the British Isles in the 1800s, and there are more recent records from Scotland in 2004 and the Azores in 2004 and 2011. There is also a record of two birds from Stanley, Falkland Islands (Las Malvinas) in 2004, and multiple records from Alaska, including records from Saint Paul Island in the Bering Sea and Fairbanks.

=== Migration ===
Wintering in Brazil, Bolivia, and parts of Peru, purple martins migrate to North America in the spring to breed. Spring migration is somewhat staggered, with arrivals in southern areas such as Florida and Texas in January, but showing up in the northern United States in April and in Canada as late as May.

The arrival date to the breeding grounds tends to correlate directly with age. It is assumed that the older birds arrive on the breeding grounds first to obtain better nesting sites. Older males typically migrate first and leave the overwintering sites in late December or early January, followed by older females. Younger birds (first yearlings) typically arrive at the breeding grounds up to two months later.

Fall migration is also staggered, as birds head south when the breeding season is over. Some birds leave as early as July and others stay as late as October. Martins generally migrate over land, through Mexico and Central America. When not breeding, martins form large flocks and roost together in great numbers. This behavior begins just prior to the southern migration and continues on the wintering grounds.

These flocks can be so large that when they take off from these roosts to forage, the activity is detected on Doppler weather radar as rings. Referred to as roost rings, they start small and then get larger until the birds have spread out and the ring disappears.

== Behaviour and ecology ==
=== Breeding ===
in the Pantanal, Brazil

Males arrive in breeding sites before females and establish their territory. A territory can consist of several potential nest sites. After forming a pair, both the male and female inspect available nest sites. This process is complicated by the fact that artificial nest sites could be houses with many rooms, clustered gourds, or single gourds. The nest is made inside the cavity of such artificial structures and retains a somewhat flat appearance. The nest is a structure of primarily three levels: the first level acts as a foundation and is usually made up of twigs, mud, small pebbles, and in at least a few reported cases, small river mollusk shells were used; the second level of the nest is made up of grasses, finer smaller twigs; the third level of construction composing the nest is a small compression usually lined with fresh green leaves where the eggs are laid.

Purple martins are generally known to raise only a single brood. The average clutch size is four to six eggs per nest. Females lay one egg a day and incubation begins when the penultimate (second to last) egg is laid. Incubation lasts 15–16 days and the female is the main incubator, with some help from the male. Hatching occurs over the course of two to three days. Fledging, when the young leave the nest, occurs between 26 and 32 days after hatch day. Fledglings will continue to receive care from both parents for up to a month after fledging.

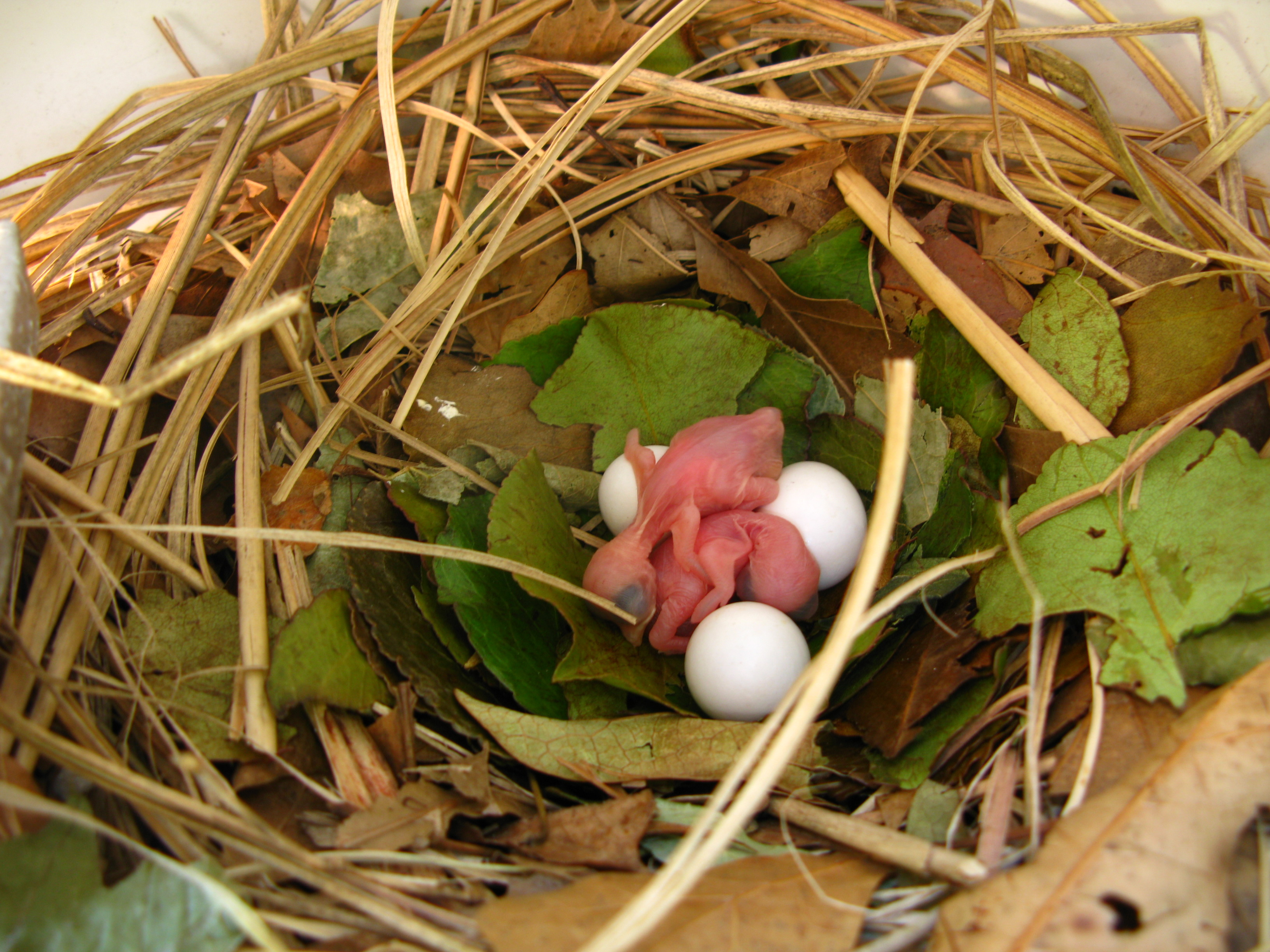
Eggs and small chicks in a nest box in Oklahoma

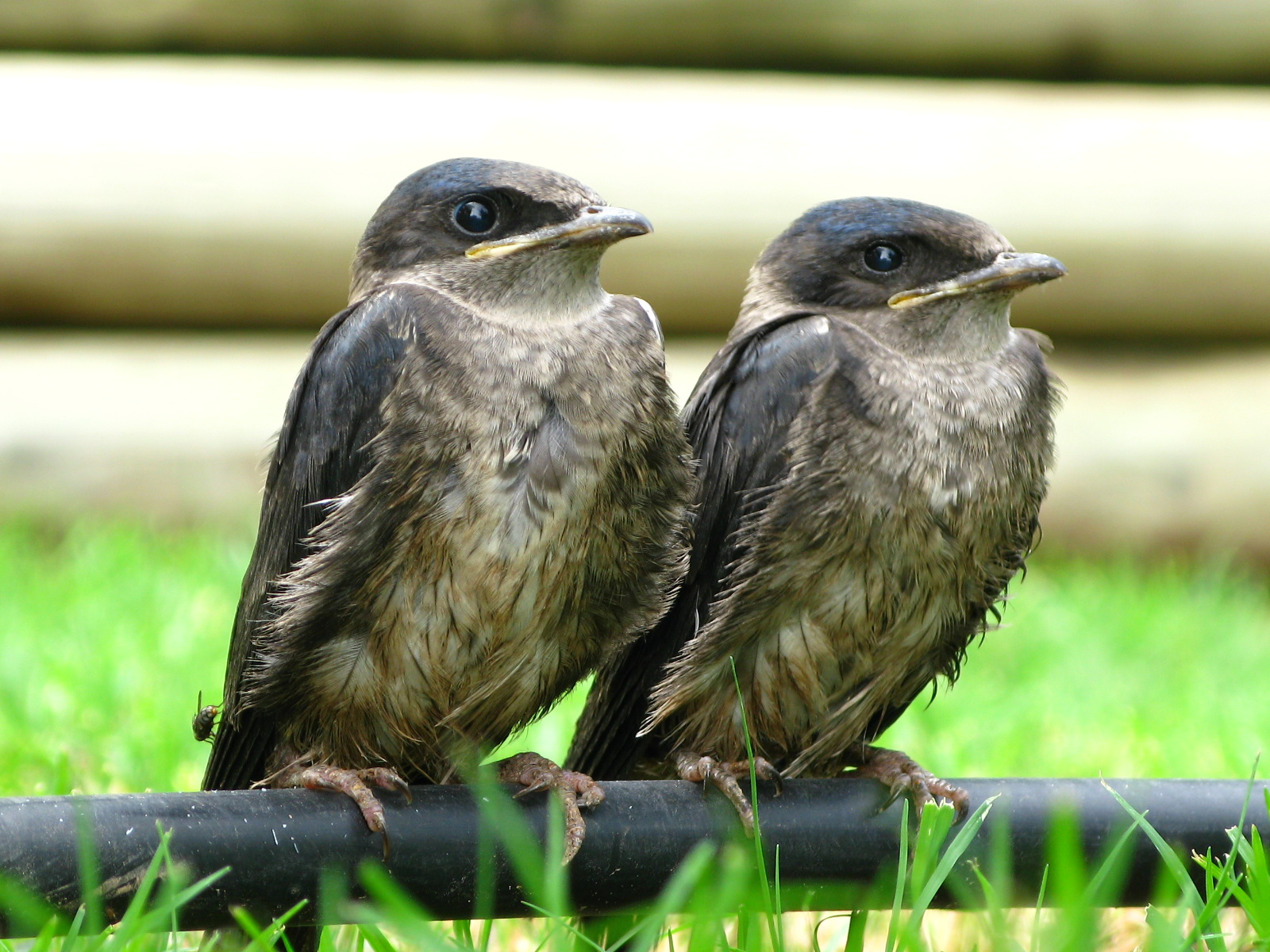
Fledglings

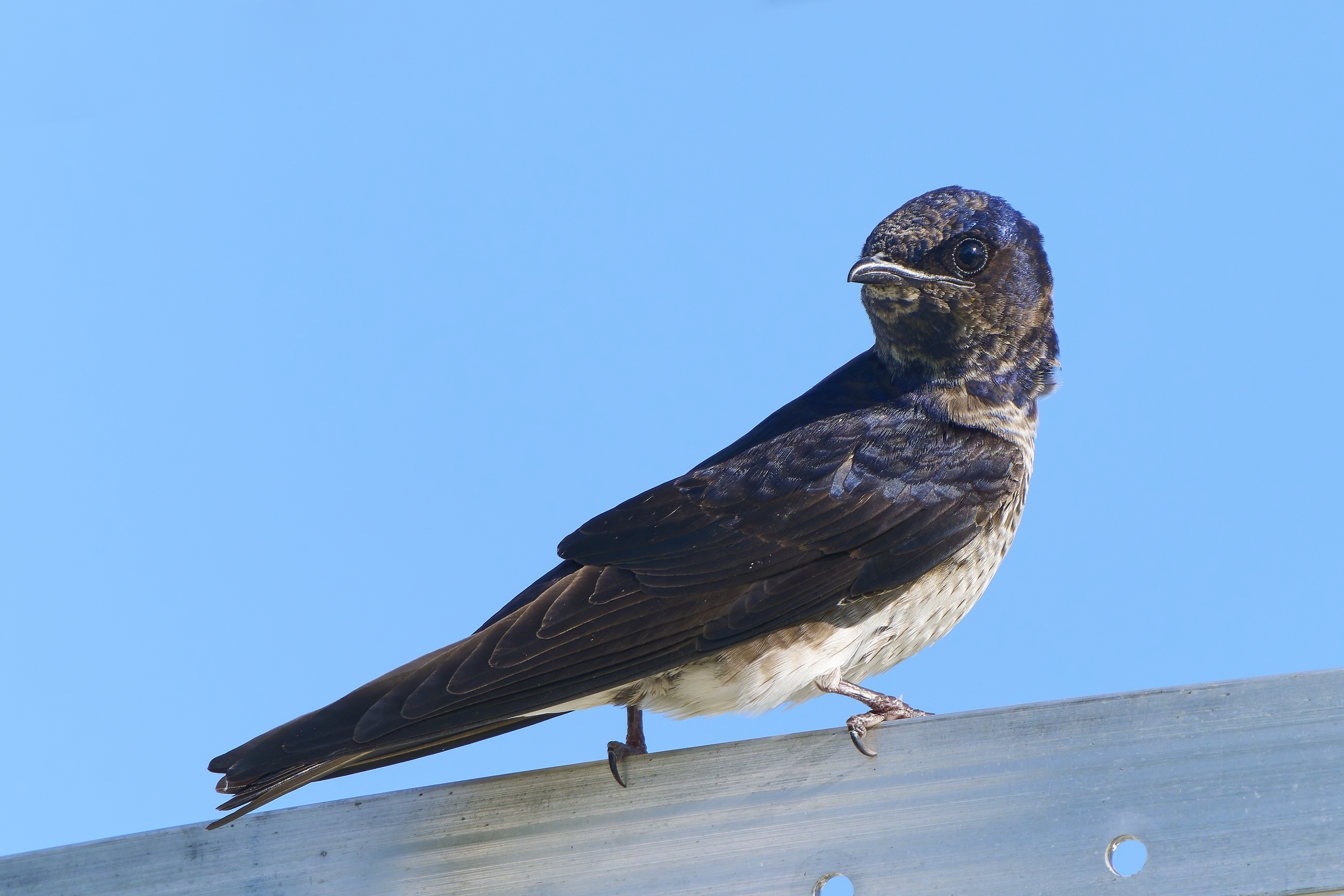
Sub-adult male. Note patches of purple/blue feathers developing at the throat and nape

=== Food and feeding ===
Purple martins are insectivores, primarily feed by hawking, a strategy of catching insects in the air during flight. The birds are agile hunters and eat a variety of winged insects. Rarely, they will come to the ground to eat insects. They usually fly relatively high, so, contrary to popular opinion, mosquitoes do not form a large part of their diet. Research published in 2015, however, does indicate that the purple martin feeds on invasive fire ants (Solenopsis invicta) and that they may make up a significant portion of their diet.

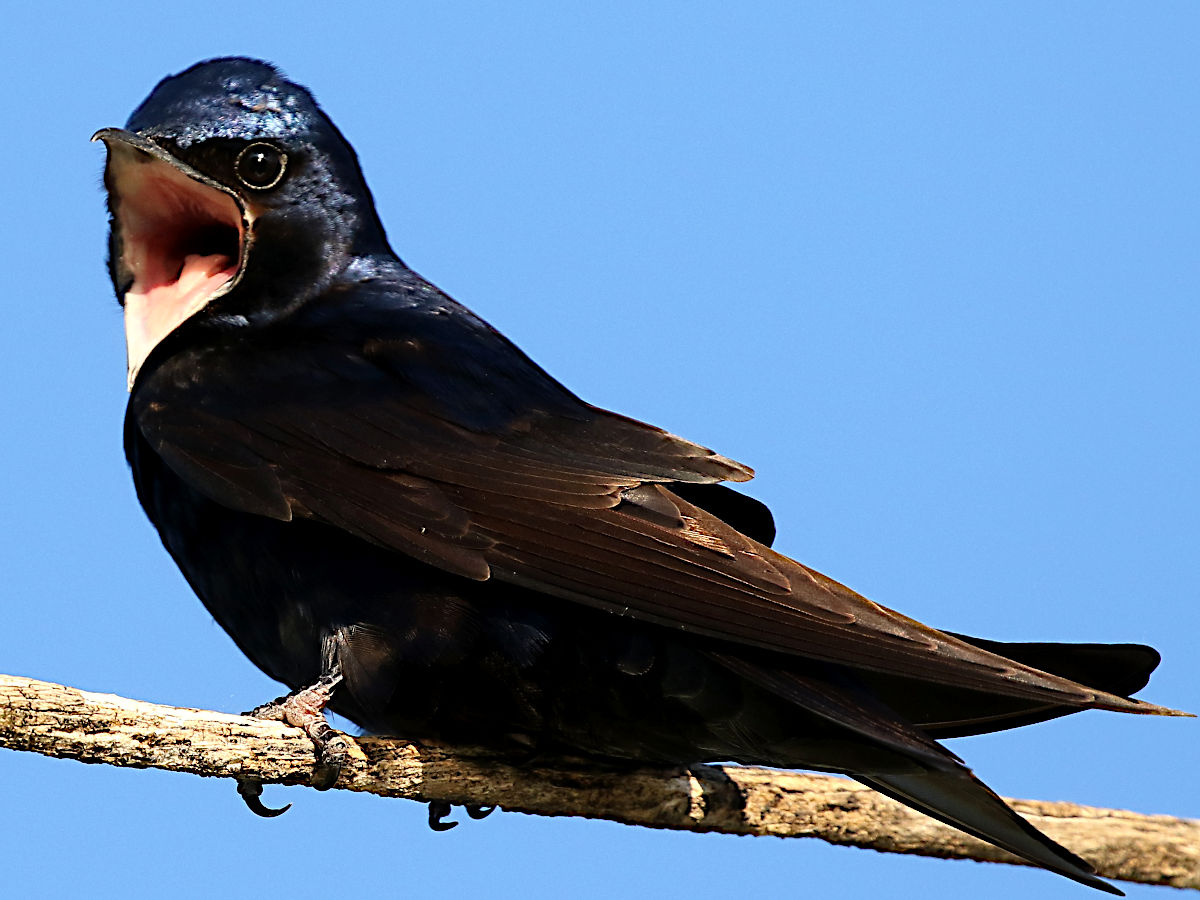
Male chirping

== Relationship with humans ==
Purple martins (nominate form P. s. subis) are considered synanthropic, meaning they have developed an association with humans over time and benefit from living in close proximity to them. Through years of generational imprinting and nesting the eastern species has made a complete transition from nesting in the wild to relying on human-provided nesting sites. Initially difficult to get a colony started, once established, the colony will persist as long as nesting sites are available. Martins have a very strong "site tenacity" and if they are successful in raising a brood, will often return to the same site to nest year after year.

The human-avian relationship was in place even before the population crash in the 20th century; Cherokee were known to have hollowed out gourds and hung them on wooden snags and posts in the pre-colonial era. They erected them so that the adult birds would build nests and then feed thousands of insects to their young each day that would otherwise be eating their crops. In 1808, Chickasaws and Choctaws were observed hanging gourds for martins on stripped saplings near their cabins, as African Americans were doing likewise on long canes on the banks of the Mississippi.

Continual maintenance and protection is required, as European starlings and house sparrows compete with martins as cavity-nesters, and will fight with martins over nest sites. Thus, unmonitored purple martin houses are often overtaken by more aggressive, non-native species. Purple martin proponents are motivated by the concern that the purple martin would likely vanish from eastern North America were it not for this assistance.

== Conservation status ==
Purple martins suffered a severe population crash in the 20th century widely linked to the release and spread of European starlings in North America. European starlings and house sparrows compete with martins for nest cavities. Where purple martins once gathered in the thousands, by the 1980s they had all but disappeared.

Though classified as being of least concern by the IUCN, purple martins are experiencing a unique threat to their long-term survival. Nearly all eastern members of the species exclusively nest in artificial gourds and 'condo' units provided by human 'landlords', and this practice has been experiencing a steady decline. One study found that nearly 90% of landlords were 50 years of age or older and that younger generations were not exhibiting the same enthusiasm nor possessing the resources to provide martin housing.

Adults around gourds and nest boxes in a garden in Tulsa, Oklahoma, United States

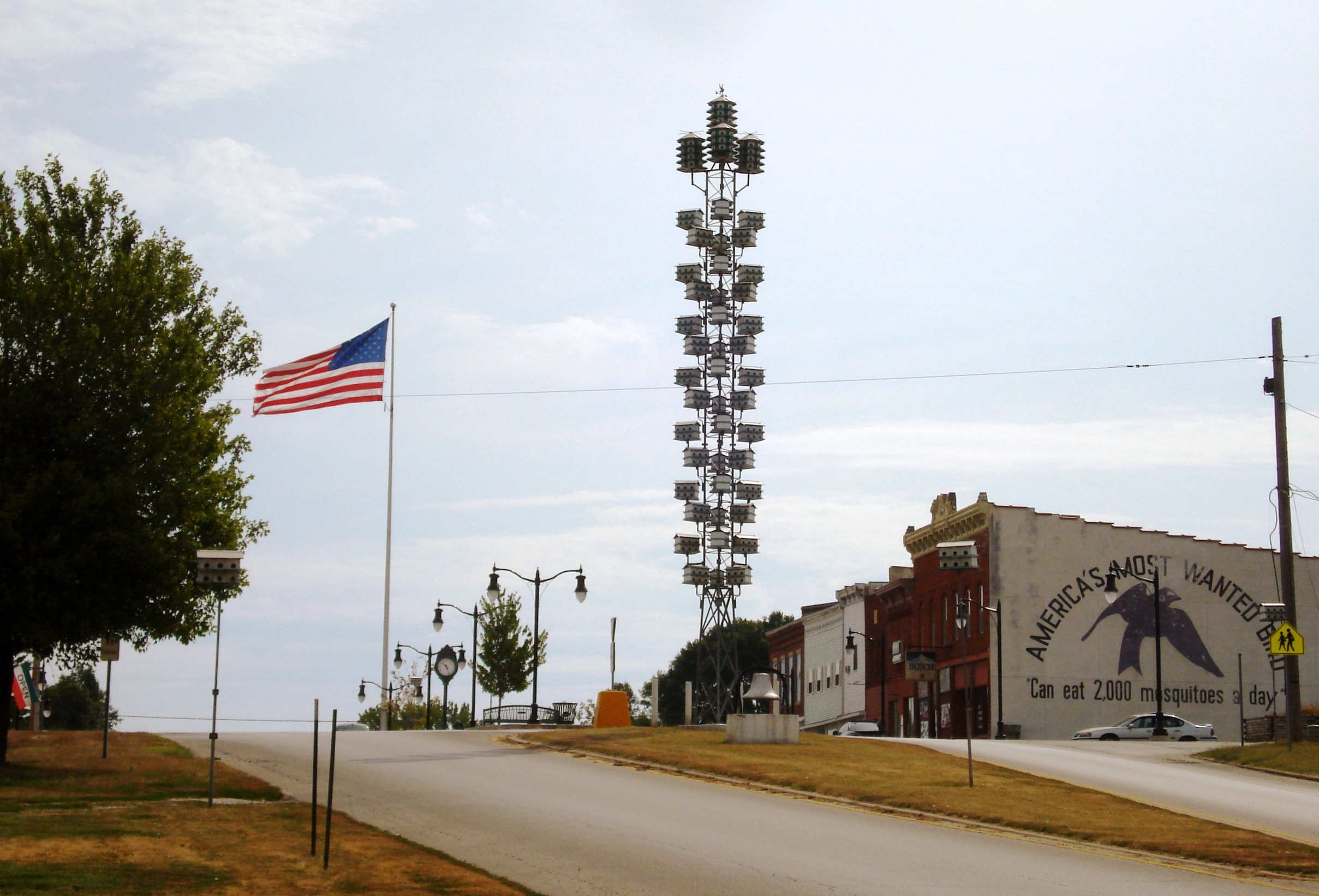
Nest boxes in Griggsville, Illinois

== Sources ==
- American Ornithologists' Union (AOU) (2000). Forty-second supplement to the American Ornithologists' Union Check-list of North American Birds. Auk 117 (3): 847–858. doi:10.1642/0004-8038(2000)117[0847:FSSTTA]2.0.CO;2
- Cisneros-Heredia, Diego F. (2006). "Información sobre la distribución de algunas especies de aves de Ecuador". ["Information on the distribution of some species of birds of Ecuador"]. Boletín de la Sociedad Antioqueña de Ornitología 16 (1): 7–16. [Spanish with English abstract]
- Peterson, Roger Tory (1980). A Completely New Guide to All the Birds of Eastern and Central North America (4th ed.). Houghton Mifflin, Boston. ISBN 99975-1-436-X.
