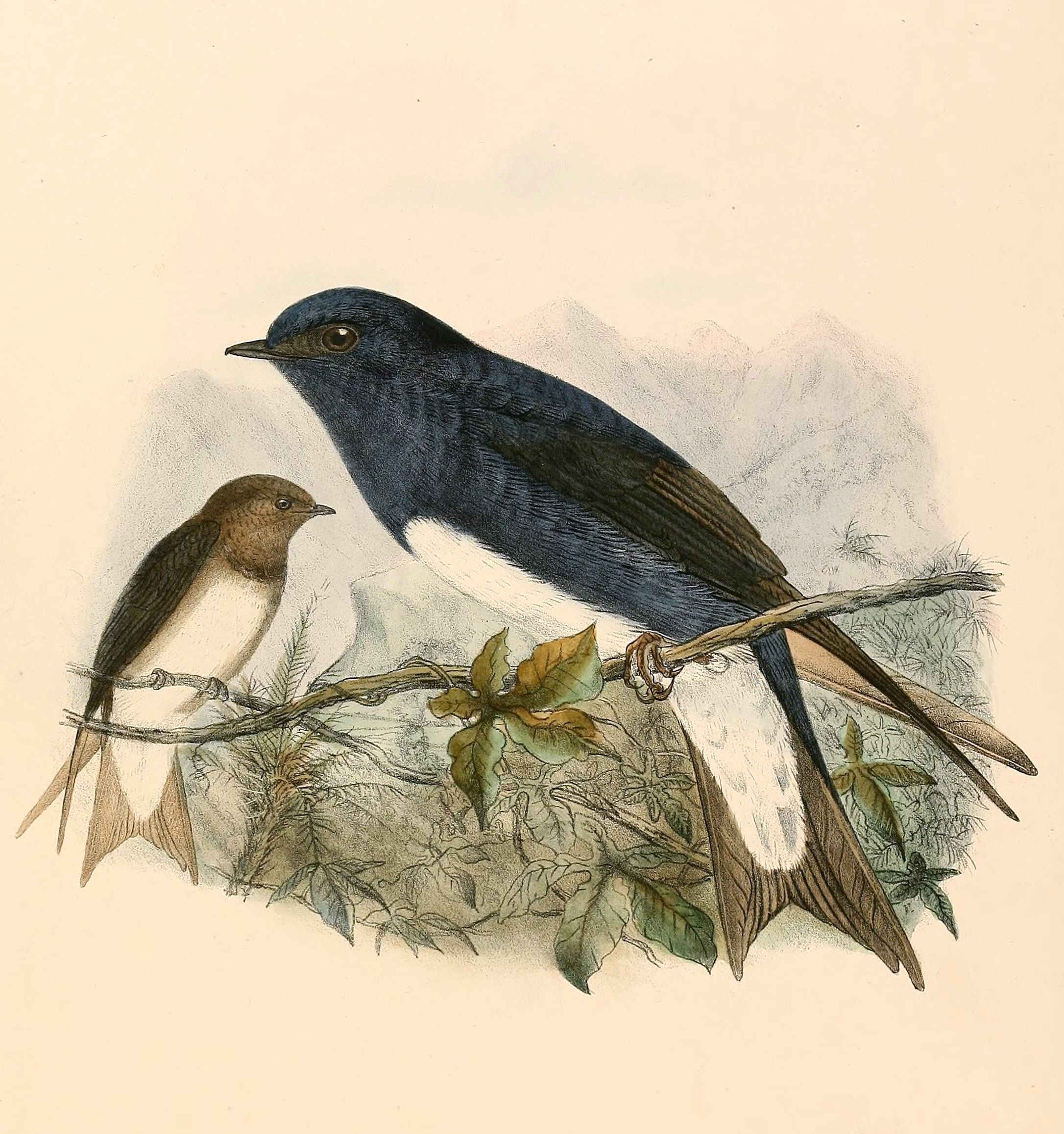
- Illustration by R. B. Sharpe (1894)

Conservation status
- Least Concern (IUCN 3.1)

Scientific classification
- Kingdom: Animalia
- Phylum: Chordata
- Class: Aves
- Order: Passeriformes
- Family: Hirundinidae
- Genus: Progne
- Species: P. dominicensis

Binomial name
- Progne dominicensis (Gmelin, JF, 1789)

= Caribbean martin =

Species of swallow

The Caribbean martin or white-bellied martin (Progne dominicensis) is a large swallow.

It has at various times been considered alternatively as a race of the purple martin, Progne subis.

== Taxonomy ==
In 1760 the French zoologist Mathurin Jacques Brisson included a description of the Caribbean martin in the second volume of his Ornithologie based on a specimen collected in the French colony of Saint-Domingue on the island of Hispaniola. He used the French name L'hirondelle de S. Dominigue and the Latin name Hirundo Dominicensis. Although Brisson coined Latin names, these do not conform to the binomial system and are not recognised by the International Commission on Zoological Nomenclature. The Caribbean martin was subsequently described by the French polymath, the Comte de Buffon, in 1779 and by the English ornithologist John Latham in 1783. Latham used the English name "St Dominico swallow" but neither Buffon nor Latham introduced a scientific name.

The German naturalist Johann Friedrich Gmelin included the Caribbean martin when he revised and expanded Carl Linnaeus's Systema Naturae in 1789. He placed it with the swallows in the genus Hirundo and coined the binomial name Hirundo dominicensis. The specific epithet dominicensis is from Santo Domingo. The Caribbean martin is now one of nine species placed in the genus Progne that was introduced in 1826 by the German zoologist Friedrich Boie. The species is monotypic: no subspecies are recognised.

== Description ==
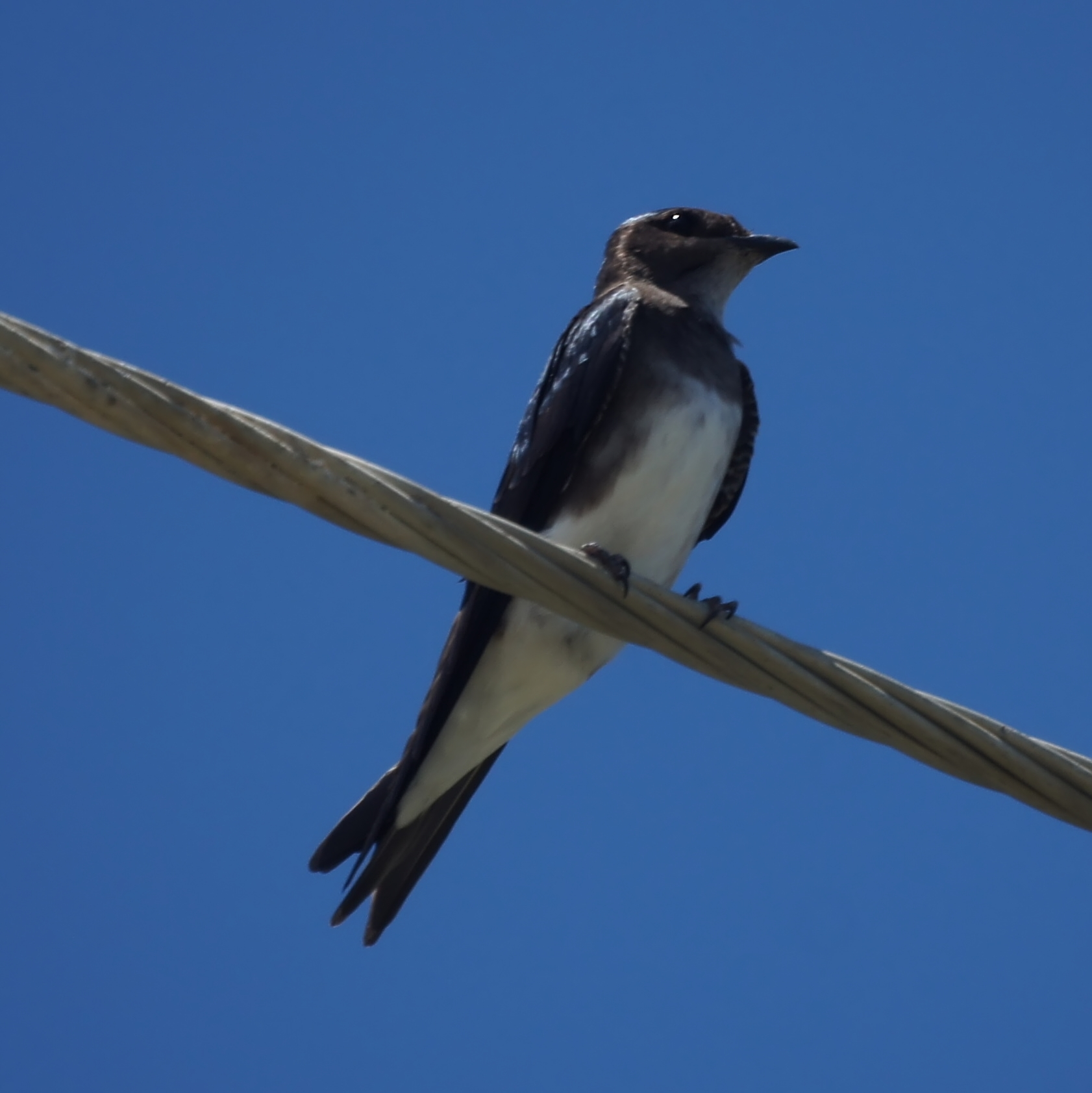
In Tobago

Adult Caribbean martins are 18.5 cm in length, with a forked tail and relatively broad wings, and weigh 40 g. Adult males are a glossy blue-black with contrasting white lower underparts. Females and juveniles are duller than the male, with grey-brown breast and flanks and white lower underparts.

== Distribution ==
It breeds throughout the Caribbean, except on Cuba and Isla de la Juventud, where it is replaced by the related Cuban martin (P. cryptoleuca). It is closely related to the aforementioned species, as well as the Sinaloa martin (P. sinaloae) to which it used to be considered conspecific. There are sight records from mainland Central and South America, and most birds appear to migrate to the South American mainland. A single bird was recorded in Key West, Florida, on May 9, 1895 (AOU 2000).

== Behaviour ==
The Caribbean martin nests in cavities in banks and buildings, or old woodpecker holes. 3–6 eggs are laid in the lined nest, and incubated for 15 days, with another 26–27 to fledging. Just as the purple martin, this species may compete with other passerines for nesting cavities. In particular, the main foe is the house sparrow in urban areas, where they mostly use man-made structures, whereas in more rural locations Picidae holes in coconut trees are favored, and there is less competition with the sparrows.

Caribbean martins are gregarious birds which hunt for insects in flight. Their call is a gurgly chew-chew.

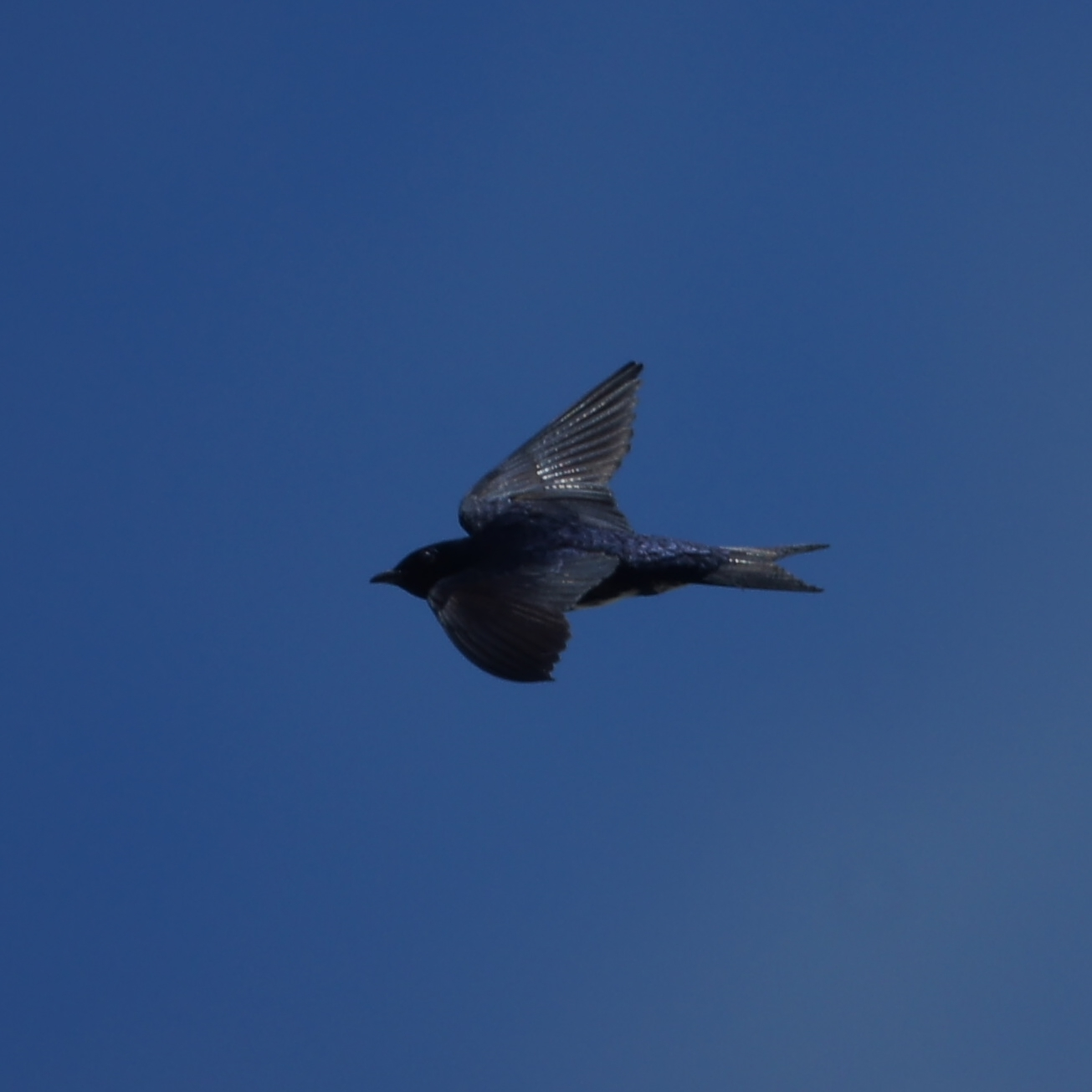
Flying in Tobago
