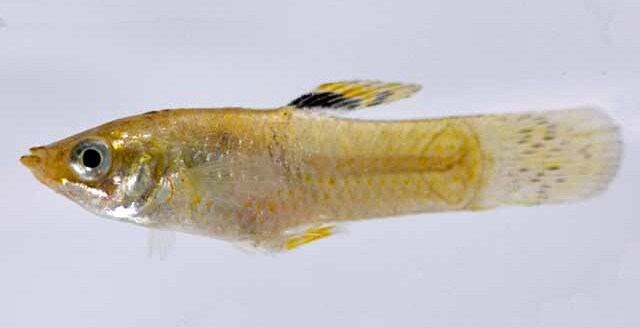
- A freshwater male

Conservation status
- Least Concern (IUCN 3.1)

Scientific classification
- Kingdom: Animalia
- Phylum: Chordata
- Class: Actinopterygii
- Division: Teleostei
- Order: Cyprinodontiformes
- Family: Poeciliidae
- Genus: Poecilia
- Species: P. vandepolli

Binomial name
- Poecilia vandepolli Van Lidth de Jeude, 1887

= Poecilia vandepolli =

Van de Poll's molly

Species of livebearer fish

Poecilia vandepolli, or Van de Poll's molly, is a poeciliid fish native to the Caribbean islands of Aruba, Bonaire, and Curaçao. It is one of the most common fish in its range, inhabiting fresh, brackish, salt, and hypersaline waters such as streams, ponds, bays, salt pans, and lagoons. For much of the twentieth century, it was regarded as a subspecies or synonym of P. sphenops, but morphological and genetic studies have confirmed its status as a distinct species. This molly is highly variable in size and color, with males ranging from 2.6 to 5.3 cm (1.0 to 2.1 in) and females from 3.2 to 9.6 cm (1.3 to 3.8 in), and coloration varying from grayish-brown to yellow or orange in any given population. Marine fish are generally larger, stronger, and more colorful than freshwater specimens. Males' ability to develop an intense orange coloration may make the species attractive to aquarists.

Forming shoals near the surface, mollies feed mainly on algae, detritus, and aquatic invertebrates, and are preyed upon by other fish and birds. Females produce live fry, giving the species an edge over killifish, with which it competes across its range. Successful reproduction depends on the availability of shelter for fry, most of which fall prey to adults. The species is drawn to freshwater habitats, which disappear in each dry season, killing freshwater populations; these habitats are recolonized from the sea when the rains return.

== Taxonomy ==
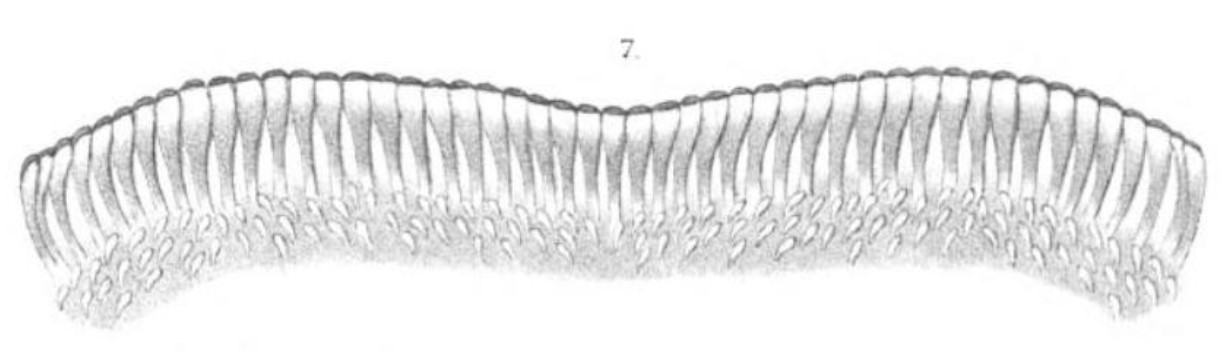
Top view of the inner teeth of P. vandepolli. Single-pointed teeth set the species apart from P. sphenops.

In 1887, Van Lidth de Jeude described a new Poecilia species, P. vandepolli, from specimens collected in a freshwater rivulet on Curaçao. He simultaneously described a subspecies from Aruba, P. vandepolli arubensis, on the basis of a slight difference in the proportional relationship between overall body length and the depth of the caudal peduncle (tail stalk). Metzelaar argued that the observed distinction did not warrant taxonomic separation, as it could be explained by normal variation within the species, compounded by the limited number of specimens available for study, and later authors have not recognized the subspecies.

In 1926, Hubbs reduced P. vandepolli to a subspecies of P. sphenops. Rosen and Bailey went further in 1963, questioning the validity of this and other short-fin molly species and placing them in synonymy with P. sphenops. In 1971, Schultz and Miller restored P. butleri to species rank on the grounds of partial reproductive and geographic isolation. Two years later, Menzel and Darnell resurrected P. mexicana from synonymy of P. sphenops, noting that it differs from P. sphenops in ways similar to P. butleri. The key difference is dental: P. butleri and P. mexicana have inner jaw teeth with a single point (unicuspid), whereas P. sphenops has inner jaw teeth with three points (tricuspid). P. vandepolli also has single-pointed teeth, but it diverges from all other Poecilia in additional traits, including the morphology of the gonopodium (male reproductive appendage), coloration patterns, body measurements, and scale counts. On this basis, and in the absence of intergrades (intermediate forms), Poeser reinstated P. vandepolli as a distinct species in 1992.

- Mollienesia
  - - - - - - P. mexicana
          - - - P. gillii
              - P. orri
            - - P. butleri
        - - - - - P. vandepolli
                - P. wandae
              - - P. koperi
            - - P. cf. gillii
      - - P. hondurensis
    - - - - - P. catemaconis
            - P. sphenops
          - - P. cf. sphenops
  - - P. kykesis
    - P. latipinna

Phylogenetic relationships of P. vandepolli, based on the concatenated sequences of mitochondrial and nuclear DNA

Although he treated it as a subspecies of the Central American P. sphenops, Hubbs observed that P. vandepolli resembles the South American P. vivipara in gonopodial structure, body size, fin placement, general form, and coloration. Poeser found this indicative of a common ancestry between P. vandepolli and P. vivipara; he objected to Miller's 1975 resurrection of Mollienesia as a subgenus of Poecilia because it separated P. vandepolli from P. vivipara.

A genetic analysis in 2016 confirmed that P. vandepolli is a distinct species and supported its placement among the mollies (Mollienesia). It identified P. wandae as the sister species of P. vandepolli; the two form a clade with P. koperi and an undescribed species similar to P. gillii. P. vandepolli is the youngest member of this group. Its ancestral form diverged approximately 150,000 years ago when the sea levels were lower and the Lesser Antilles islands, which the species inhabits today, were connected to mainland Venezuela. The connection likely allowed the most recent common ancestor of P. vandepolli and P. wandae to populate the area, while the subsequent sea level rise led to the emergence of two distinct species. Geographically, the closest relative of P. vandepolli is the Panamian P. gillii cuneata, but the Caribbean Sea ensures reproductive isolation and no intergrades have been reported between them.

The specific epithet commemorates the Dutch entomologist Jacob R. H. Neervoort van de Poll. The species has no established common name. Proposed common names include Van de Poll's molly, orange-tail molly, and Dutch-Antillean molly. On Curaçao, it is known by the Papiamento name machuri; on Aruba, where it is also native, it is called "molly".

== Description ==
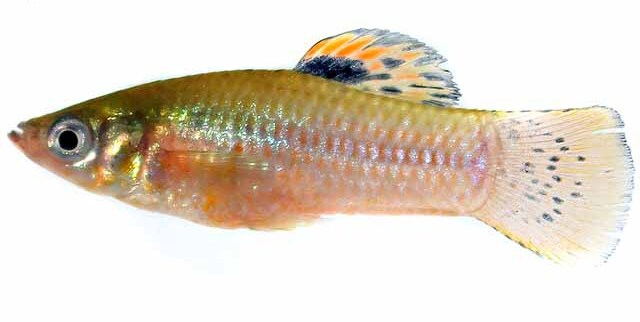
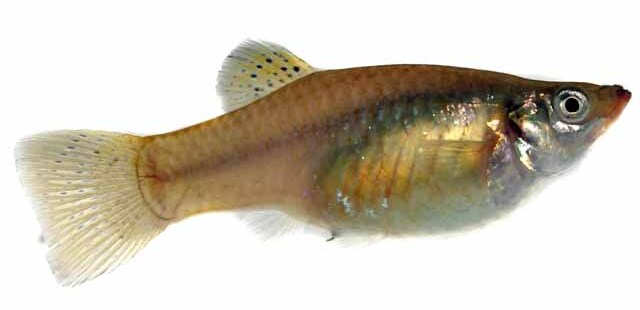
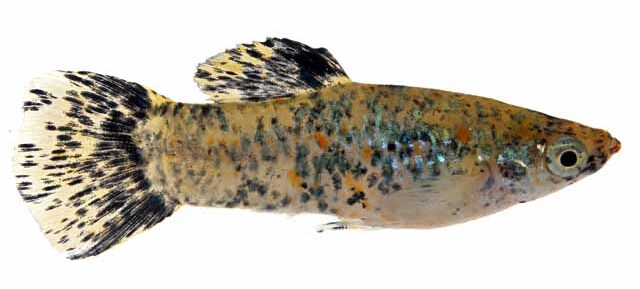
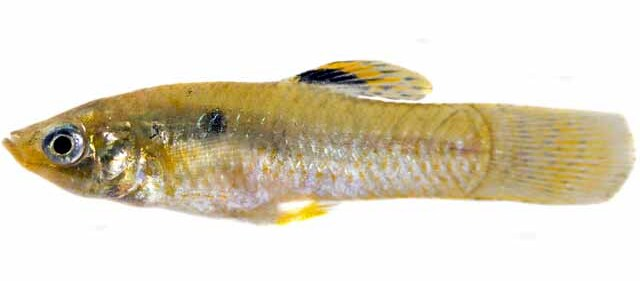
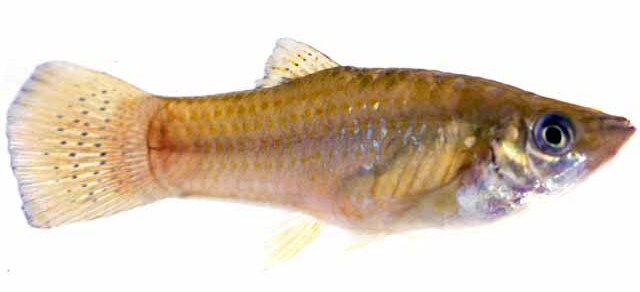
From top to bottom: a saltwater male, a saltwater female, a speckled saltwater male, a freshwater male with a humeral spot, and a female from the Spanish Lagoon

In Poecilia vandepolli, the gonopodium bears no external spines or hooks, and its fourth ray usually carries 10–11 fine serrations (tooth-like bumps) that begin on the sixth or seventh segment from the tip; in fully developed males, a small membranous swelling on the third ray partly veils these projecting serrations. The caudal fin typically has about 17 rays, the dorsal and anal fins each about 8, the ventral fin 6, and the pectoral fin about 12. Along the body, the fish usually shows 27 scales in a row running from head to tail, around 13 before the dorsal fin, about 23 encircling the mid-body, and around 16 surrounding the caudal peduncle. The species can be distinguished from P. sphenops and P. mexicana by its rearward dorsal and anal fins with fewer rays, a smooth gonopodium, and the humeral spot—a mark on the side of the body just behind the head—which appears in some specimens, more commonly in those from fresh water.

Poecilia vandepolli is highly polymorphic. Size varies considerably among populations, with males ranging in total length from 2.6 to 5.3 cm (1.0 to 2.1 in) and females from 3.2 to 9.6 cm (1.3 to 3.8 in). Regan, who treated P. vandepolli as synonymous with P. sphenops, examined specimens from the mainland and from the Leeward Antilles, finding "numerous examples to [12.0 cm] in total length from all parts of the range of [P. sphenops]".

Pigmentation is equally variable. Males and females have the same color patterns, but males are more vivid and have a larger dorsal fin. While females are generally grayish-brown, their backs may carry a faint wash of green or blue. Within a single population, males may match that subdued coloration, display yellow flanks tinged with blue, or have an orange-red dorsal fin bordered in black and an orange throat. Often, 10–12 grey vertical stripes can be seen on the trunk and tail. Speckled specimens also occur.

The physical differences between populations reflect local ecological conditions, above all salinity. Fish from fresh or hypersaline habitats are smaller, show weaker coloration, and have shorter dorsal fins than individuals living in marine conditions. A more robust caudal peduncle allows saltwater specimens to withstand the challenges of strong waves and tidal currents. In contrast to their pale freshwater conspecifics, marine fish exhibit more orange pigmentation across their bodies, especially in their dorsal and caudal fins, as well as darker and more numerous spots in the caudal fin. Brackish water specimens resemble freshwater fish in size and body shape, but differ in that males never have a humeral spot. Aside from those with humeral spots, freshwater populations include males with a broad black band at the base of the dorsal fin. Aruban specimens more commonly exhibit a minor gonopodial variant: in some fully pigmented adult males of all color types, one gonopodial ray bears a small hook, a feature that likely represents a late maturation stage.

== Distribution and habitats ==
=== Range ===
P. vandepolli (yellow) is closely related to P. koperi (blue) and P. wandae (brown) from the mainland.

Poecilia vandepolli is native to three islands of the Leeward Antilles: Aruba, Bonaire, and Curaçao. The species has not been recorded on other Leeward Antilles islands, but it is found in the freshwater habitats of Saint Martin in the Antillean Windward Islands, where it was probably introduced by Dutch settlers. The ecological consequences of its establishment on Saint Martin have not been determined.

Populations from mainland Venezuela previously attributed to Poecilia vandepolli, including those in the Lake Maracaibo river estuary and "thousands of individuals" in a drainage flowing through the city of Maracaibo, are now identified as P. koperi.

=== Habitat and environment ===
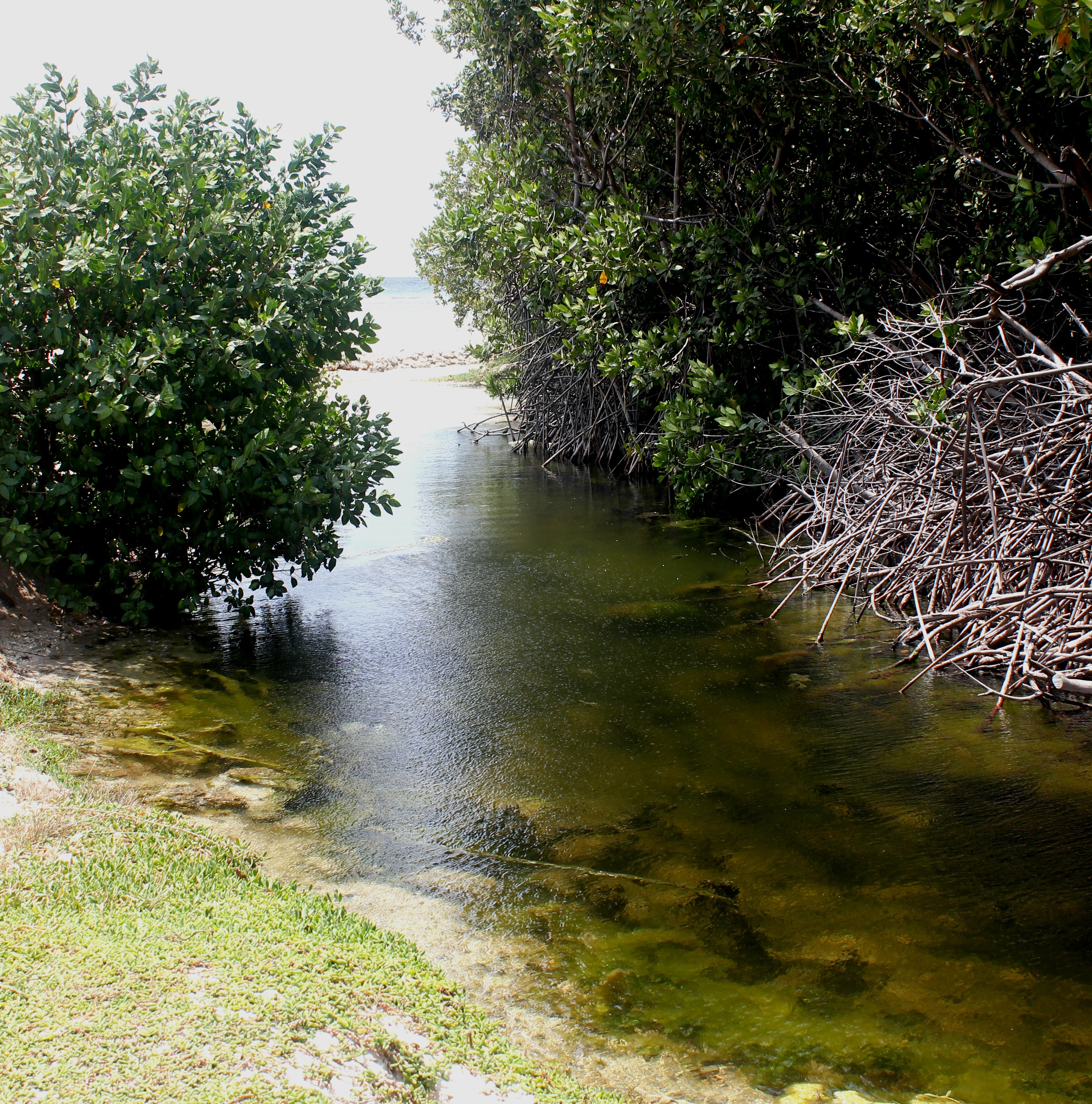
Brackish stream in Aruba inhabited by P. vandepolli. The species is especially common among mangroves.

Poecilia vandepolli is a euryhaline species: it inhabits freshwater, brackish, saltwater (c. 35‰), and hypersaline coastal habitats. It is one of the most common fish in the coastal habitats across the Lesser Antilles and is found in nearly all freshwater localities. On Aruba, it is especially abundant in rivulets and ponds, the Spanish Lagoon, and the salt evaporation ponds (salinas) in the northwestern part of the island. It is one of only five native species inhabiting the fresh waters of Aruba, the others including the American eel and the mountain mullet, and is by far the most abundant and dominant along with the invasive Mozambique tilapia. Most of the fresh and brackish ponds on the island are muddy and cloudy. On Curaçao, mollies abound in temporary freshwater pools. They frequently occur in shallow areas of inner bays and lagoons and are also present in all salinas connected to the sea, as well as in the single landlocked salina at Cas Abou. Along the shoreline of Bonaire, mollies are common in Lac and Lagun bays. In the bay of Slagbaai, they are numerous wherever salinity levels are below 90‰. They are nearly absent on the island itself, where freshwater habitats tend to stay isolated from the sea.

Calm lagoons and secluded parts of bays harbor abundant populations of mollies; their numbers are particularly high in areas where mangroves grow. Habitats are between 10 and 200 cm deep; the species cannot survive if water dries up. Waters containing green filamentous algae are preferred regardless of depth. In deeper water, the fish remain near the surface, forming relatively small shoals, typically of a few dozen individuals. Despite habitat pressures across the islands—including invasive species, altered water flow, and tourism-related shoreline development—the species has not experienced major overall habitat degradation, and even on heavily developed Aruba, where many sites have been lost, the survival of mollies does not appear to be under threat.

P. vandepolli inhabits waters with salinities up to about 80‰, and occasionally as high as 135‰, but it requires access to lower-salinity areas for refuge. It withstands a thermal range of 16–36 °C (61–97 °F), although neither temperature nor salinity varies significantly in most habitats. Some lagoons are brackish in the rainy season and become supersaline in the dry season; others remain supersaline for most of the year. In pools and lagoons, the temperature is 25–26 °C (77–79 °F) in the colder part of the year and 27–31 °C (81–88 °F) in the warmer months. Hypersaline environments are an exception, as evaporation increases salinity and rainfall decreases it. Rainwater can also accumulate as a surface layer that traps heat in the underlying hypersaline water, pushing temperatures to lethal heights.

=== Population patterns ===
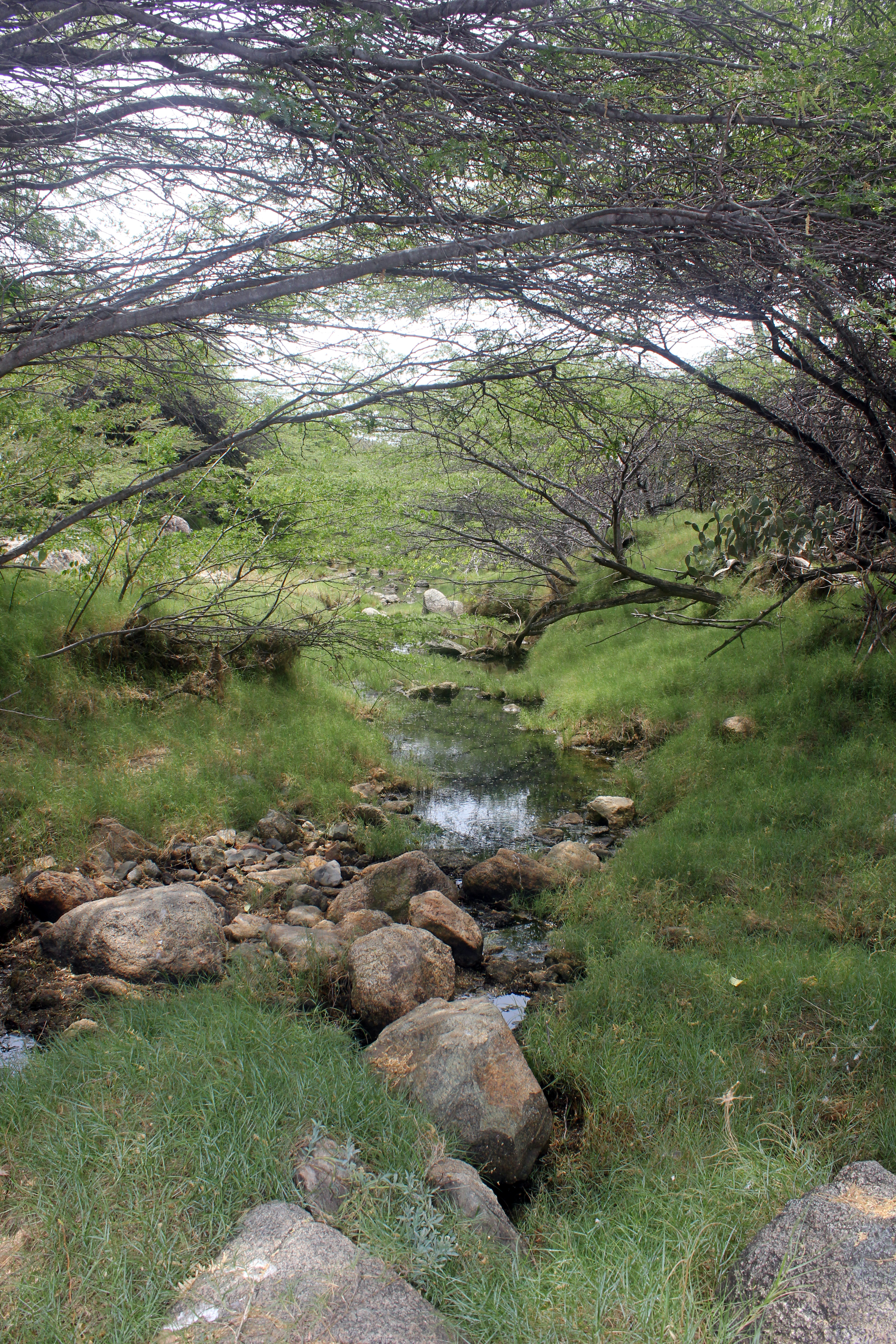
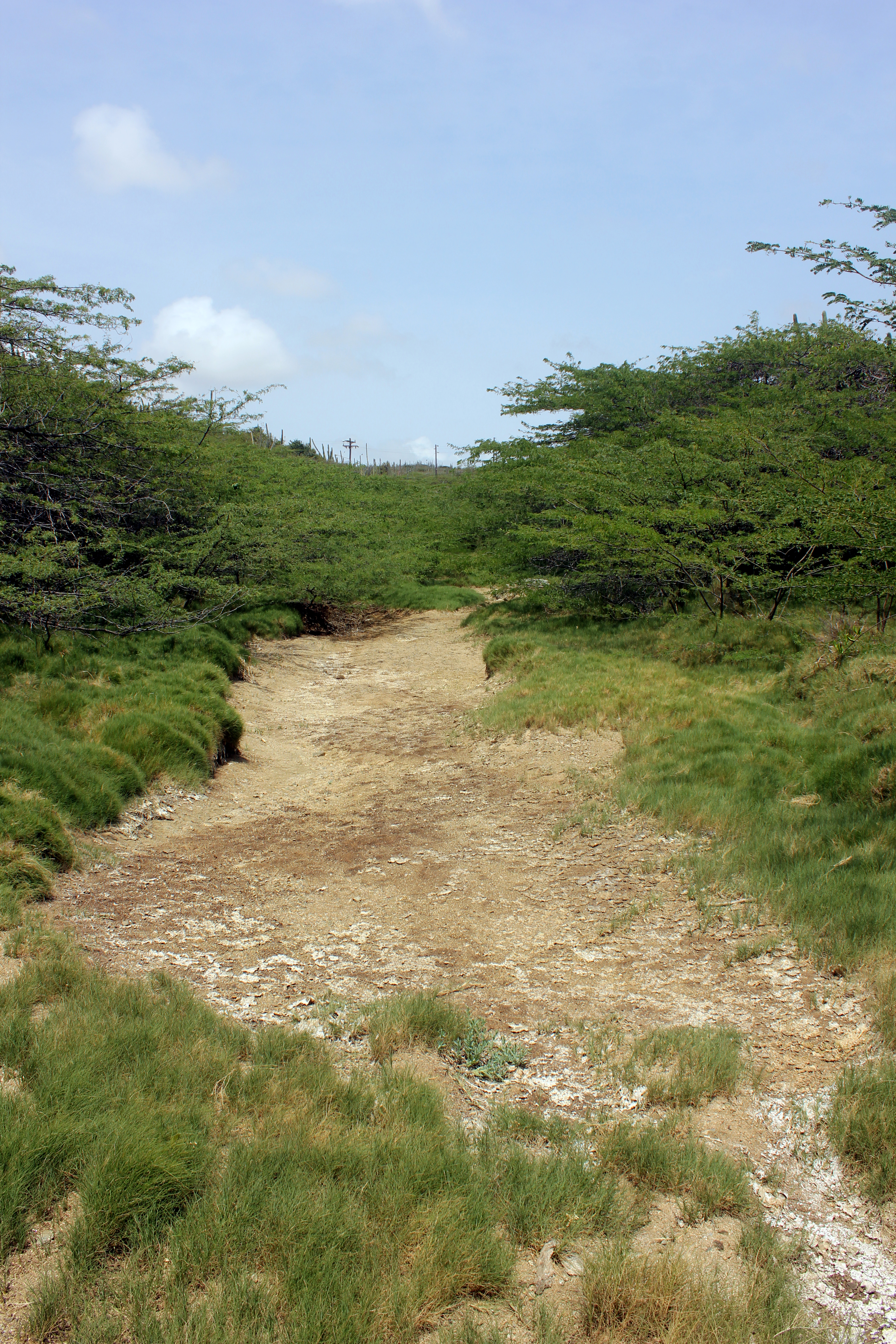
An inland stream inhabited in the wet season (left) and the same stream in the dry season (right), Aruba

The population of Poecilia vandepolli in saltwater habitats is small, likely due to high predation, but crucial because of its stability. Most of the freshwater pools and all the ephemeral streams inhabited by mollies vanish during the dry season, essentially purging the islands of freshwater animals. When the rains return and trigger floods, surface runoff laden with terrestrial organic compounds spurs mollies from the sea to swim frantically against the current to colonize the reemergent freshwater systems; there they reproduce rapidly. The attraction to inland water, regardless of its salinity, has been demonstrated in laboratory tests.

There is a slight genetic difference between Aruban and Curaçaoan molly populations, but no genetic subdivision within each island, reflecting annual recolonization from the sea. An exception is Aruba's Fontijn spring, a perennial freshwater source on the wave-battered north coast. Isolated by high-energy coastal conditions, Fontijn mollies are as genetically distinct from other Aruban populations as Aruban populations are from those in Curaçao.

== Ecology ==
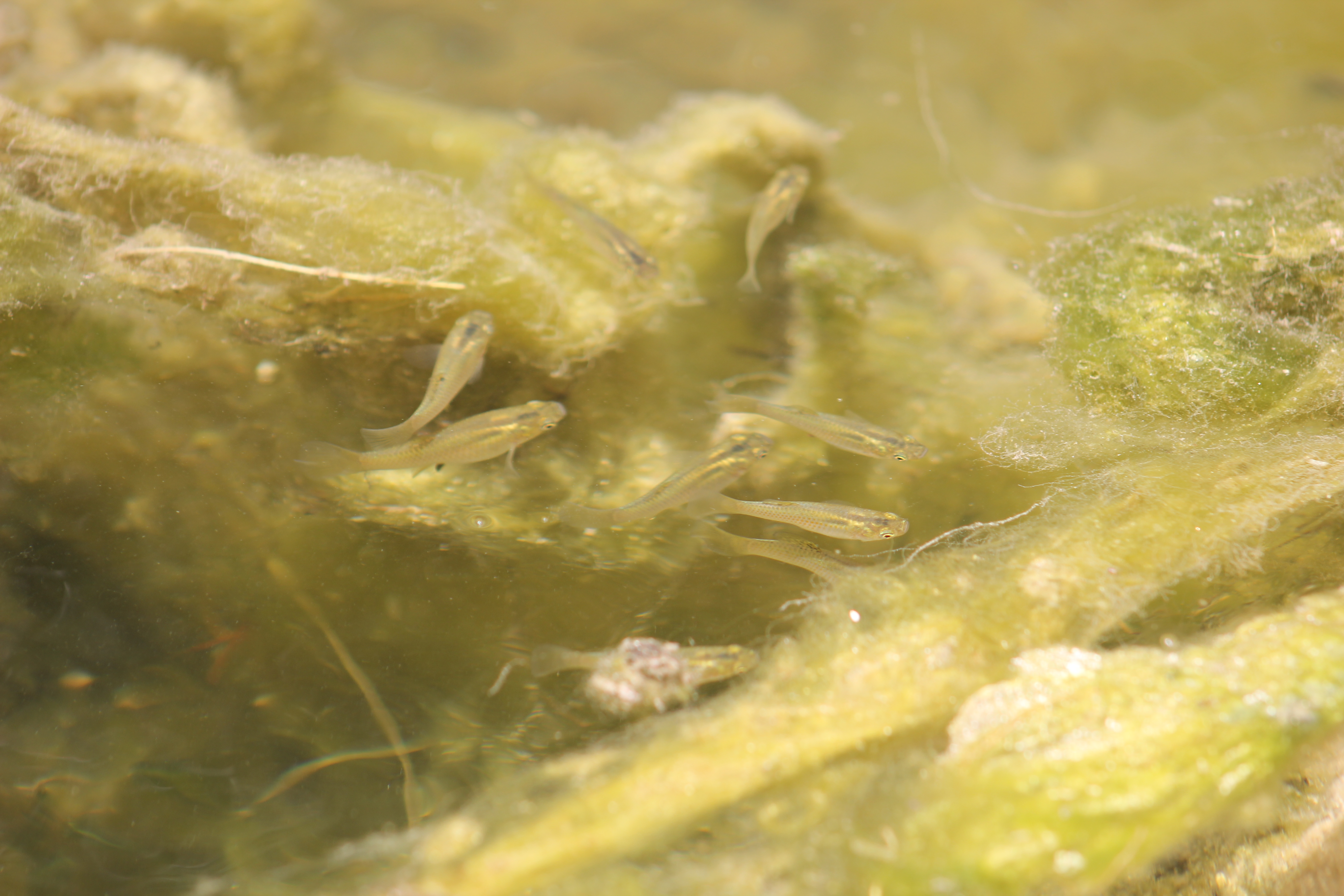
Van de Poll's mollies thrive in algae-rich waters, grazing constantly on submerged surfaces.

Poecilia vandepolli is omnivorous. Its diet is largely composed of organisms growing on submerged surfaces, which the fish constantly scrape and nibble off; stomach contents have been found to include detritus, algae (Cyanophyceae and Chlorophyceae), protozoans, fish eggs, fly larvae (Ephydra), and other mostly stationary organisms. Their preferred planktonic prey is Artemia salina, which they rapidly eradicate from their environment, but they also capture copepods, mysids, and small fish. Insects, such as flies and ants, are consumed only sporadically. When food becomes scarce, adults cannibalize fry.

The molly's major competitors are two killifish species, Kryptolebias marmoratus and the pupfish Cyprinodon dearborni. These species may only coexist if their habitat has a connection to the sea; if the habitat is cut off from the sea, only one species remains as food dwindles. The pupfish–which shares the molly's salinity tolerance and dietary habits–is accordingly nearly absent on Aruba, where the molly is ubiquitous; but on Bonaire, the pupfish is abundant while the molly is known from only one freshwater locality. The one recorded exception is the Slagbaai Bay, where the coexistence of both P. vandepolli and C. dearborni in a landlocked body of water is made possible by a constant influx of Artemia from the saltier areas. P. vandepolli preys on eggs and juveniles of both killifish. Experiments showed that predation by mollies prevents killifish from successfully reproducing, particularly where shelter is lacking or space is limited, concurring with observations in nature.

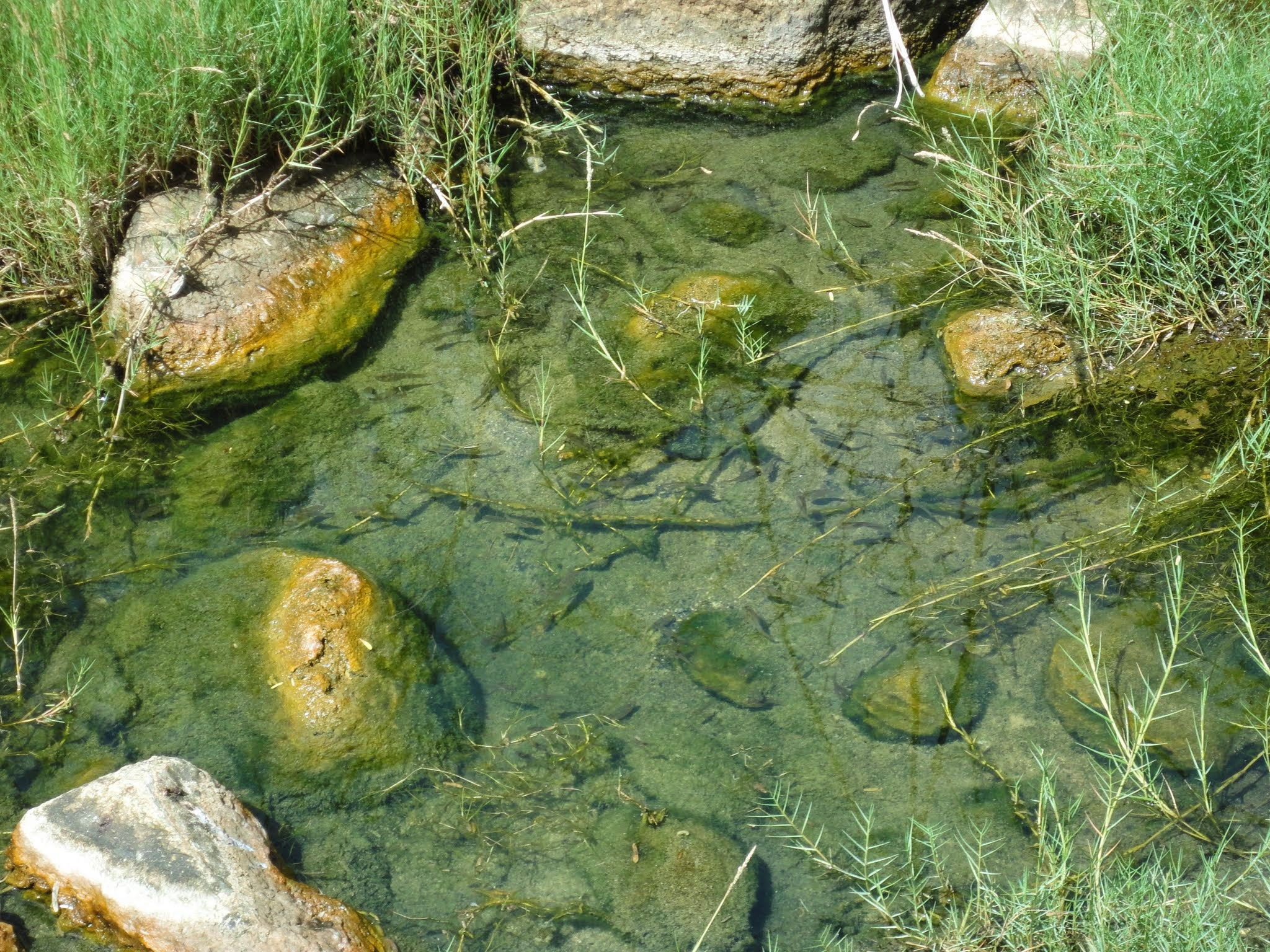
P. vandepolli readily establishes itself in temporary pools, only to die off when the water disappears.

In small, landlocked waters, P. vandepolli populations may reach high densities. This is limited by the availability of food: most offspring starve or fall prey to adults. In the sea, the molly is heavily predated on by other fish. These probably include barracudas, snappers, and groupers, which have been observed preying on C. dearborni. The molly is likely more adept than the pupfish at evading predators because it is more alert and swims faster. Mollies face few predators in freshwater and hypersaline environments, but on Curaçao they are targeted by birds and parasitized by trematodes resembling Diplostomum. Parasite attacks lead to blindness and may substantially depress isolated populations. Avian predators include pelicans, green and tricolored herons, and the olivaceous cormorant. An examination of the stomachs of tricolored herons, which pursue their prey with great speed or stalk it motionless, revealed that pupfish were captured more frequently than mollies.

Desiccation causes mass mortalities in evaporating fresh water. In 1961, a dense molly population that thrived in shallow water abundantly vegetated by Ruppia maritima at the Cas Abao saltpans was affected when salinity rose above 70‰, the plants died off, and their decay depleted oxygen; mollies clustered around small inflows of seawater, but the drop in oxygen nevertheless wiped out almost the entire population.

== Reproduction ==
An advantage Poecilia vandepolli has over its competitors is its ovoviparity–the bearing of live fry as opposed to laying eggs. Females, which reach maturity at total lengths of 2.3–5.5 cm, are up to twice as numerous as males, which mature at 2.1–3.2 cm. An observation of hundreds of mollies in a stream on Aruba revealed large males chasing females incessantly. These males displayed more orange coloring than the other males in the area. Studies of other Poecilia species, such as the guppy (P. reticulata), have shown that such increased coloration is attractive to females.

The male fertilizes the eggs in the female's oviduct by inserting his gonopodium into her genital opening. Females can store sperm within folds of the ovary wall, allowing them to produce eight or more consecutive litters after a single mating. Fertilized eggs develop for approximately 30 days before hatching. While small females of 3 cm produce about 10 fry per litter, particularly large ones of 9 cm may produce over 100. Newborn fry measure 8–9 mm. They first sink to the bottom but soon swim upward, hiding within algae, roots, and other available shelter. Adults heavily predate on fry; in the absence of shelter such as filamentous algae or similar structures at the surface, almost no fry survive their first day. Fry are no longer vulnerable to cannibalistic predation after two weeks, when they reach a length of about 13 mm.

Van de Poll's mollies grow faster in the sea than in fresh water and slowest in hypersaline environments, but individuals in all populations attain their maximum size in their first year. In the sea population, even the smallest mature fish are noticeably larger than their counterparts elsewhere, indicating that seawater P. vandepolli reach maturity at a greater size. Growth is stunted in stagnant and overcrowded waters, either because of an increase of organic wastes or food shortage.

== Fishkeeping ==
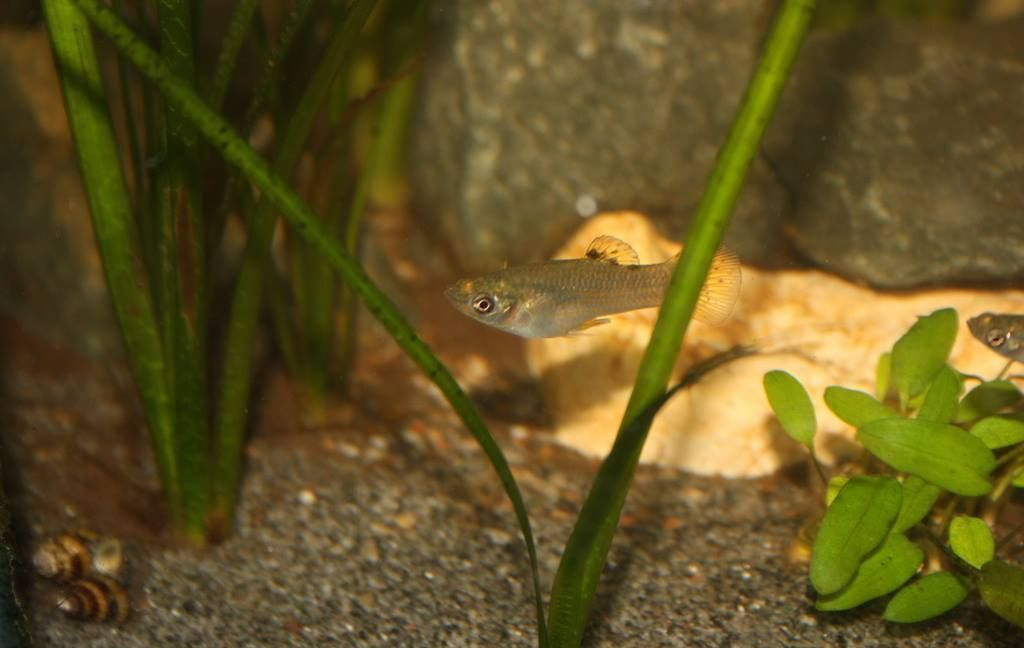
Van de Poll's mollies are easy to keep in an aquarium.

Males' ability to intensify their orange coloration after a high-carotenoid diet and the existence of highly blotched specimens might qualify P. vandepolli for ornamental fish trade. The species is easy to care for in a home aquarium and breeds readily. It demands plenty of space on account of its activity as well as warm water. A 76-litre aquarium is sufficient for about 10 individuals.
