= Poecilia koperi =

Conservation status
- Least Concern (IUCN 3.1)

Scientific classification
- Kingdom: Animalia
- Phylum: Chordata
- Class: Actinopterygii
- Order: Cyprinodontiformes
- Family: Poeciliidae
- Genus: Poecilia
- Species: P. koperi

Binomial name
- Poecilia koperi Poeser, 2003

Species of livebearer fish

Poecilia koperi is a poeciliid fish species native to Colombia and Venezuela.

Poecilia koperi has simple, single-cusped inner teeth, and the largest individuals examined measured 56.2 mm standard length for a female and 47.0 mm for a male. Within the Poecilia sphenops species complex, it differs from P. gillii cuneata by having fewer rays in the dorsal and anal fins and from other P. gillii subspecies by its gonopodium. Two well-separated color forms occur: populations east of Coro show a few horizontal rows of body spots with modestly marked fins, whereas those west of Coro, in the Maracaibo Basin, are more heavily marked, with males showing about ten vertical stripes, pigmented scale edges, and patterned caudal and dorsal fins; females share the same general pattern but with paler stripes, unspotted fins, and a blunter snout.

Poecilia koperi ranges along the northern coast of South America, from Venezuela's Araya Peninsula to eastern Colombia. It is a benthopelagic species which can survive in both fresh and brackish waters. Fred N. Poeser, who described it, named the species in honor of his friend Michel Koper. Populations of this species were previously identified as P. sphenops, P. sphenops vandepolli, P. sphenops cuneata, and P. vivipara.

Within the genus Poecilia, P. koperi belongs to the mollies, subgenus Mollienesia. It forms a clade with P. vandepolli, P. wandae, and an undescribed species provisionally called P. cf. gillii. P. koperi and P. wandae diverged slightly earlier than about 150 thousand years ago. The two species appear to be paraphyletic, meaning that their genetic lineages are not fully separated; this may reflect contemporary hybridization and genetic introgression where their ranges meet around Lake Maracaibo.

Distribution of P. boesemani (red), P. koperi (blue), P. vandepolli (yellow) and P. wandae (brown).
