= Muizenberg (Curaçao) =

Wetland on Curaçao in the Dutch Caribbean

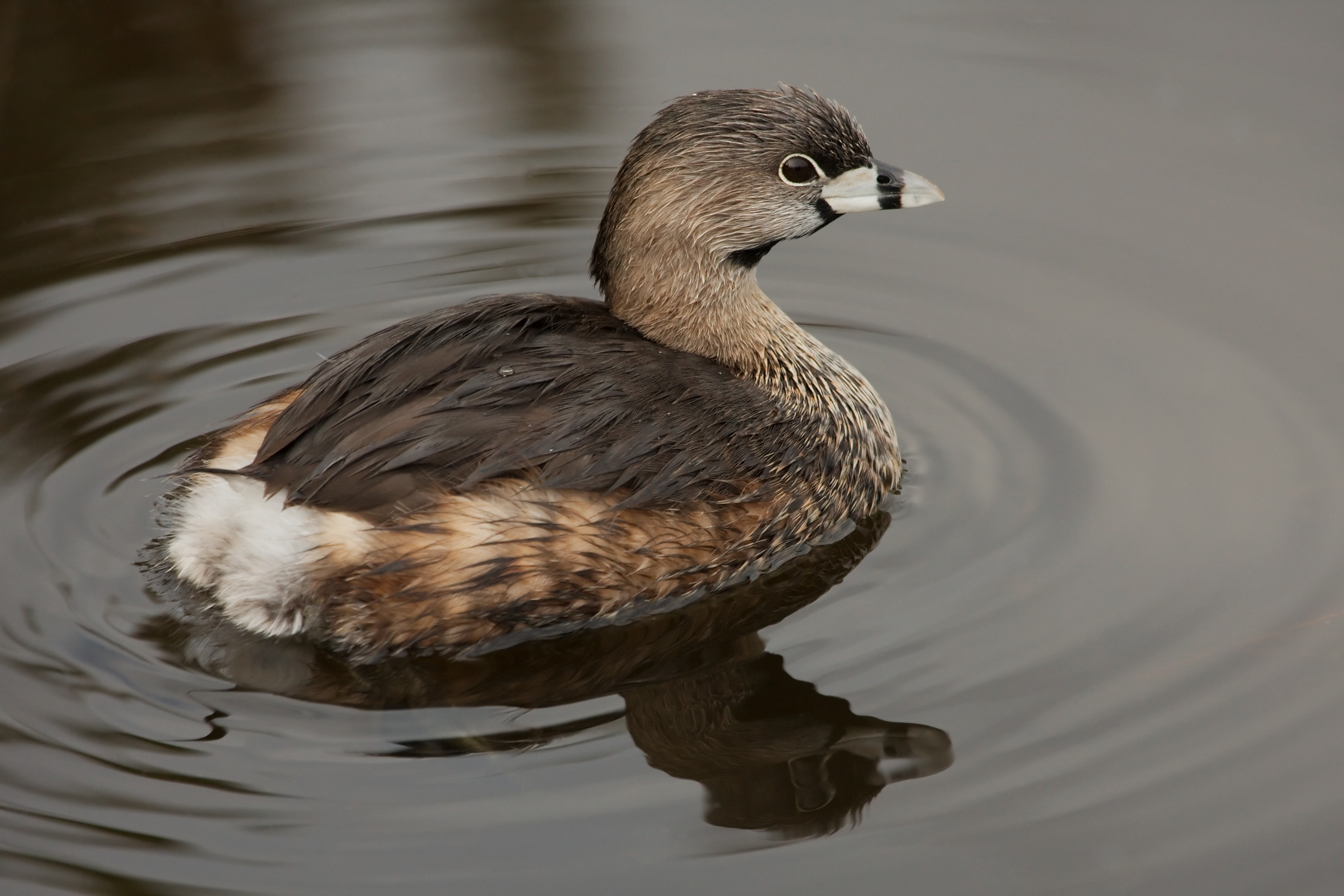
- Pied-billed grebes breed in the IBA

- Location within Curaçao
- Location: Curaçao
- Nearest city: Willemstad
- Coordinates: 12°09′27″N 68°55′07″W
- Area: 0.65 km^{2} (0.25 sq mi)
- Established: 2013

Ramsar Wetland
- Official name: Muizenberg
- Designated: 5 February 2013
- Reference no.: 2118

Muizenberg is a wetland and protected area on the Dutch Caribbean island of Curaçao. Located within the northern suburbs of the capital, Willemstad, the wetland is surrounded by well-developed suburbs that are among the most densely populated in Curaçao. The majority of the wetland consists of a shallow, artificial lake formed by the Muizenberg dam, built by Shell Curaçao in 1915. Despite being the largest freshwater body on the island with a capacity of 650,000 cubic metres, the lake is seasonal and usually only lasts for around six months annually, although it is permanent in years with sufficient rainfall. As the lake's waters recede every year, it is replaced by grassland and scrub vegetation.

The wetland is protected as a Natural Park area by the Curaçaoan government and is a designated Important Bird Area and Ramsar site. It supports a breeding population of around 800 Caribbean coots, alongside several other waterbirds, and acts as a stopover site for American flamingos. It also harbours populations of Van de Poll's molly, a rare fish endemic to the islands of Aruba, Bonaire, and Curaçao.

== History ==
Formed in 1915 after Shell Curaçao built the Muizenberg dam to collect water for industrial cooling needs, the artificial lake has a capacity of 650,000 cubic metres and is the largest freshwater body on Curaçao. The wetland and its surroundings were recognised as a Natural Park area by the island's government in 1995. In 2007, the lake was recognised as an Important Bird Area by BirdLife International. In 2013, it was designated a Ramsar site. The Park area is currently widely used by hikers. The northeastern side of the area suffers from illegal garbage dumping.

== Description ==
Curaçao is a constituent island nation of the Kingdom of the Netherlands in the Dutch Caribbean. The site is in central Curaçao, lying within the northern suburbs of the capital, Willemstad. The wetland consists of a seasonal lake formed by a dammed stream that collects water from the adjacent hills. The largest freshwater body on the island, the shallow lake is usually present for around six months annually, although it is permanent in years with sufficient rainfall. The wetland is surrounded by seasonally flooded grasslands and scrub, with vegetation growing back as the lake recedes each year. The borders of the site are marked by busy roads, with the surrounding neighborhoods being well-developed suburbs that are among the most densely populated in Curaçao. The northeastern portion of the wetland abuts small farms. 200 m west of Muizenberg dam itself is a small lake at the intersection of Seru Fortuna and Cabo Verde roads; Kaya Fortuna pond covers a maximum area of 200 m^{2} at the peak of the wet season.

The IBA and Ramsar site have different geographical boundaries, with only 73.4% of the IBA being covered by the Ramsar site and the Ramsar site including additional areas to the south of the dam not included in the IBA.

=== Birds ===
It has been identified as an Important Bird Area by BirdLife International because it supports Caribbean coots, a rare color morph of American coots, around 800 of whom breed there annually. Common moorhens, pied-billed grebes, and white-cheeked pintails breed there and American flamingos feed there. The 65 ha Muizenberg lake has been recognised as a wetland of international importance by designation as a Ramsar site.

=== Other fauna ===
Van de Poll's molly (Poecilia vandepolli), a species of molly endemic to the Dutch Caribbean islands of Aruba, Bonaire, and Curaçao, is found in the lake.
