= Bushiribana =

Historic structures on Aruba, Caribbean

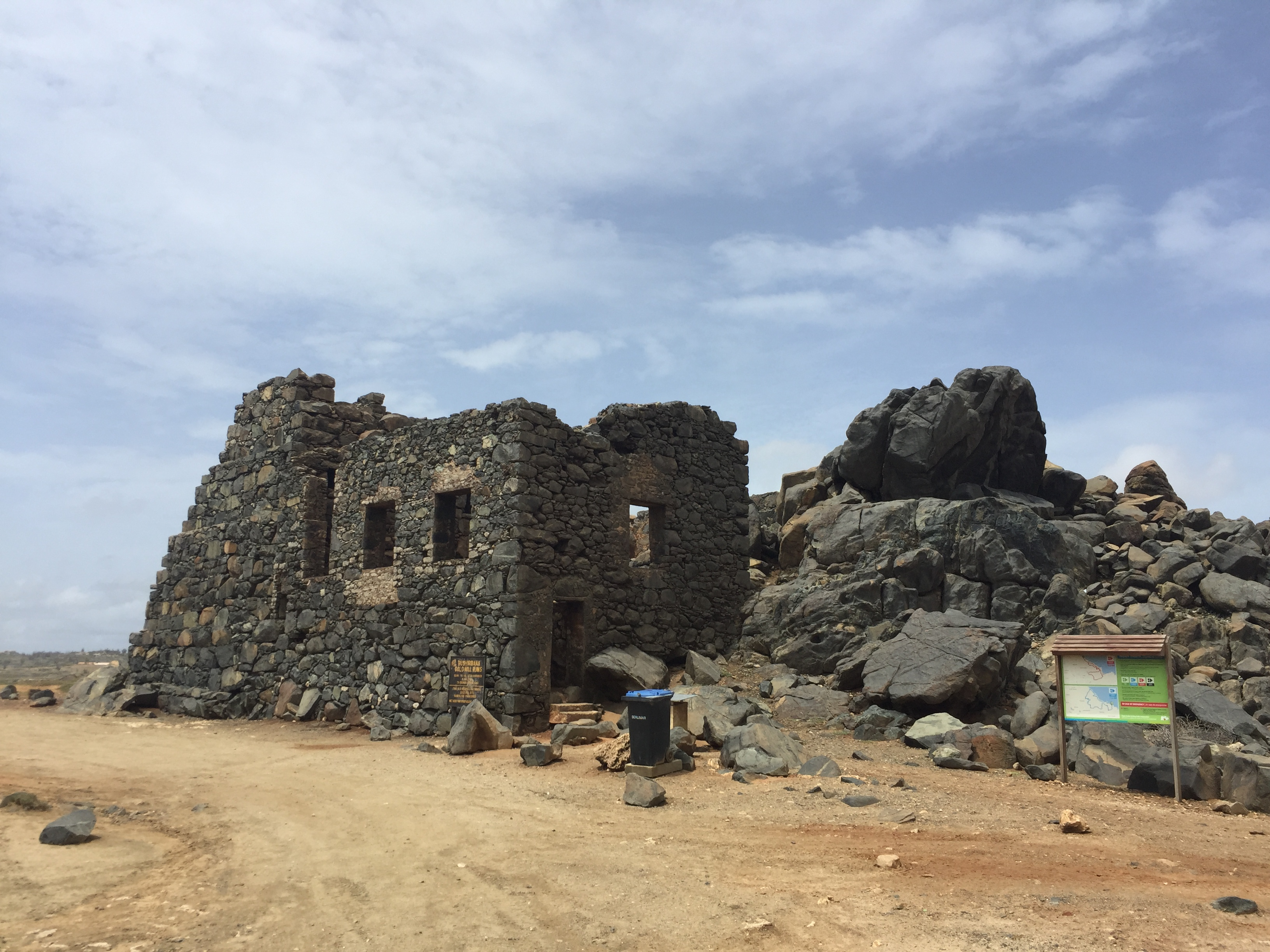
- Bushiribana gold mill
- Interactive map of the Bushiribana area

General information
- Location: Bushiribana, Matividiri, Aruba
- Completed: 1872

Technical details
- Material: Gabbro

Bushiribana is a ruin of a former gold mill on Aruba. The Aruba Island Gold Mining Company built the gold mill in 1825 to extract gold from the ore that was being mined in the nearby hills of Sero Plat; it operated for ten years.

== See also ==
- Balashi
