= Spaans Lagoen =

Protected area in Aruba

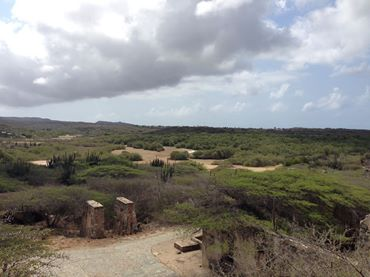
- Interactive map of Spaans Lagoen
- Location: Aruba
- Nearest city: Oranjestad
- Coordinates: 12.47685°N 69.97258°W
- Area: 0.7 km^{2} (0.27 sq mi)
- Established: 1980
- Website: https://www.protectedplanet.net/14067

Ramsar Wetland
- Official name: Het Spaans Lagoen
- Designated: 23 May 1980
- Reference no.: 198

Spaans Lagoen, which translates to "Spanish lagoon", is a coastal bay and wetland area of Aruba. Designated as a Ramsar site since 1980, and in February 2017, it was included within the boundary of the Arikok National Park. It is the only inner bay of Aruba and was formed during the last ice age. This ecosystem features tidal mudflats and mangrove swamps, serving as a vital feeding and breeding ground for birds. Spaans Lagoen is one of the highest biodiversity areas on Aruba. It is also adjacent to Arikok National Park.

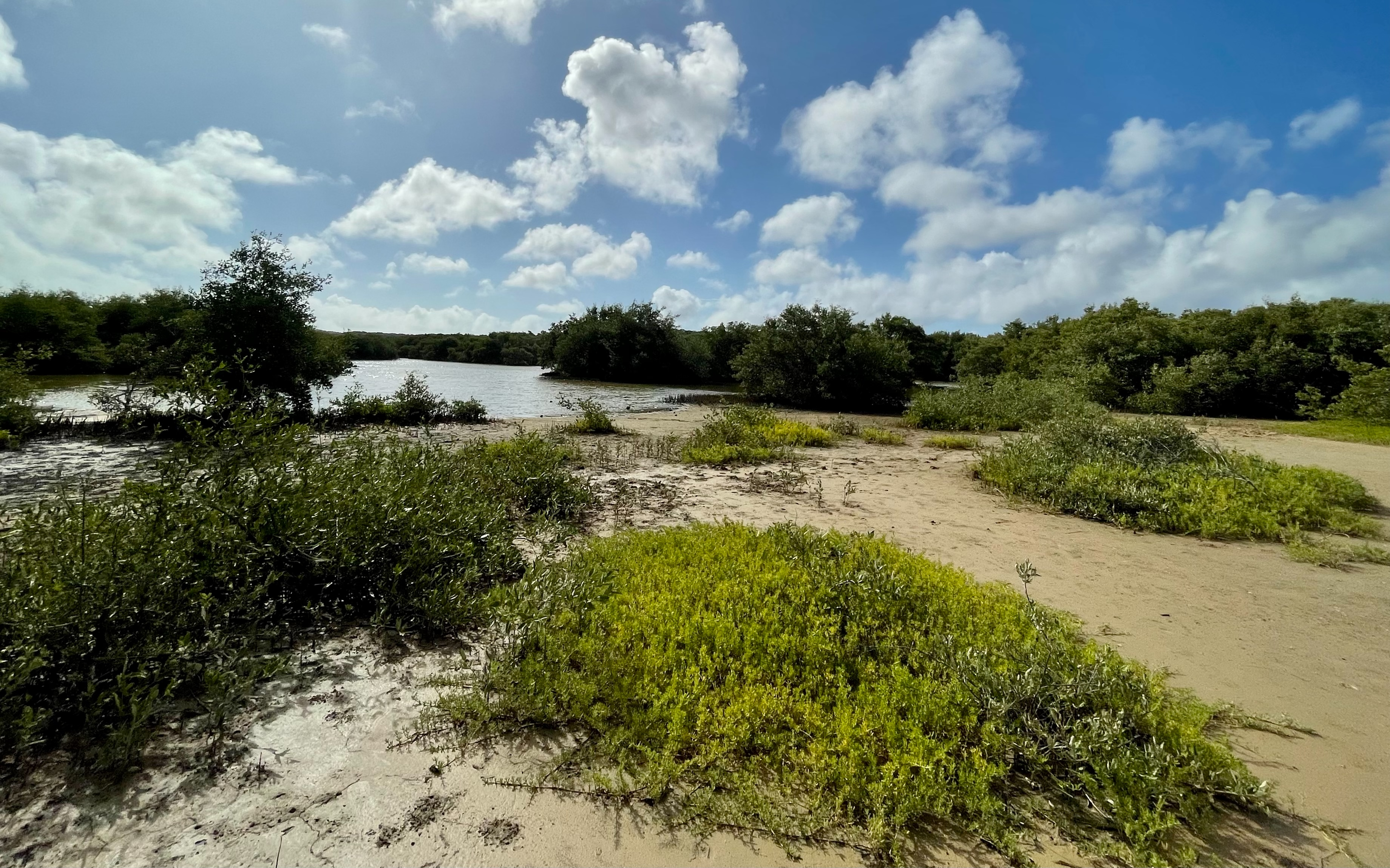
Spaans Lagoen wetland

== Overview ==
Spaans Lagoen stretches approximately 2 kilometres (1.2 mi) in length and ranges in width from 200 to 500 metres (660 to 1,640 ft) wide, covering an area of 70 hectares (170 acres). Its distinctive tidal influence has given rise to a rare ecosystem, with its shores covered by mangroves. This area plays a crucial role as a feeding and breeding ground for birds and a nursery for reef fish and crustaceans. Palm Island is located at the mouth of Spaans Lagoen, with Frenchman's Pass located to the north.

== History ==
=== Settlement archaeology ===
Around 4500 BP, the ABC islands were frequented by fishermen and gatherers from the Venezuelan or possibly Colombian coast, drawn to the islands for their abundant shellfish, particularly Lobatus gigas. They set up temporary camps near mangrove areas and lagoons on Aruba, notably Spaans Lagoen. Evidence of human activity, including charcoal deposits, has been found in sediment layers at Frenchman's Pass (Spaans Lagoen) dating to around 1000 BC.

== Ecological environment ==
=== Habitats ===
==== Spaans Lagoen Bay ====
Spaans Lagoen has two main bodies of water: the channel and the lagoon. It serves as a vital area for recruiting and raising, supporting adult populations from surrounding ecosystems. Water birds, including birds of prey like Ospreys, use the bay as a feeding ground, often seen catching fish.

==== Mangrove forest ====
The shores of Spaans Lagoen Bay, lined with mangroves, play a crucial role in preserving the region's biological diversity. Within this mangrove forest, four different mangrove species can be found: Red Mangrove (Rhizophora mangle), Black Mangrove (Avicennia germinans), White Mangrove (Laguncularia racemosa), and Buttonwood (Conocarpus erectus). These mangroves serve as vital nurseries and sanctuaries for numerous reef fish and crustaceans. Additionally, the mangroves act as breeding and roosting sites for a variety of migratory and non-migratory bird species, providing support for wintering and foraging wetland birds, including various Sandpipers, Egrets, and Herons.

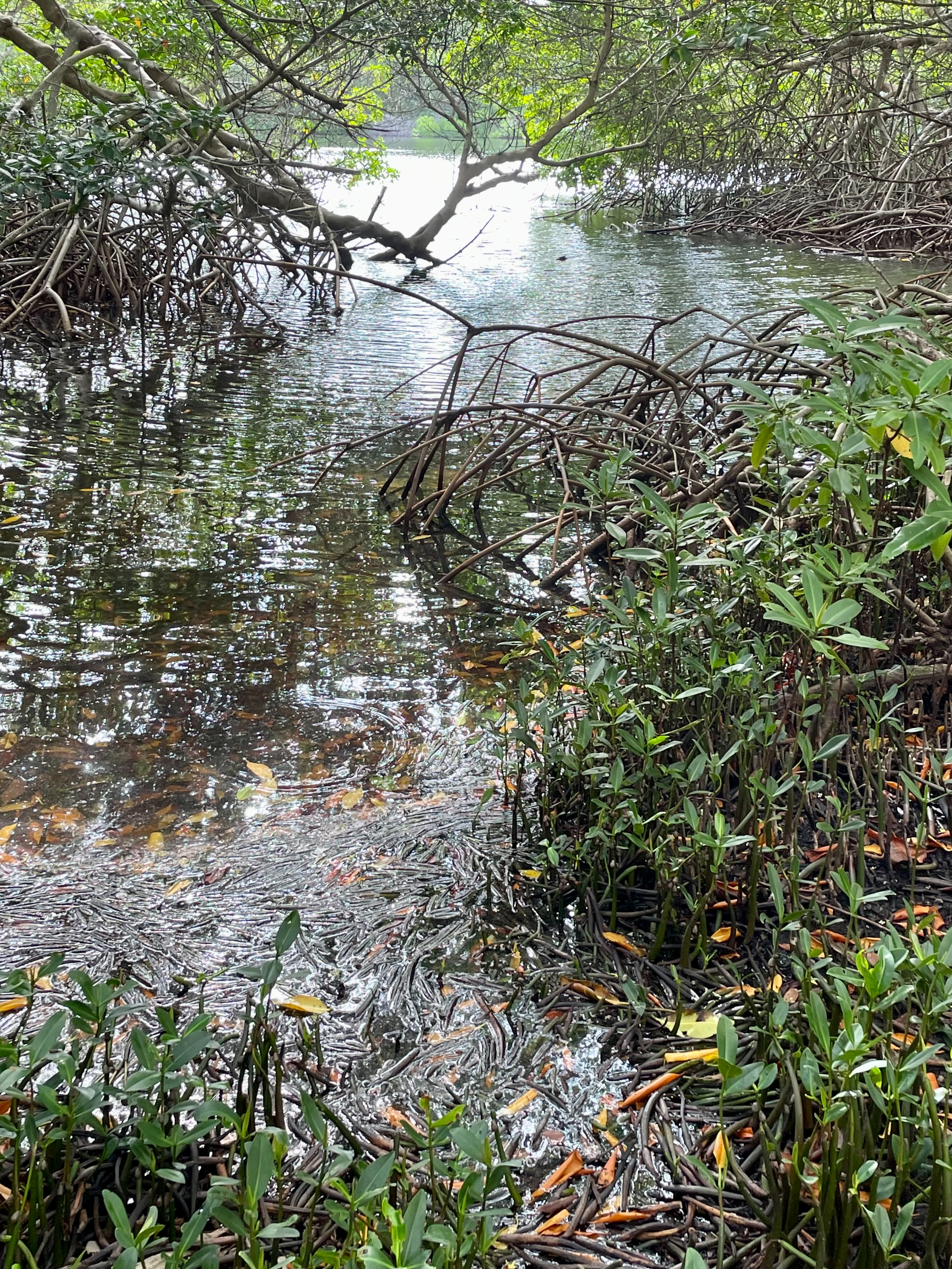
View of mangroves from the northern shore

==== Mudflats ====
The mudflats in the inland section of the Spaans Lagoen border the mangrove forest and experience daily tidal inundation. Numerous bird species come here during the day to search for food. The drier sections of the mudflats serve as ideal habitats for Aruban Burrowing Owls (Athene cunicularia arubensis), which create their burrows. Additionally, during the rainy season, land crabs can be observed crossing the mudflats in search of water to lay their eggs.

==== Rooi ====
The mudflats are connected to three dry river creeks or Arroyo, known as rooi in Papiamento. These roois only have water after heavy rainfall. Two of them, Rooi Bringamosa and Rooi Taki, are part of the Arikok National Park, extending from the northeastern to the southwestern coast of Aruba. The third rooi is Rooi Frances (Frenchman's Pass). Roois often feature fertile soil and a high water table, making them ideal for fruit trees like Sweet Tamarind and Spanish Lime. Shaded areas within roois can retain water for longer periods, serving as oasis for land animals like Eastern Cottontail Rabbits and supporting diverse aquatic life, including various species of Dragonflies and the Colombian Four-eyed Frog.

==== Aruba Lava Formation ====
The northeastern border of the Spaans Lagoen extends from the volcanic rock and sediment typical of Arikok National Park. Similar habitats are found here, featuring various types of cacti and iconic endemic species like the Aruban Rattlesnake (Crotalus unicolor) and Brown-throated Parakeet (Eupsittula pertinax).

==== Limestone cliffs and terraces ====
Limestone cliffs and terraces encircle the Spaans Lagoen from nearly all directions. These areas exhibit low vegetation and a xeric landscape, creating a distinct contrast within the site. They are dominated by different species of Aloe, remnants of the former Aloe plantations. Crested Caracaras are often spotted perched on the cliffs, keeping watch for their next meal.

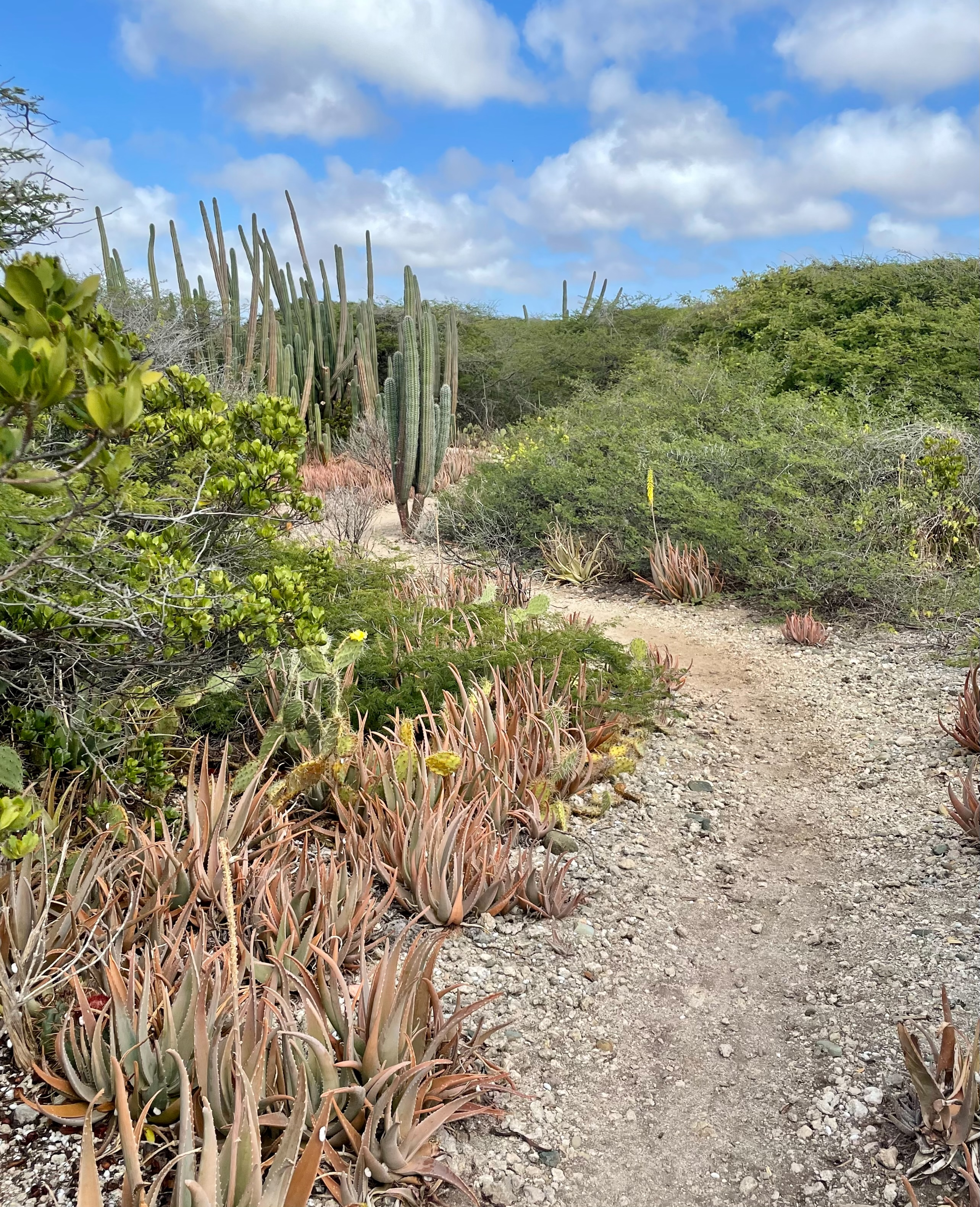
Hiking trail in the surrounding xeric landscape

=== Environmental impact ===
The lagoon is located halfway between the Queen Beatrix International Airport and the town of San Nicolaas. In 2016, the Green Corridor was constructed to provide better access to San Nicolas, including the construction of a bridge over Spaans Lagoen. During the bridge construction, a section of the mangrove forest was damaged. To address this, an S-shaped canal was created to compensate for the damage and facilitate mangrove regeneration.

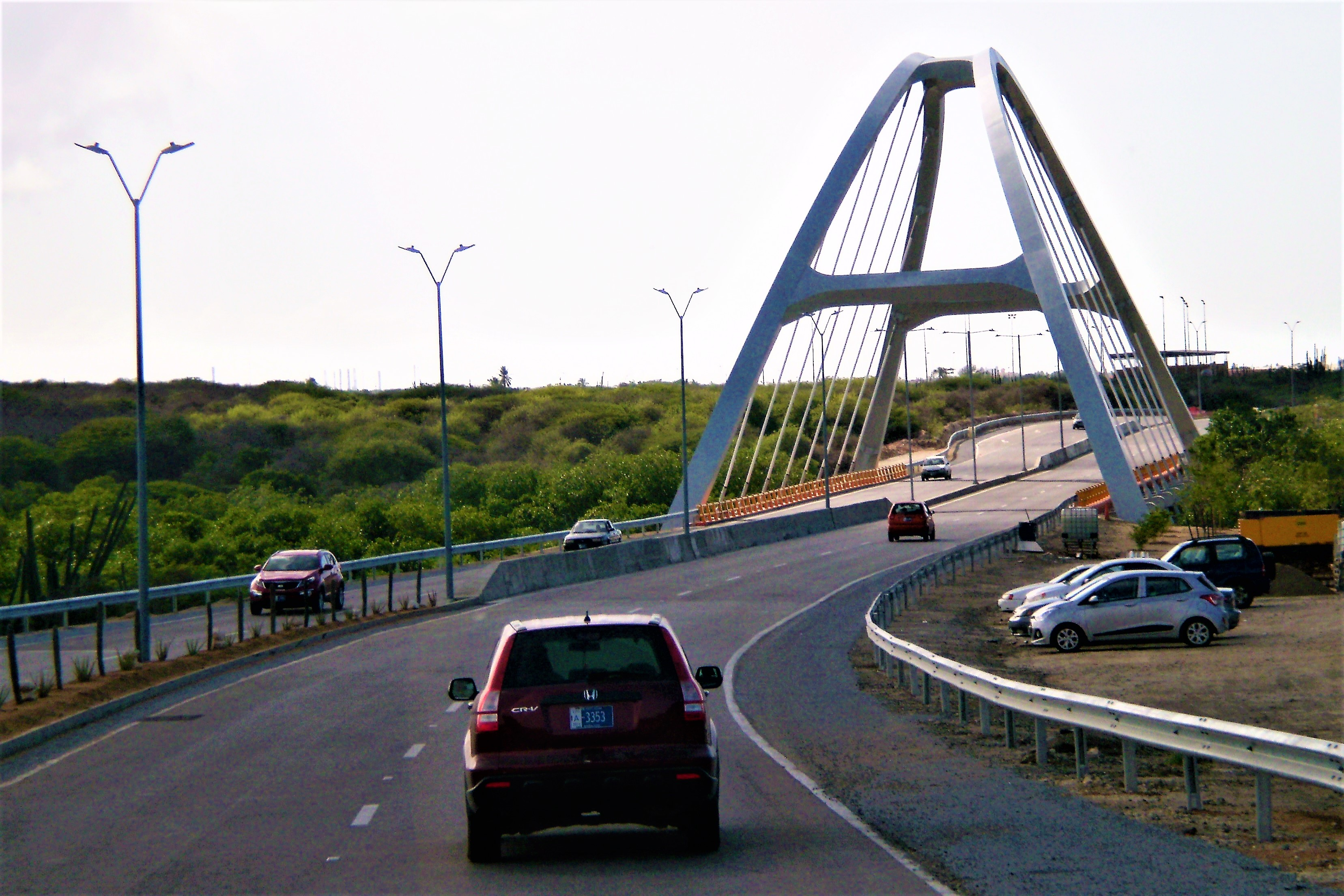
Fredis Refunjol bridge over Spaans Lagoen

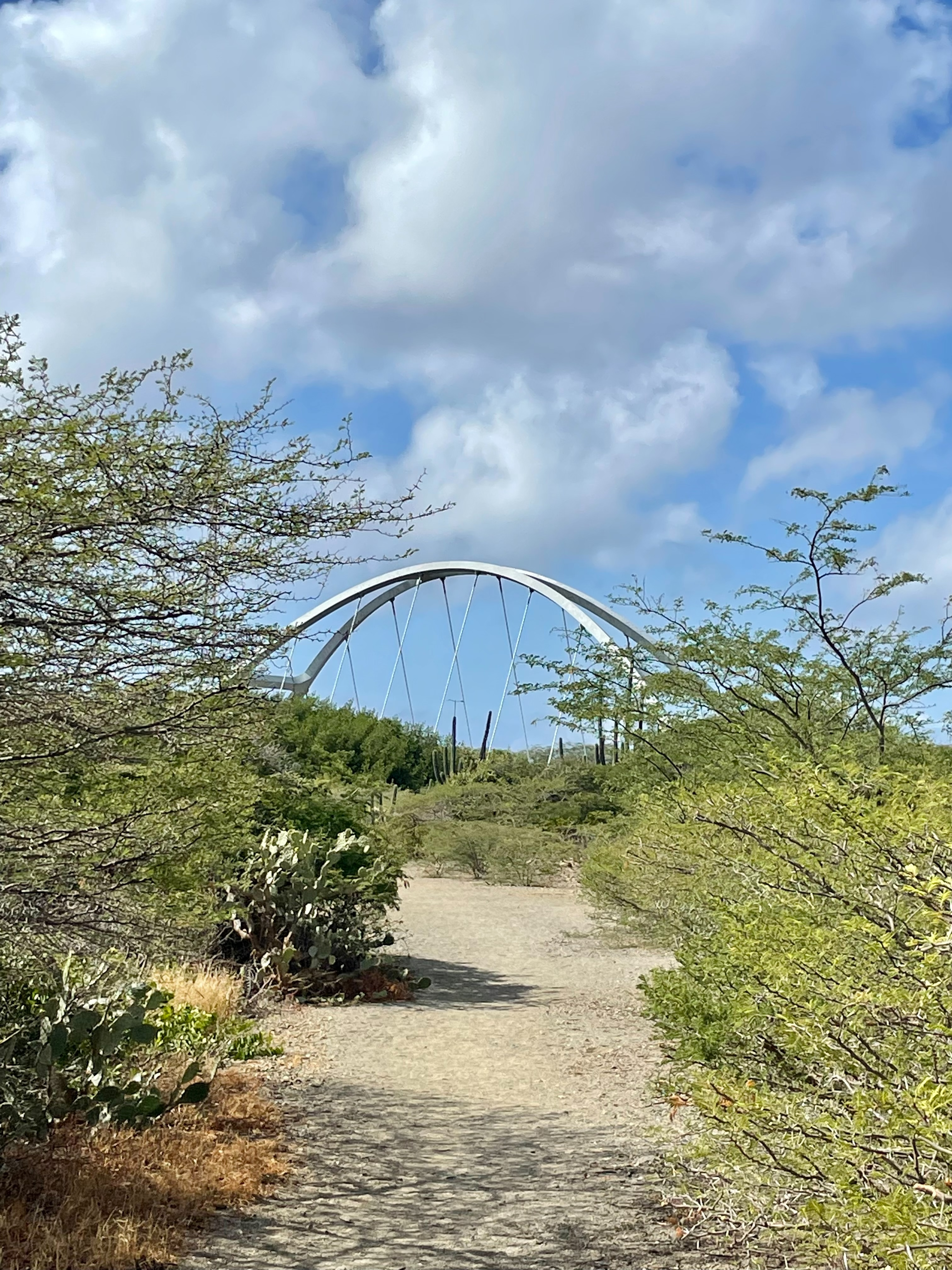
Visual pollution of Fredis Refunjol bridge on Spaans Lagoen trail

== Sources ==
- Kelly, Harold; Hofman, Corinne L. (2019). "The Archaic Age of Aruba: New evidence on the first migrations to the island". In Hofman, Corinne L.; Antczak, Andrzej T. (eds.). Early Settlers of the Insular Caribbean: Dearchaizing the archaic. Leiden: Sidestone Press. pp. 147–161.
