= Ascocotyle pindoramensis =

Scientific classification
- Kingdom: Animalia
- Phylum: Platyhelminthes
- Class: Trematoda
- Order: Plagiorchiida
- Family: Heterophyidae
- Genus: Ascocotyle
- Species: A. pindoramensis

Binomial name
- Ascocotyle pindoramensis (Travassos, 1928)

Synonyms
- Pygidiopsis pindoramensis Travassos, 1928; Pseudoascocotyle mollienisicola Sogandares-Bernal and Bridgman, 1960; Ascocotyle (Phagicola) mollienisicola: Sogandares-Bernal and Lumsden, 1963; Ascocotyle (Phagicola) pindoramensis: Simões et al., 2006

Species of fluke

Ascocotyle pindoramensis is a fluke in the genus Ascocotyle that occurs along the eastern coast of the Americas from Brazil to Nicaragua, Mexico, Louisiana, and Florida and doubtfully in Egypt. It occurs in the intestine of its definitive hosts. Hosts recorded in the wild include the least bittern (Ixobrychus exilis), roseate spoonbill (Platalea ajaja), great blue heron (Ardea herodias), striated heron (Butorides striatus), stripe-backed bittern (Ixobrychus involucris), yellow-crowned night heron (Nyctanassa violacea), black-crowned night heron (Nycticorax nycticorax), osprey (Pandion haliaetus), Neotropic cormorant (Phalacrocorax brasilianus), and marsh rice rat (Oryzomys palustris). In the marsh rice rat, it infected 9% of rats examined in a 1970–1972 study in the salt marsh at Cedar Key, Florida, but none in a freshwater marsh. A. pindoramensis has been experimentally introduced into the domestic duck (Anas platyrhynchos domestica), chicken (Gallus gallus domestica), dog (Canis lupus familiaris), house mouse (Mus musculus), and golden hamster (Mesocricetus auratus). It occurs in various body parts of its intermediate hosts—the poeciliid fish Phalloptychus januarius, Poecilia catemaconis, Poecilia mexicana, Poecilia mollienisicola, Poecilia vivipara, and a species of Xiphophorus and the cichlid Tilapia. It was first described as Pygidiopsis pindoramensis in 1928 and subsequently as Pseudoascocotyle mollienisicola in 1960. The latter species was moved to Ascocotyle in 1963, but only in 2006 it was recognized that the two represent the same species, which is now known as Ascocotyle pindoramensis. Other flukes from Argentina and Mexico that were identified as Pygidiopsis pindoramensis instead represent a different species of Pygidiopsis.

== See also ==
- List of parasites of the marsh rice rat

== Literature cited ==
- Kinsella, J.M. 1988. Comparison of helminths of rice rats, Oryzomys palustris, from freshwater and saltwater marshes in Florida. Proceedings of the Helminthological Society of Washington 55(2):275–280.
- Simões, S.B.E., Scholz, T., Barbosa, H.S. and Santos, C.P. 2006. Taxonomic status, redescription, and surface ultrastructure of Ascocotyle (Phragicola) pindoramensis n. comb. (Digenea: Heterophyidae) (subscription required). Journal of Parasitology 92(3):501–508.
- Travassos, L. 1928. Sur une nouvelle espèce du genre Pygidiopsis, Pygidiopsis pindoramensis n. sp. (Trematoda). Comptes Rendus de la Société de Biologie, Paris 100:956–957 (in French).
