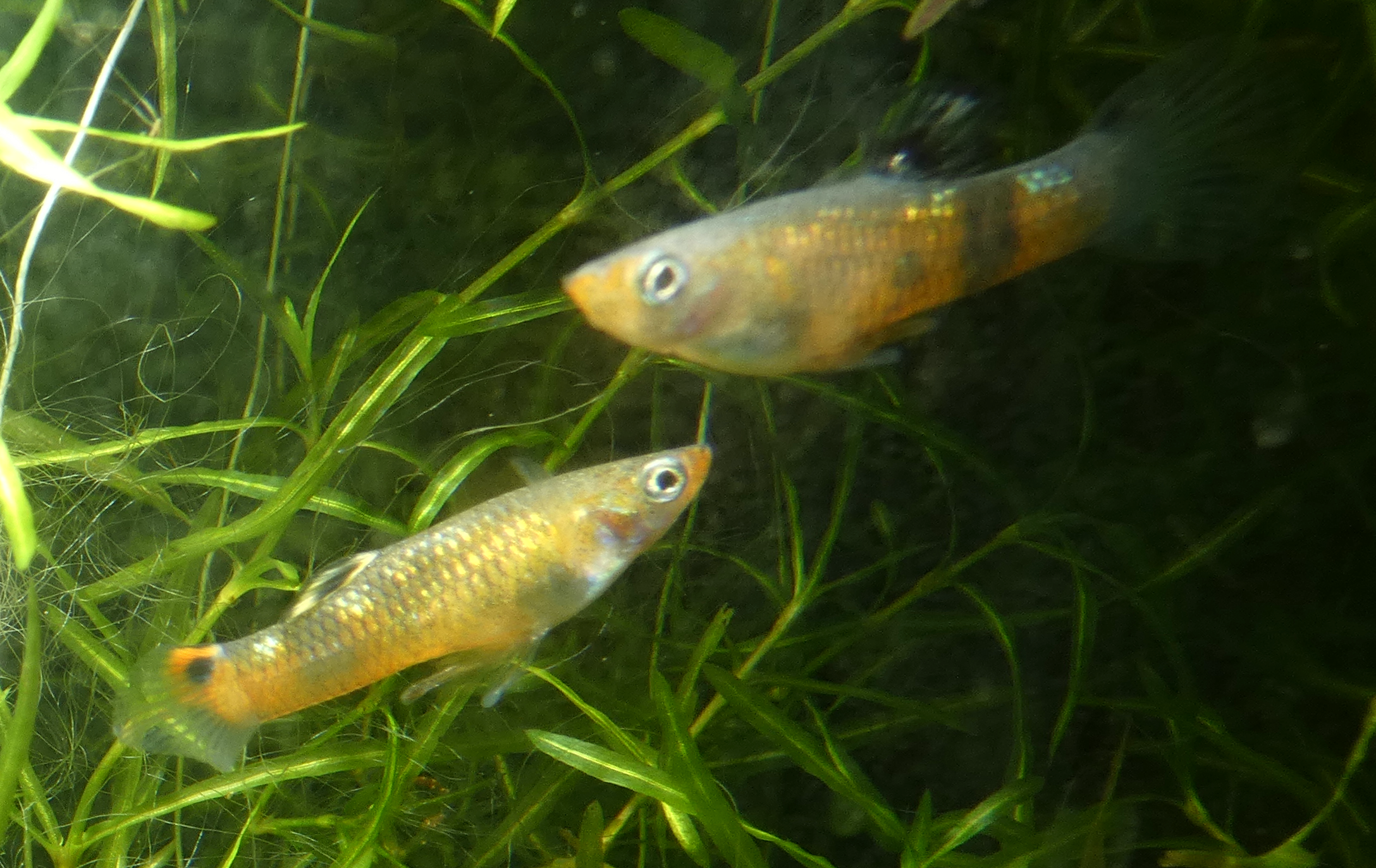
- Gold morph males

Conservation status
- Least Concern (IUCN 3.1)

Scientific classification
- Kingdom: Animalia
- Phylum: Chordata
- Class: Actinopterygii
- Order: Cyprinodontiformes
- Family: Poeciliidae
- Genus: Poecilia
- Species: P. picta

Binomial name
- Poecilia picta Regan, 1913

Synonyms
- Micropoecilia picta

= Poecilia picta =

Swamp guppy

Species of livebearer fish

Poecilia picta, the swamp guppy, is a species of livebearer fish found in South America. It is closely related to the common guppy, P. reticulata, and shares its geographic range but tends to be found in more brackish environments.

== Taxonomy ==
P. picta forms a clade with P. parae that is a sister taxon to the common guppy, P. reticulata. Some authorities place the species in the genus Poecilia, subgenus Lebistes, along with P. reticulata, P. parae, P. branneri, and P. amazonica; others place it in the genus Micropoecilia along with P. parae and P. branneri.

== Description ==
Males grow to about 18 mm; females reach sexual maturity at that size too but, as in most other poeciliids, continue to grow, reaching 20 mm. Males also differ from females by being more colorful, with black-spotted bodies and black, yellow, or orange coloration in their dorsal and caudal fins. Three color morphs exist in the wild among males: standard, red, and gold. The colorful forms are known from mainland populations but not from the insular.

== Distribution and habitat ==
P. picta is distributed throughout northeastern South America, including Guyana, Suriname, and Venezuela, and the Caribbean islands, a range it shares with the closely related guppies P. reticulata and P. parae.

P. picta occurs in lowland habitats such as slowly-flowing waters at stream mouths and still water lagoons. These are often brackish. It tolerates a wide range of salinity levels but gradually disappears from upstream freshwater sites due to competition with P. reticulata, which in turn avoids higher levels of salinity. The two species rarely form mixed shoals. P. picta commonly congregates among marginal aquatic plants.

== Ecology ==
P. picta is omnivorous, feeding on cyanobacteria and animal matter. Potential predators found in its habitats include Polycentrus schomburgkii, Hoplias malabaricus, Synbranchus marmoratus, Astyanax bimaculatus, and Roeboides dayi, the first two of which frequently prey on fish.

== Reproduction ==
P. picta is a livebearer. Males engage in a courtship display which involves circling the female's head and may be accepted or rejected by females. In stark contrast to the closely related P. reticulata and P. parae, P. picta females show no preference for males with pronounced red or orange coloration. Females carry only one brood at a time. Larger females deliver more fry, with the number normally ranging from 7 to 11, but can reach 25.
