= Balashi =

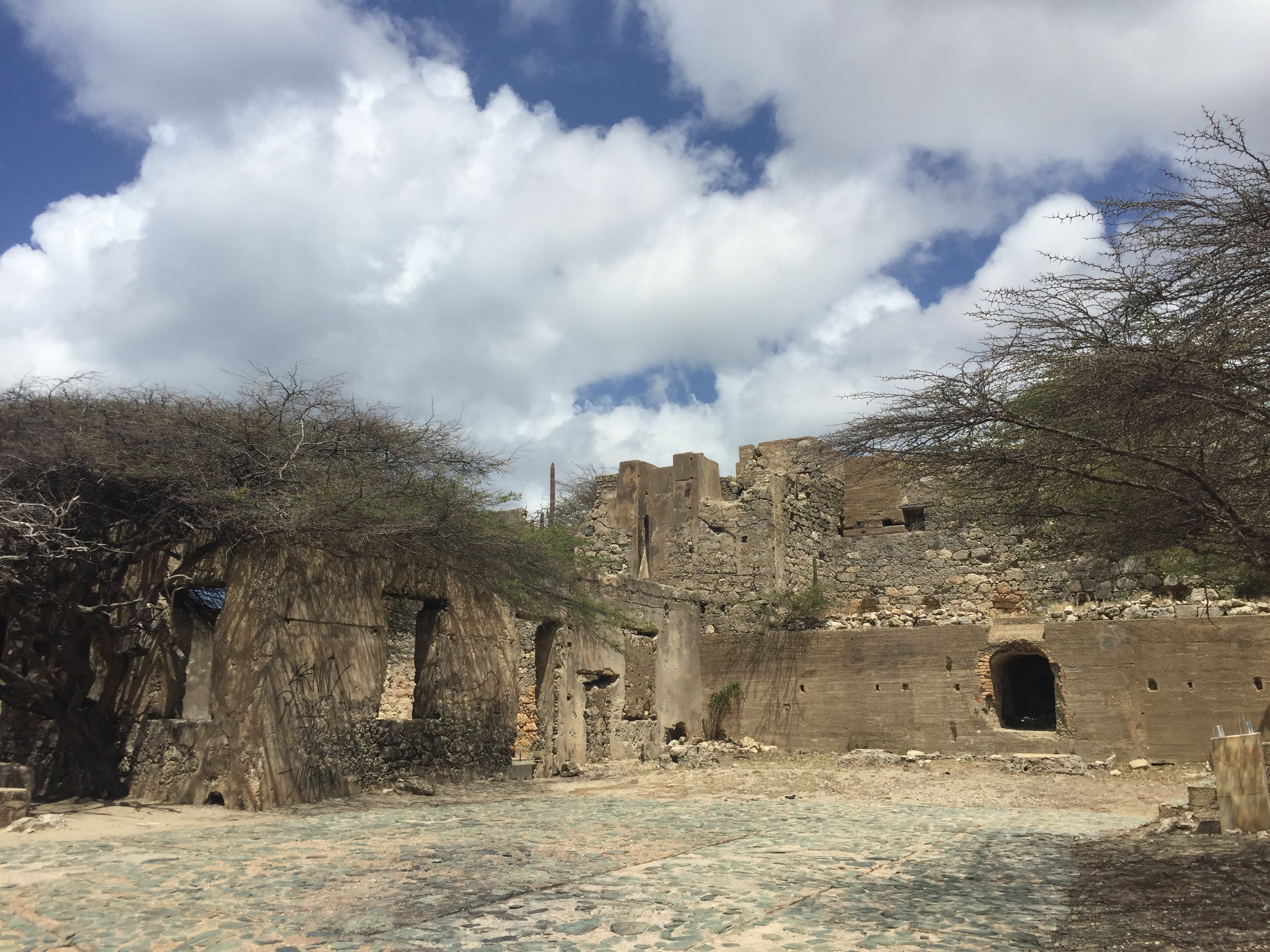
Balashi gold mine

Balashi is a former gold smelter on Aruba.

In 1899, the Aruba Gold Concessions Company built a gold smelter at Balashi, at the southern end of Frenchman's Pass. In 1916 during the First World War, it closed for lack of raw materials and spare parts, as most of them came from Germany.

In 1933, a sea water desalination plant was constructed at Balashi.

== See also ==
- Bushiribana
