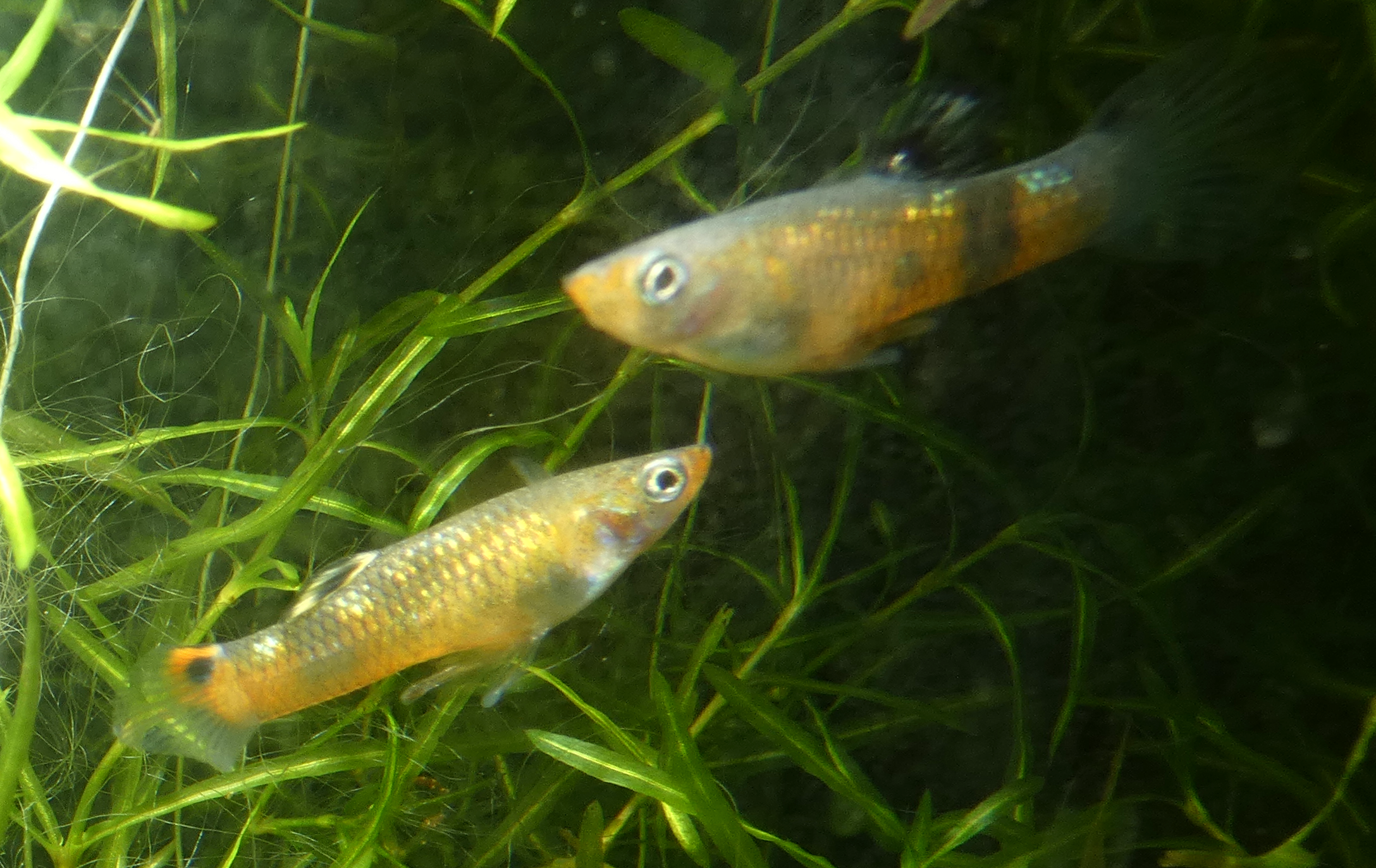

Scientific classification
- Kingdom: Animalia
- Phylum: Chordata
- Class: Actinopterygii
- Order: Cyprinodontiformes
- Family: Poeciliidae
- Tribe: Poeciliini
- Genus: Micropoecilia; C. L. Hubbs, 1926

Type species
- Poecilia vivipara parae Eigenmann, 1894

= Micropoecilia =

Genus of fishes

Micropoecilia is a genus of poeciliids native to fresh and brackish water from the Amazon Basin to Trinidad. While recognized as valid by FishBase, others have considered this genus as being synonymous with Poecilia.

== Species ==
There are currently four recognized species in this genus:

- Micropoecilia bifurca (C. H. Eigenmann, 1909)
- Micropoecilia branneri (C. H. Eigenmann, 1894) (Branner's livebearer)
- Micropoecilia minima (W. J. E. M. Costa & Sarraf, 1997)

=== Related species ===
- Micropoecilia parae (C. H. Eigenmann, 1894) (Melanzona guppy)
- Micropoecilia picta (Regan, 1913) (Swamp guppy)

The type species of the genus is Micropoecilia parae but this is not included within the genus by Fishbase but other workers have recovered this species within the subgenus Micropoecilia of Poecilia, arguing that Micropoecilia, alongside the subgenera Acanthophacelus, Limia, Pamphorichthys and Mollienesia should all be retained as subgenera of Poecilia, which is remains a monopyletic clade in this classification. This is partly to ensure the conserving of the guppy (Poecilia reticulata) as a species within the genus due to its familiarity as a study organism.
