= Poecilia wandae =

Scientific classification
- Kingdom: Animalia
- Phylum: Chordata
- Class: Actinopterygii
- Order: Cyprinodontiformes
- Family: Poeciliidae
- Genus: Poecilia
- Species: P. wandae

Binomial name
- Poecilia wandae Poeser, 2003

Species of livebearer fish

Poecilia wandae is a poeciliid fish from Venezuela.

Poecilia wandae is a small poeciliid; adult males reach only 13–22 mm in standard length. The body is generally brown, and most individuals show between seven and ten vertical bars that begin at the caudal peduncle and fade out around the midpoint of the trunk. Some fish also display a stripe that follows the lateral line. The dorsal fin carries a blotch at its base and is edged in black, while the remaining fins lack markings. The species has an elongated profile and a laterally compressed head, and females usually exhibit fewer vertical bars than males. The species is remarkably similar to Poecilia caucana. Some individuals from the Rio San Juan/Rio Negro drainage are unusually pale and unmarked or have dark spots near the caudal base or below the dorsal fin; they may represent a distinct species or merely a color variant of P. wandae.

Poecilia wandae is found in a number of river systems west of the Maracaibo Basin. Fred N. Poeser, who described it, named species after "Vanda Marisa Freitas de Leite, who wishes to be called Wanda."

Morphological studies indicated a close relationship between Poecilia wandae and P. caucana, leading to the former's inclusion in the subgenus Allopoecilia within the genus Poecilia. Genetic studies placed P. wandae among the mollies, subgenus Mollienesia, explaining the similarities with P. caucana as the result of convergent evolution due to similar environmental pressures in the dry regions of northern South America. Its sister species is P. vandepolli; they form a clade with P. koperi and an undescribed species provisionally called P. cf. gillii. P. wandae and P. vandepolli likely diverged when the Lesser Antilles, which P. vandepolli inhabits today, became separated from the mainland by sea. P. koperi and P. wandae diverged slightly earlier than about 150 thousand years ago. The two species appear to be paraphyletic, meaning that their genetic lineages are not fully separated; this may reflect contemporary hybridization and genetic introgression where their ranges meet around Lake Maracaibo.

Distribution of P. boesemani (red), P. koperi (blue), P. vandepolli (yellow) and P. wandae (brown).
