= Frenchman's Pass =

Frenchman's Pass Rooi Frances (Papiamento)
- Pass
- Franse Pas
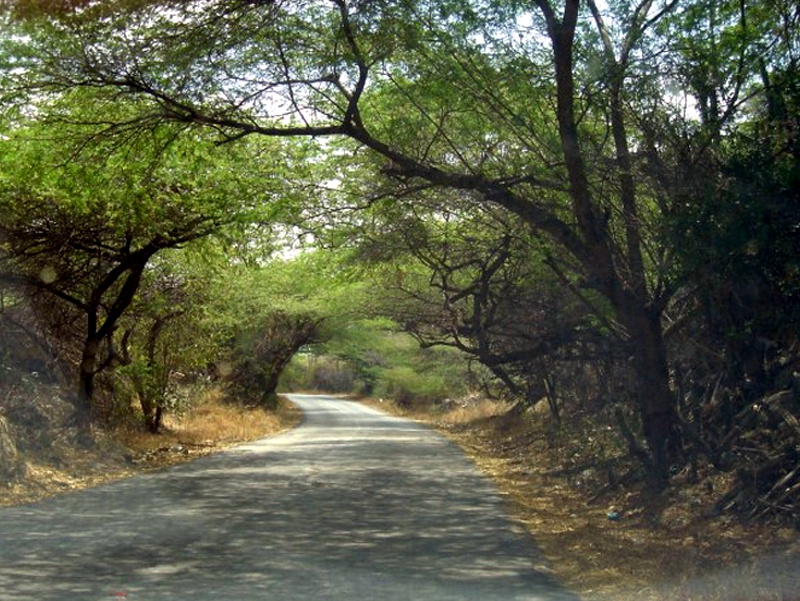
- Frenchman's Pass

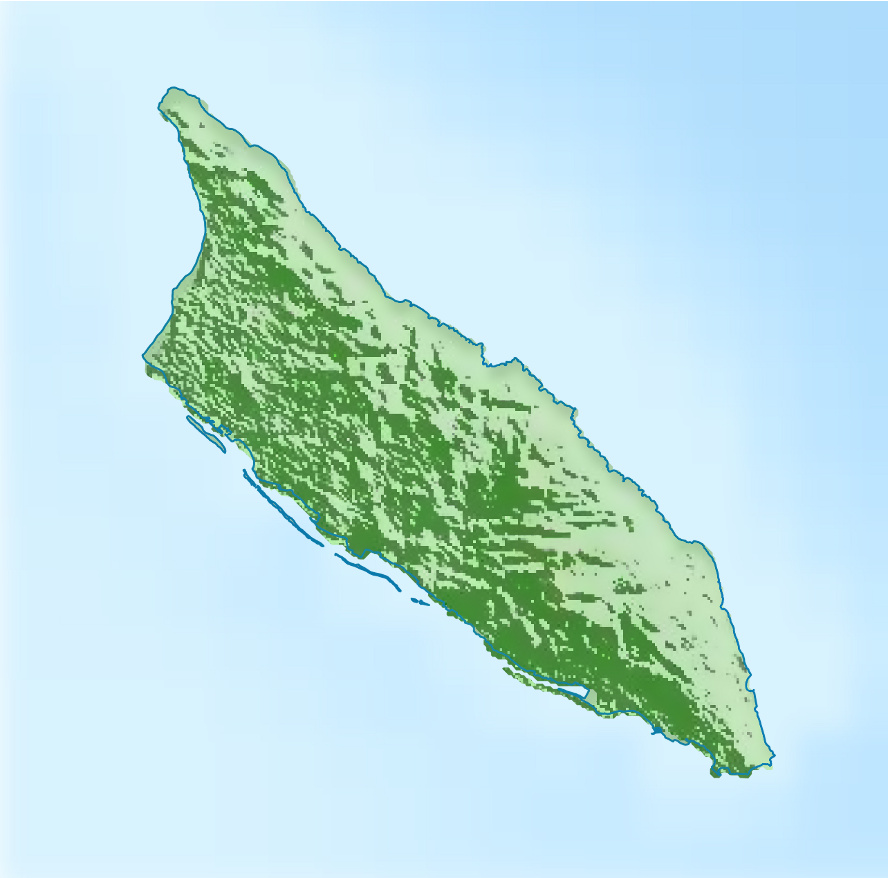
- Location within Aruba
- Coordinates: 12°29′9″N 69°58′20″W
- Location: Spanish Lagoon, Aruba

Franse Pas (in Dutch) or Rooi Frances (in Papiamento) (literally: Frenchman's Pass) is a narrow passage on the island of Aruba, nestled between coral cliffs in Balashi. Frenchman's pass is located north of the area known as Spanish Lagoon and near the remnants of the Balashi Gold Mine.

The legend has it that in the early 17th century, French pirates attempted to invade Aruba but were confronted with fierce resistance from the indigenous people in this narrow passage. This significant encounter left a lasting impact, and as a result, the passage came to be known as Franse Pas in Dutch or Rooi Frances in Papiamento. In English, it translates to “Frenchman Pass".

Many indigenous people were killed during the invasion, and local residents near Frenchman Pass claim to hear haunting cries and noises from the Indians during the evening hours. Some believe that the spirits of the indigenous people awaken, lingering in the Spanish Lagoon area.

Frenchman's Pass is a unique place on the island that captivates the locals. Unlike many ghost stories, which might lack authenticity or serve as mere jokes, this pass plays a significant role in Aruba's folkloric storytelling culture.

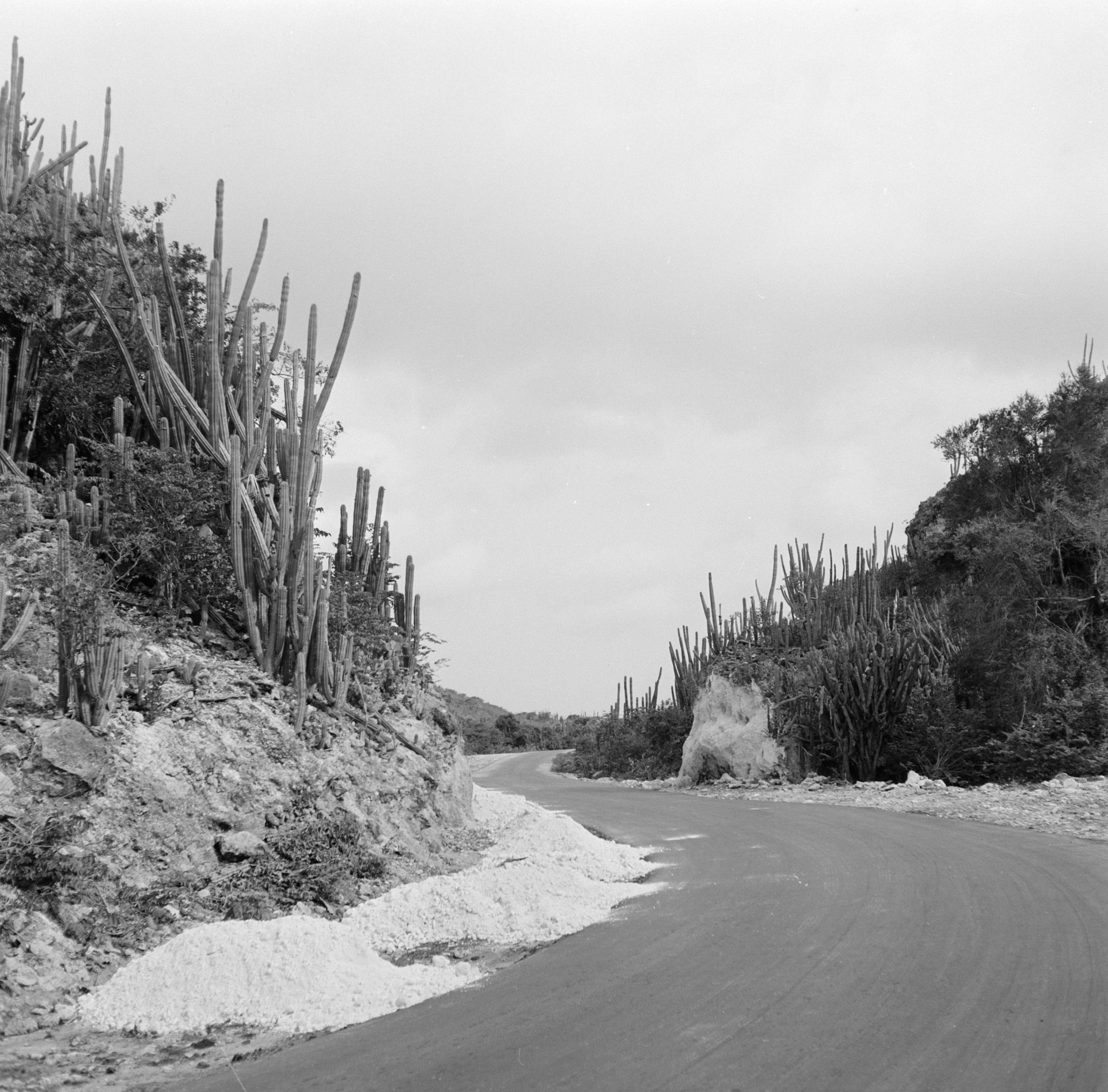
Frenchman's pass (1955)

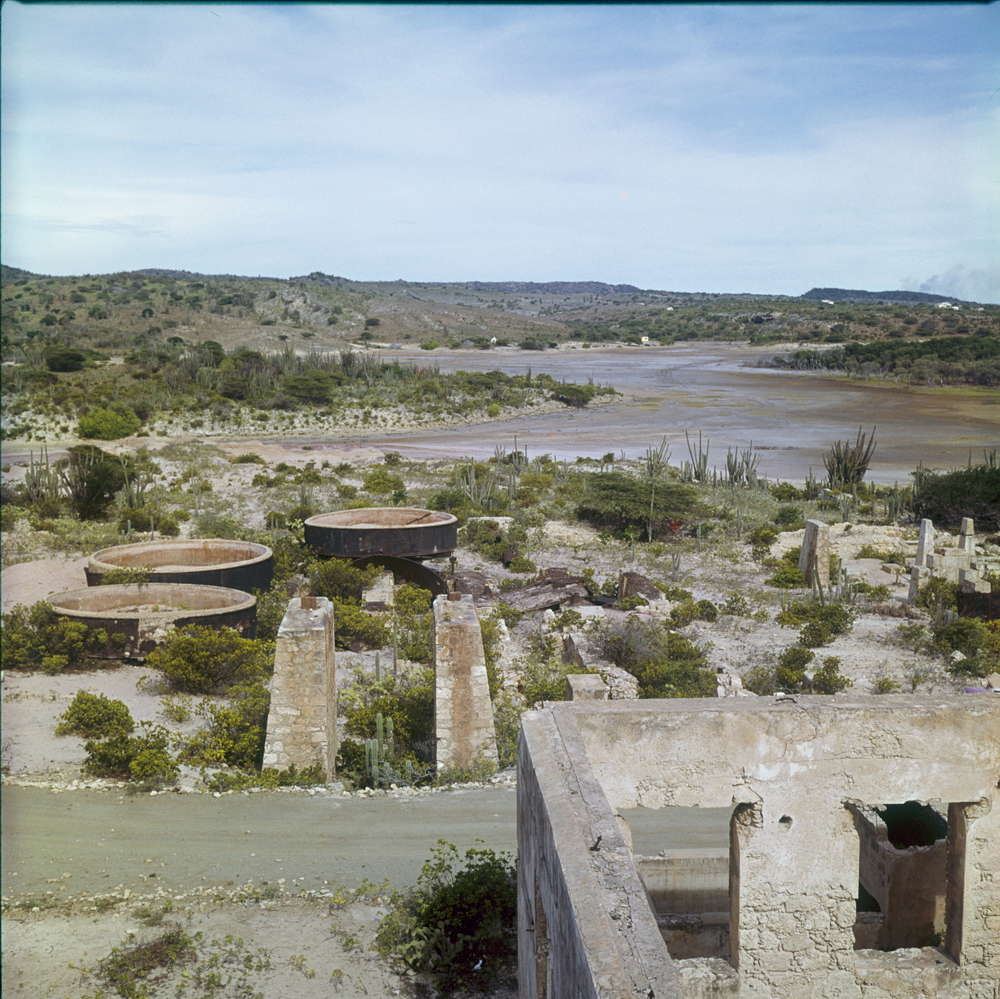
Ruins of the Balashi gold smelter near the Spanish Lagoon and the French Pass (1964)
