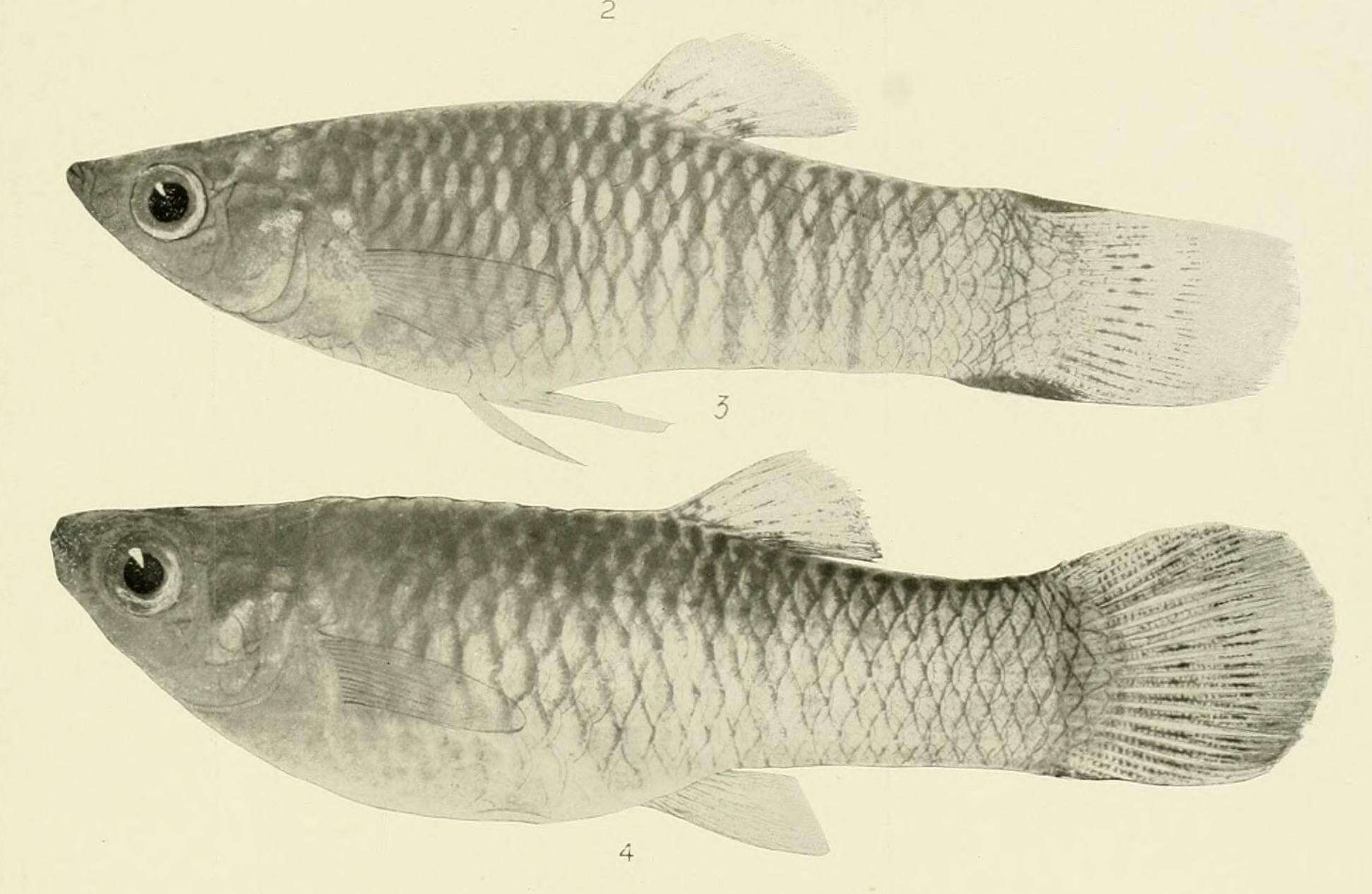
- Male (top) and female (bottom)

Conservation status
- Least Concern (IUCN 3.1)

Scientific classification
- Kingdom: Animalia
- Phylum: Chordata
- Class: Actinopterygii
- Order: Cyprinodontiformes
- Family: Poeciliidae
- Genus: Poecilia
- Species: P. vivipara

Binomial name
- Poecilia vivipara Bloch & Schneider, 1801

Synonyms
- Poecilia surinamensis (Valenciennes, 1821); Poecilia unimaculata (Valenciennes, 1821)

= Poecilia vivipara =

Southern molly

Species of livebearer fish

Poecilia vivipara, sometimes called the southern molly, is a small euryhaline livebearer fish distributed along the Atlantic coast of South America. It is most frequently found in standing brackish water. It has been introduced outside its native range to control mosquito populations and is occasionally kept in home aquariums.

== Taxonomy ==
P. vivipara belongs to the Poecilia subgenus of the genus Poecilia and is the type species of the genus. The species most closely related to it are P. parae and P. picta, which belong to the Micropoecilia subgenus.

== Description ==
P. vivipara is a small poeciliid, normally growing to a size of 2–5 cm. The maximum recorded total length is 7.8 cm. Individuals from habitats with higher water salinity tend to grow faster and larger, and these differences in growth patterns are partly heritable. A factor in the size difference between freshwater populations and other populations is the high level of predation to which freshwater populations are exposed; such correlation between body size and predation pressure is usual among livebearers.

Males do not exhibit bright color spots other than passing orange coloration in the throat region, which occurs more frequently in specimens from lagoon environments. Females are larger than males but the sexes do not otherwise differ as much as in the related common guppy, P. reticulata.

== Distribution ==
P. vivipara was originally described from Suriname. The species is presently known to be distributed from the delta of the Orinoco River in Venezuela through Brazil to Uruguay. P. vivipara is one of the most common fish species in Brazil's lagoon ecosystems. Whether the species's range extends south to Argentina, specifically the Río de la Plata region, is contentious.

P. vivipara may have been introduced to the Caribbean islands of Puerto Rico and Martinique. It is traditionally considered to have been introduced to Brazil's Fernando de Noronha archipelago to control mosquito larvae during the construction of the Second World War military bases but the species's ability to survive in saltwater makes it possible that the fish colonized the area naturally.

== Habitat ==
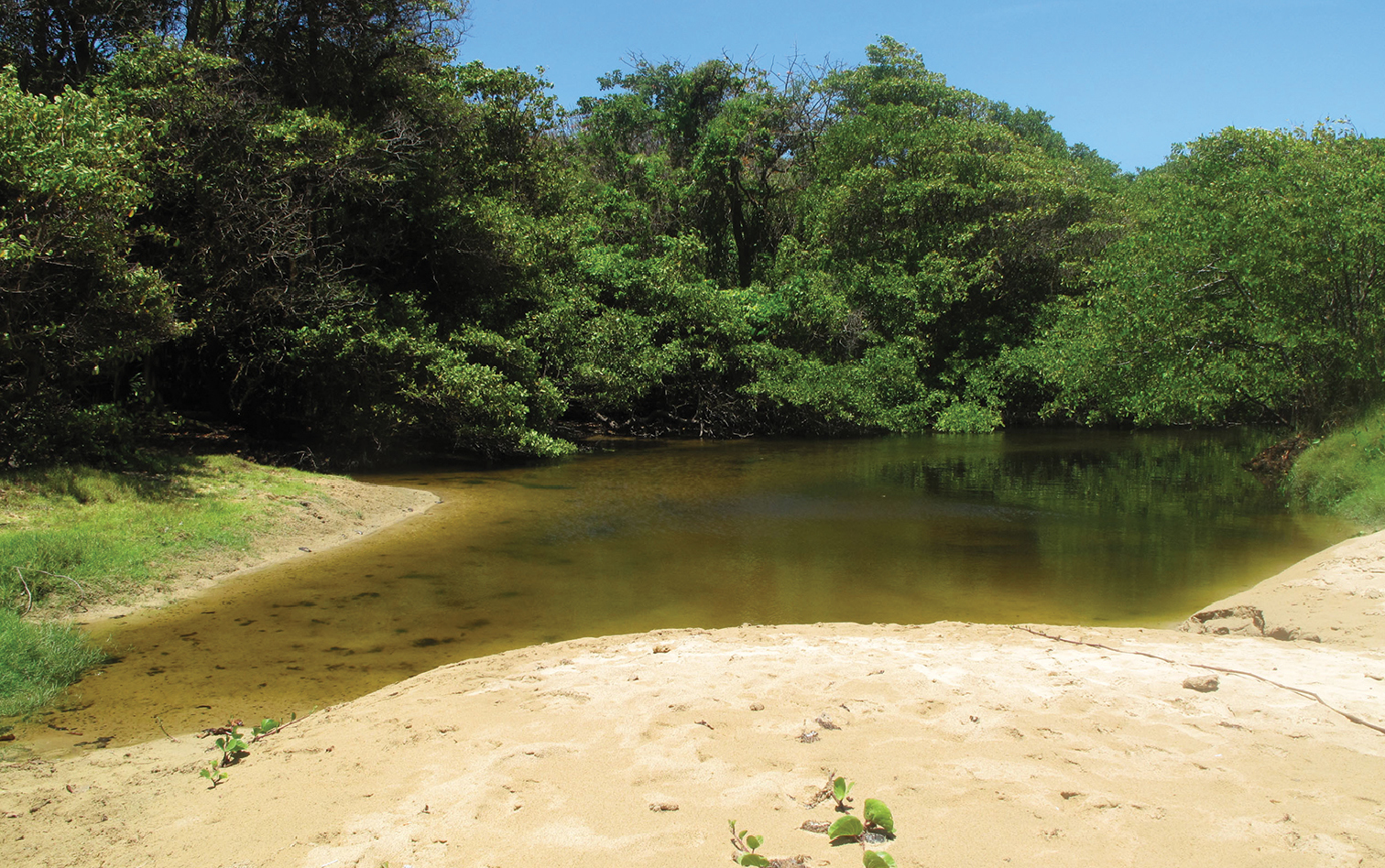
Habitat at Fernando de Noronha

P. vivipara mainly inhabits lentic (standing) waters such as canals and drainage ditches at the edges of swamps. It tolerates varying degrees of salinity, ranging from freshwater to hypersaline, but is most common in slightly brackish and rare in fresh water. It may be found in large shoals. Freshwater habitats tend to feature abundant marginal vegetation while aquatic plants are typically absent from saltwater sites. The species is highly tolerant of other environmental extremes as well, especially temperature, allowing it to occupy a variety of lentic habitats.

== Ecology ==
P. vivipara is omnivorous, feeding on diatoms, cyanobacteria, and invertebrates such as insect larvae. Due to preying on mosquito larvae, P. vivipara has been used to control mosquito populations in ponds and reservoirs.

P. vivipara may be parasitized by the metacercariae of Pygidiopsis macrostomum, Ascocotyle pindoramensis, A. diminuta, and Acanthocollaritrema umbilicatum. In the case of A. umbilicatum, P. vivipara acts as a second intermediate host, the first being the aquatic snail Heleobia australis. Heavily infected fish are lethargic and more easily fall prey to the common snook, Centropomus undecimalis, which is the parasite's definitive host.

In freshwater habitats the main predator of P. vivipara is Hoplias malabaricus; P. vivipara is one of the most common items in the latter fish's diet, especially of juveniles and subadults. Possible predators in brackish waters include cichlids Geophagus brasiliensis and Australoheros facetus, which have been observed preying on young but not adult P. vivipara in laboratory settings.

== Reproduction ==
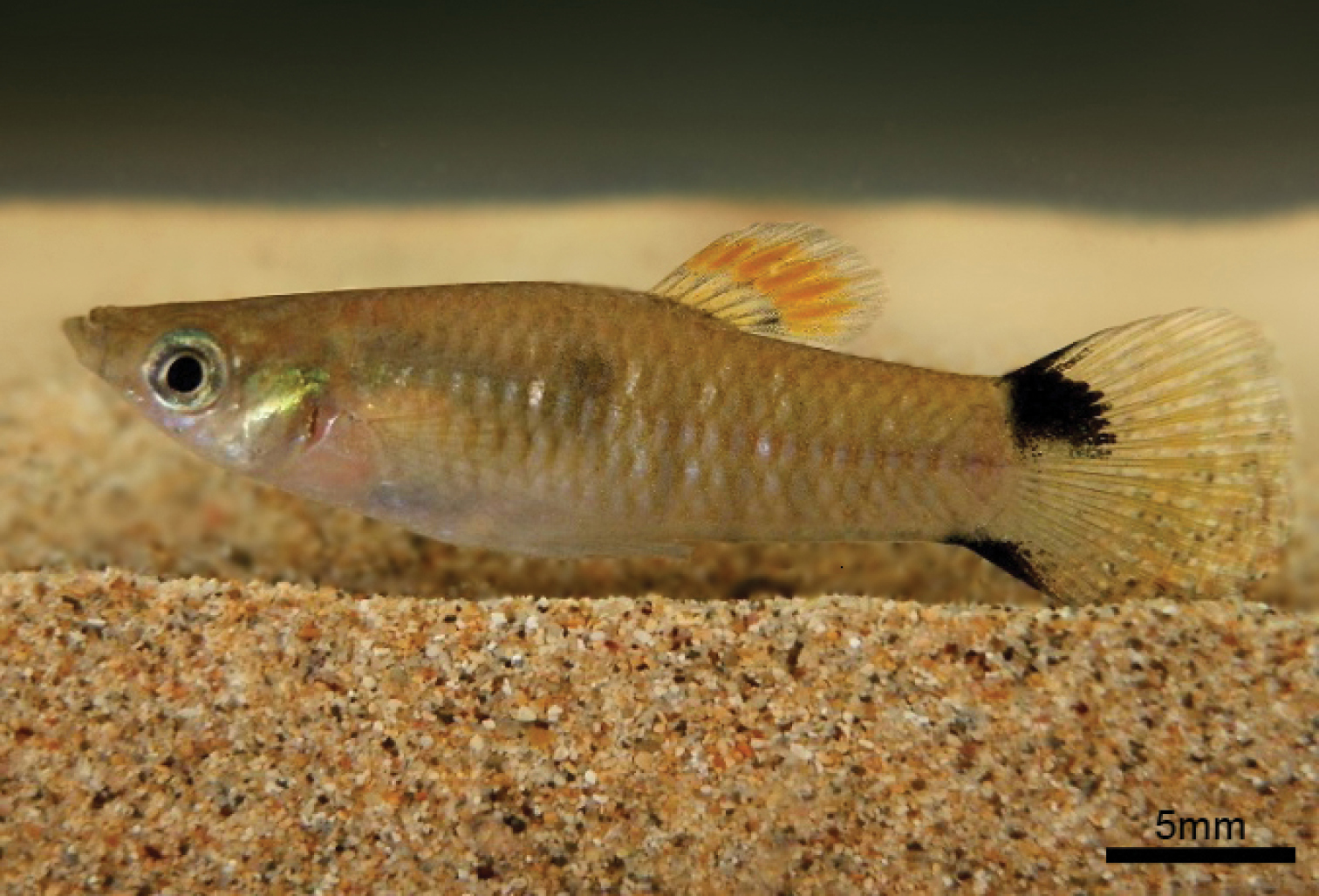
A male from Fernando de Noronha

Males are particularly lively and approach females not just of their own species but also of other Poeciliinae species. Unlike the common guppy, P. vivipara males rely on opportunistic (sneak and chase) matings rather than courtship displays. Due to this strategy, sexual selection favors smaller males.

P. vivipara is ovoviparous. The gestation lasts about 28 days. A female may normally deliver 6–10 fry, but the number may exceed 100. Larger females produce more young. The fry, which follow the mother for the first few hours, are approximately 6 mm long at birth. The fish reach sexual maturity at the age of 3–4 months.

== In aquarium ==
The species is peaceful and suitable for a community aquarium but it requires hard water and does best with a dose of salt and a soft bottom. It readily feeds on flake food, algae, and small live food.
