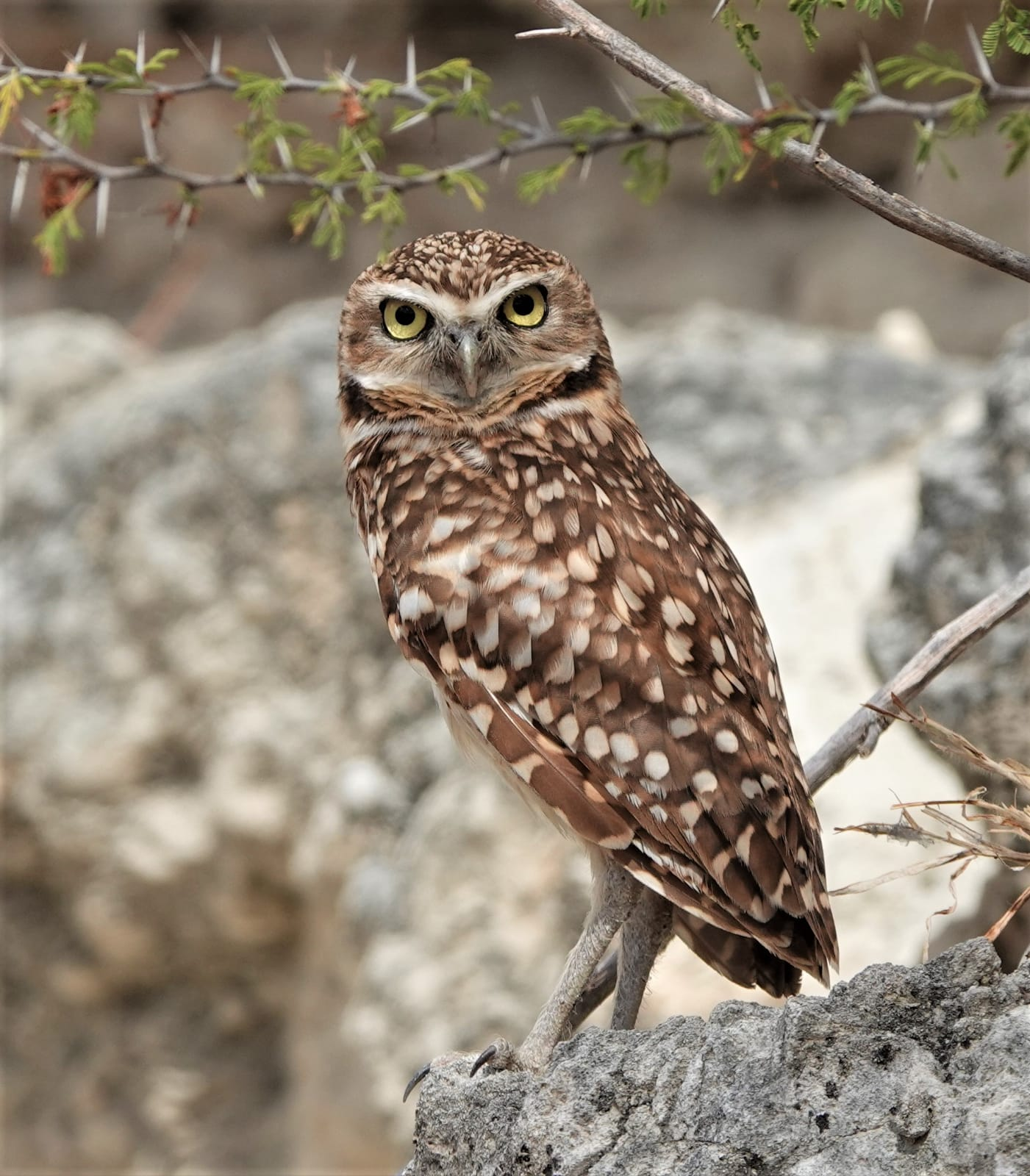

Scientific classification
- Kingdom: Animalia
- Phylum: Chordata
- Class: Aves
- Order: Strigiformes
- Family: Strigidae
- Genus: Athene
- Species: A. cunicularia
- Subspecies: A. c. arubensis

Trinomial name
- Athene cunicularia arubensis (Cory, 1915)

= Athene cunicularia arubensis =

Subspecies of birds

Athene cunicularia arubensis, also known as the Aruban burrowing owl or shoco, is an endemic subspecies of burrowing owl in Aruba. Since 2015, the shoco has become a national symbol of Aruba.

== Taxonomy ==
In the IOC World Bird List, the subspecies A. c. arubensis is no longer listed separately but has been merged with the subspecies A. c. brachyptera.

== Characteristics ==
The shoco has a head-to-tail length of 20 centimetres (7.9 in). Notable features include large round yellow eyes, prominent whitish eyebrows, absent ear tufts, and relatively long grey legs.

== Distribution ==
Based on behaviour and vocalisations, it is believed that the shoco is most likely a distinct and separate species of owl. Furthermore, it is suspected that the shoco has been present on Aruba for at least over one and a half million years. Aruba is the only country within the Kingdom of the Netherlands that has a burrowing owl.

== Habitat and status ==
The shoco lives in burrows on the ground in areas with low cactus vegetation and dry forests. If the shoco cannot find a burrow, it will dig one itself in soft ground. Since much of the life history of this subspecies is still unknown, the population is being monitored within the protected area of Arikok National Park.

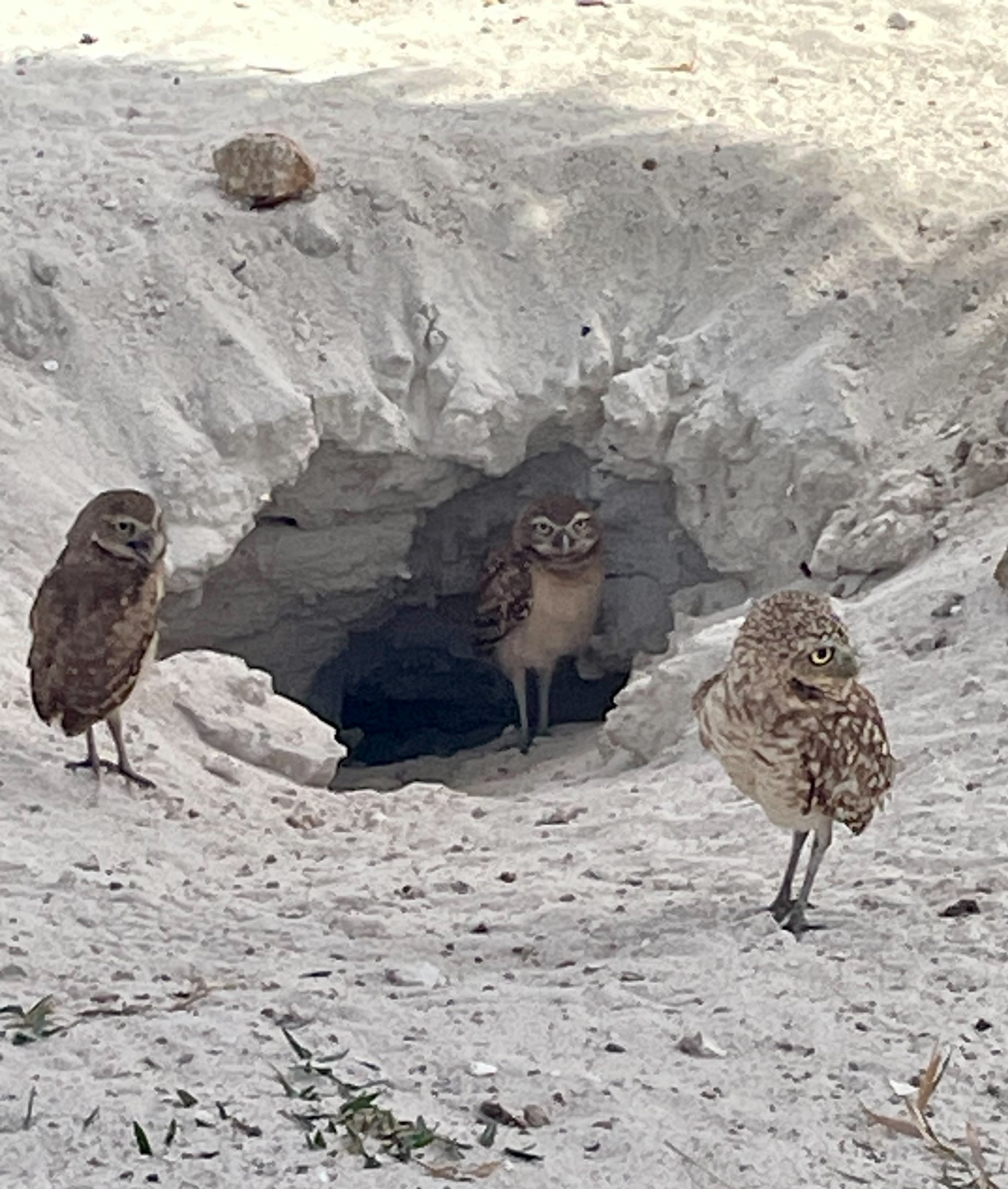
Burrow of the shoco on the beach next to Divi Tamarijn Hotel on Aruba

The shoco has been designated as an endangered species and enjoys legal protection. Despite its popularity, the well-being and survival of the burrowing owl are under great pressure. In the first two decades of the 21st century, the Aruban population grew, along with population density. With 636 persons per square kilometre in 2017, it even exceeded the density of the Netherlands. As a result, the habitat of the shoco is severely limited and fragmented. Furthermore, the unregulated and extreme increase in tourist off-road recreation, and the presence of the exotic boa constrictor pose a threat to the survival of the shoco. In 2013, the size of the population was estimated to be less than 200 breeding pairs.

== Breeding ==
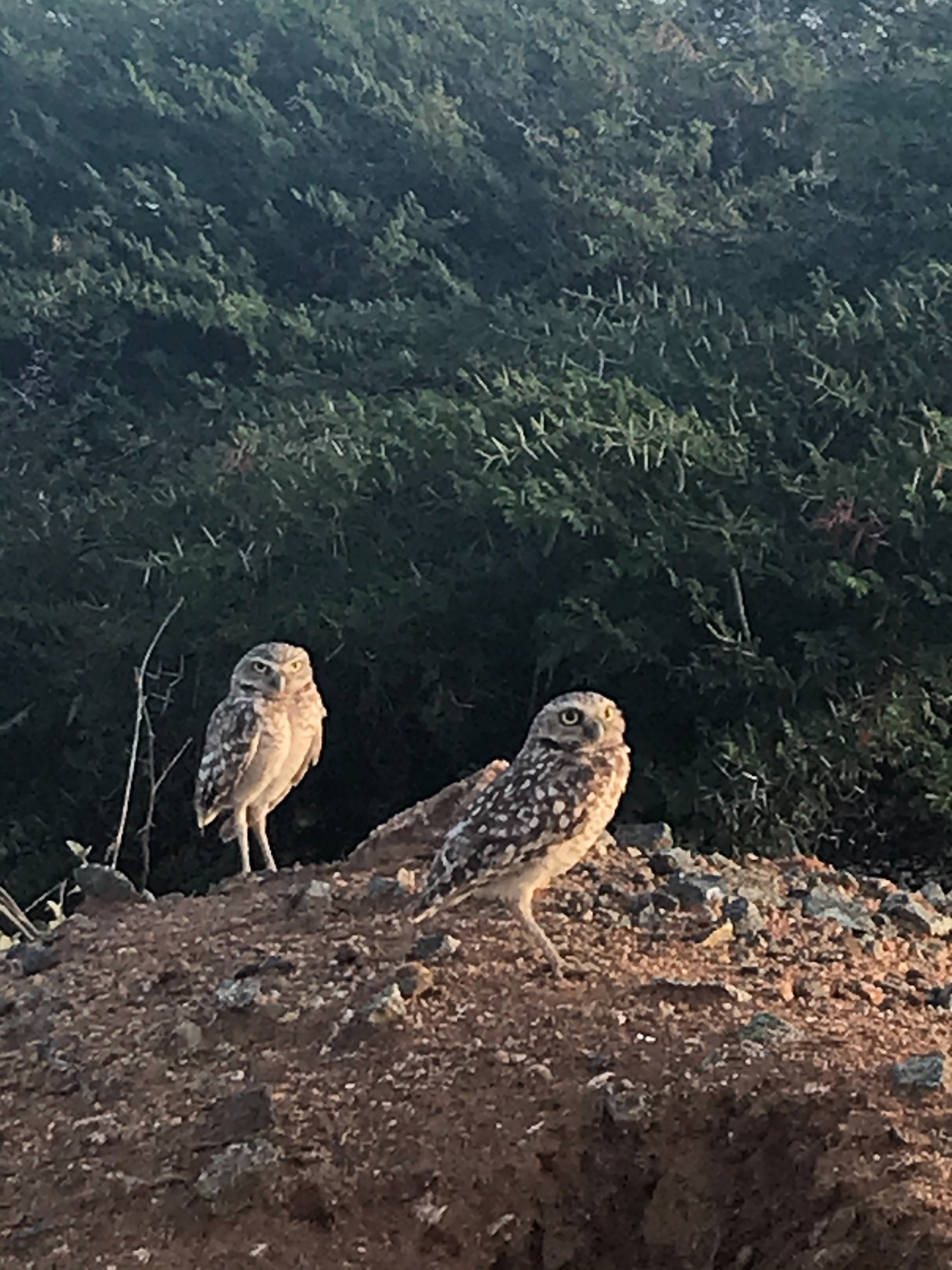
Shoco pair

The burrow also serves as a nesting site. The shoco lays 1 or 2 eggs every other day until all the eggs are laid. A shoco can lay up to 4 eggs, which are incubated for 3–4 weeks. The young owlets are cared for 3 months until they leave the nest. Burrowing owls typically lay three to six eggs, which are incubated for 28 days and hatch after 42 days. It is unclear whether this also applies to the shoco.

== Diet ==
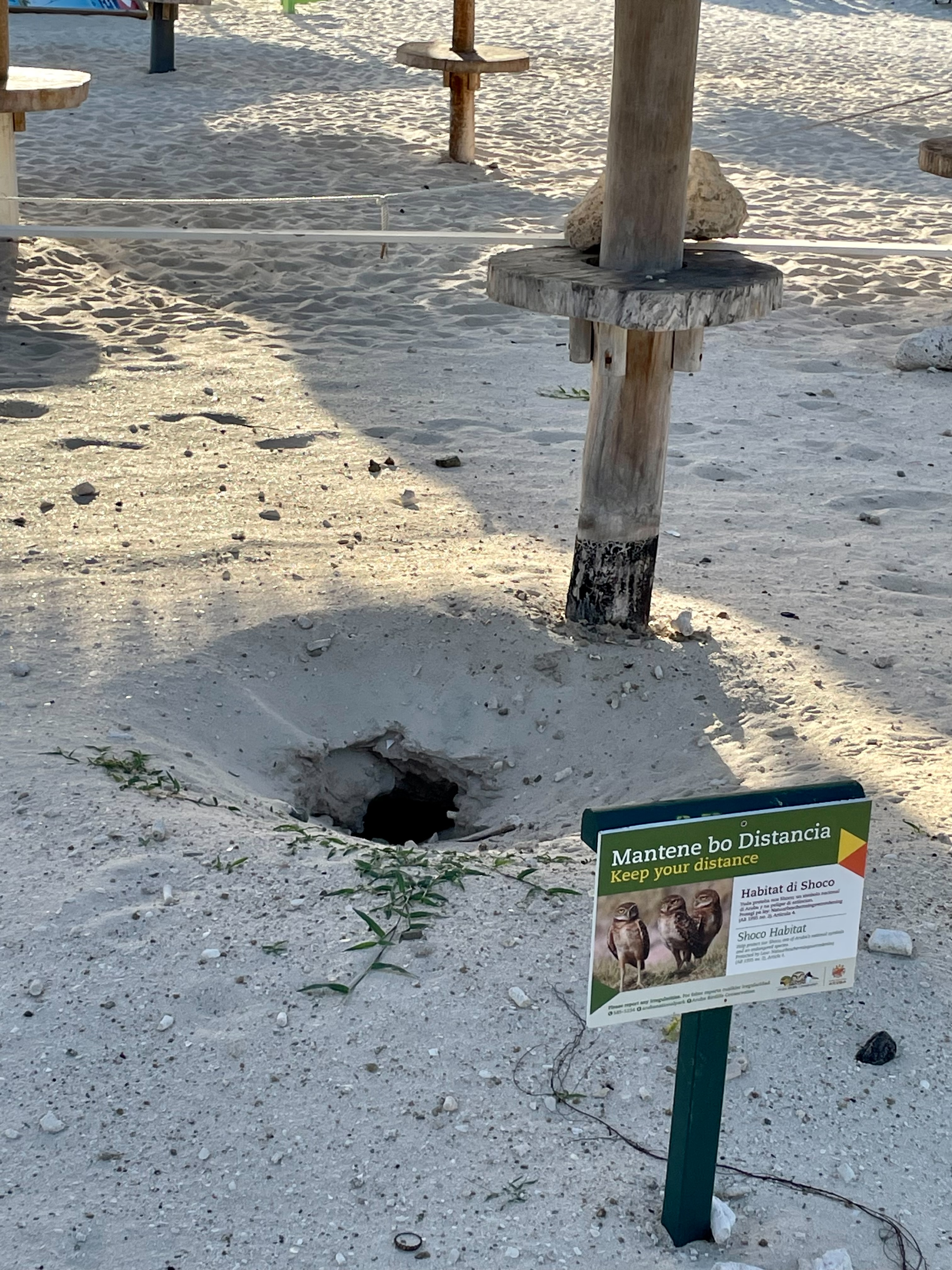
Warning sign to protect a burrow on the beach

The diet primarily consists of mice, lizards, and large insects, including beetles and grasshoppers. From there, it begins its hunt from the ground, walking, hopping, or running. It also hunts for prey from a high perch and captures it with its feet. The shoco is active during the day but becomes more active in hunting during the late afternoon and evening. These owls have excellent vision in the dark and possess keen hearing abilities.

== National symbol ==
The shoco is the native species most associated with Aruba. It is an integral part of the local culture and has traditionally served as a symbol of wisdom and knowledge. In 2015, the shoco was officially designated as the national symbol of Aruba, although it had been fulfilling this role since 2012. Since 2017, Aruba also has a national bird: the prikichi or brown-throated parakeet (Eupsittula pertinax arubensis). Out of the 270 bird species registered for Aruba, these two are found exclusively on the island.

The image of the shoco is well known in Aruba. In 1990, a series of banknotes featuring animals was put into circulation, including the 50 Aruban florin banknote with an image of the shoco. In 1994, four postage stamps were issued depicting the shoco and the emblem of the World Wildlife Fund. In 2012, the Central Bank of Aruba issued a commemorative silver 5-florin coin featuring the Aruban shoco. The coin was equipped with augmented reality by the Royal Dutch Mint, allowing people to scan the coin with a smartphone to access additional information about the coin and the shoco. Additionally, two children's books have been published in which the shoco plays the main role: Shon Shoco weet raad ("Mr. Shoco knows best") (2005) by Jacques Thönissen and De roep van de shoco / E grito di e shoco ("The call of the shoco") (2014) by Charlotte Doornhein. The latter is a bilingual gift book specially written for the Aruban Children's Festival.
