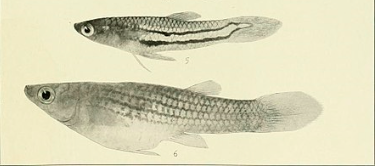
- male and female

Scientific classification
- Kingdom: Animalia
- Phylum: Chordata
- Class: Actinopterygii
- Order: Cyprinodontiformes
- Family: Poeciliidae
- Genus: Poecilia
- Species: P. parae

Binomial name
- Poecilia parae C. H. Eigenmann, 1894

Synonyms
- Micropoecilia parae (Eigenmann, 1894); Poecilia amazonica Garman, 1895; Micropoecilia amazonica (Garman, 1895); Acanthophacelus melanzonus Eigenmann, 1909; Micropoecilia melanzona (Eigenmann, 1909); Poecilia melanzona (Eigenmann, 1909)

= Poecilia parae =

Species of fish

Poecilia parae, also known as the melanzona guppy, is a species of fish from the family Poeciliidae which is found in northern South America from Guyana to the mouth of the Amazon River.

== Colour polymorphism ==
Poecilia parae are known to have a number of colour morphs in the males, at least five distinct morphs are known, while there is a single female colour form. The colour of the male is linked to the Y-chromosome. Some of the morphs are always abundant in the wild, and others are invariably rare leading to the conclusion that the colour of the males has implications for their fitness. Laboratory work has shown that the most frequent morph is also the most reproductively successful morph. However, when the females were given the choice between two different males they preferred the rare morph males over the common morph males. This suggests that there are alternative male mating strategies involved such as sperm competition and overt male-male competition, among other possible factors, which override the preferences of the female fishes.

== Habitat and biology ==
Poecilia parae is found in estuaries in areas of both fresh and brackish water. It inhabits small swamps and shallow, slow-flowing creeks located inland with very fresh water. It is also found along riverine vegetation where there is clear water and a bed of mixed sand and mud. They are an ovoviviparous species and the females give birth to 5 to 15 live young after a gestation period of 24 days.

== Species description and taxonomy ==
Poecilia parae was described by Carl H. Eigenmann in 1894 as a subspecies of P. vivipara, Poecilia vivipara parae, with the type locality given as "Ditches of Rua das Mongubas of Pará, Brazil". Carl Leavitt Hubbs used this species as the type species of the subgenus Micropoecilia, which Fishbase recognises as a genus but does not include this species in it. Other workers support the monophyly of the genus Poecilia sensu lato with a number of subgenera, including Micropoecilia with P. (Micropoecilia) parae as the type species. Eigenmann used the specific name parae in reference to the Brazilian state of Pará, where the type was collected.

== Aquaria ==
Poecilia parae, especially the form melanozona, is a popular fish in the aquarium trade.
