= Dos Pos, Bonaire, Important Bird Area =

Important Bird Area on Bonaire in the Dutch Caribbean

Coordinates: 12°14′14″N 68°21′17″W

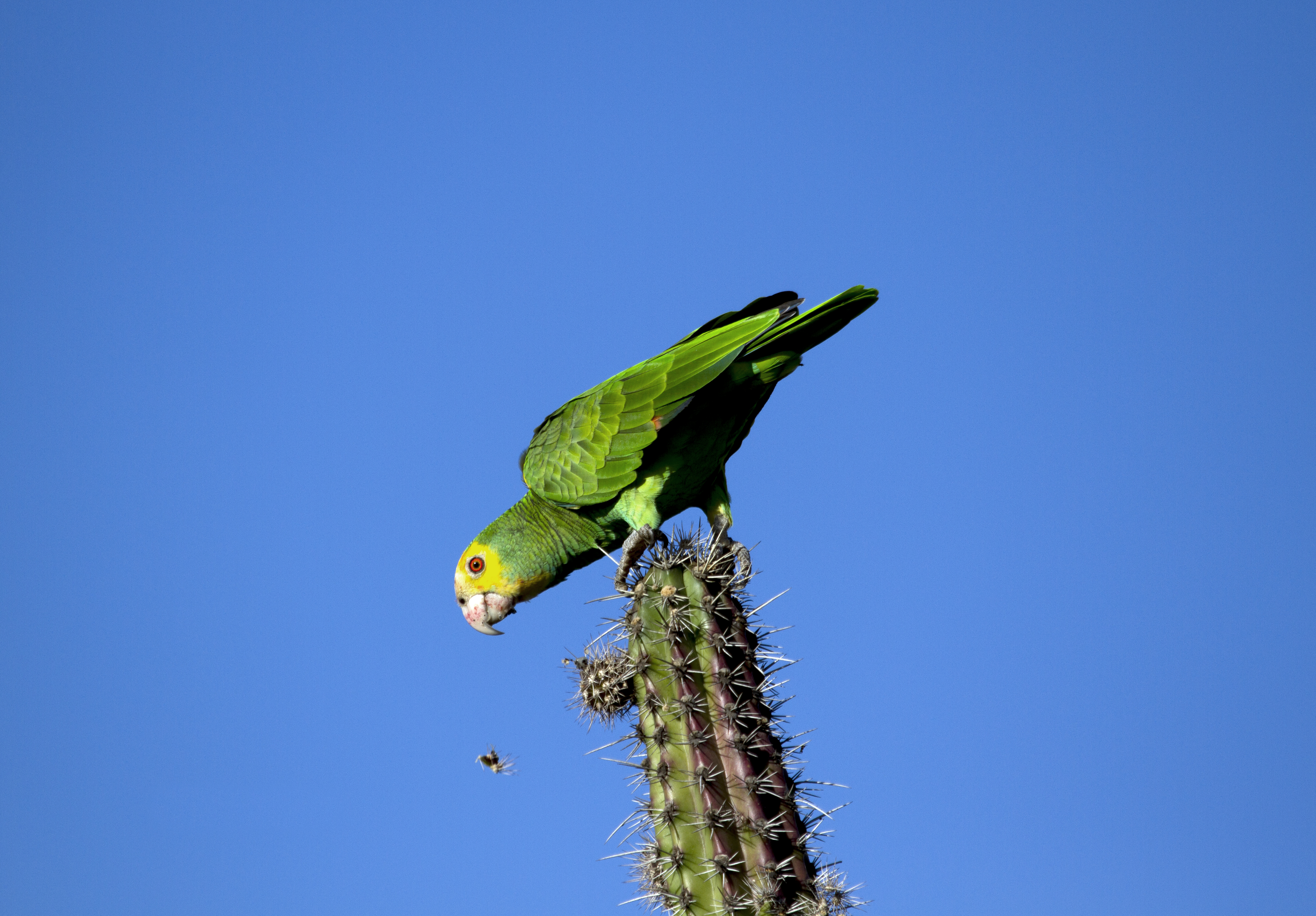
The IBA is an important winter roost site for yellow-shouldered amazons

The Dos Pos Important Bird Area lies on the leeward side of the northern end of the island of Bonaire in the Caribbean Netherlands. It is a 234 ha former fruit plantation, adjacent to the Washington Slagbaai National Park, that has been identified by BirdLife International as an Important Bird Area (IBA) because it supports populations of several threatened or restricted-range bird species. The landscape is one of small hills and sheltered valleys with remnant fruit trees, mainly mangoes, and a small ephemeral pond. Threats to the unprotected site are habitat degradation by feral donkeys, goats and pigs, predation by introduced cats and rats, and poaching for the pet trade.

== Birds ==
Birds for which the IBA was designated include bare-eyed pigeons, Caribbean elaenias, pearly-eyed thrashers and yellow-shouldered amazon parrots. In winter some 40% of the island's parrot population (of about 650 birds) roosts in the IBA. It is also a valuable location for migrating passerines, including blackburnian warblers, summer and scarlet tanagers, and rose-breasted grosbeaks, while peregrine falcons and merlins are frequent winter visitors. Caribbean coots and least grebes have bred on the pond.
