= Geology of Sint Eustatius =

Sint Eustatius is a volcanic arc island built upon submerged limestone, punctuated by explosive events of The Quill. Volcanism, tectonic uplift, and marine development continues to shape both land and sea in the region.

== Origins ==
Sint Eustatius is a young volcanic island of about 21 km^{2} (8.1 sq mi) located in the northern Lesser Antilles. It is formed by two distinct regions. The Northern-western hills, whose central crater is situated above the Bergje hill at 223 m (732 ft). was developed by erosion during the late Pliocene to early Pleistocene yielding pyroxene-andesite hills of up to 289 m (948 ft) height. The original crater might have been higher, but subsequent erosion reduced the height. The central feature, The Quill, emerged with rhyolitic eruptions about 32,000–22,000 years ago, producing a 760 m (2,490 ft)-wide crater. Later pyroclastic layers were formed with the latest activity recorded activity happening before 600 CE. Based on studies, the volcano has been erupting roughly once in 1,400 years for the past 22,000 years. The crater on the top, and the foot of the volcano consist of loose material from the eruption, with the rocks on the rim and bottom of the crater formed by older pyroxene-andesites and basalt.

== Substrate and tectonics ==
The island overlays a lithified shallow-water limestone base known as the Sugar Loaf–White Wall Formation, uplifted by volcanic activity. The island, which is part of the Lesser Antilles volcanic arc, is being continually shaped by the tectonic movement of North American Plate being subducted beneath the Caribbean Plate. The surrounding reefs have coral development atop volcanic substrates, influencing the ecology of the region. Most reefs have formed on large rocks that were thrown out during the volcanic eruption, and was later covered with algae.
