= Washington Slagbaai National Park =

National park on Bonaire Island in the Caribbean

- Washington-Slagbaai (Bonaire)
- IUCN category II (national park)
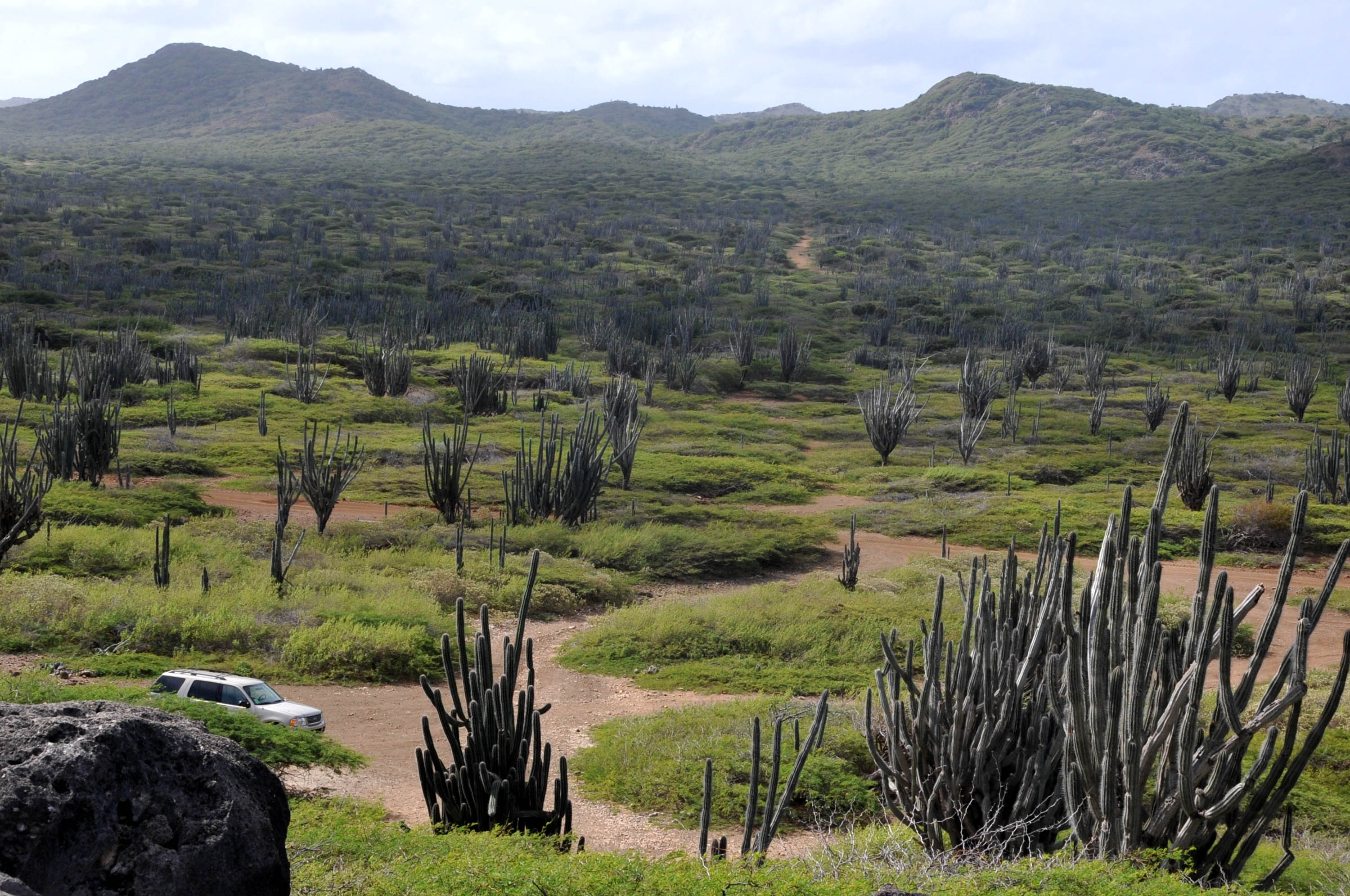
- View from the Malmok lighthouse

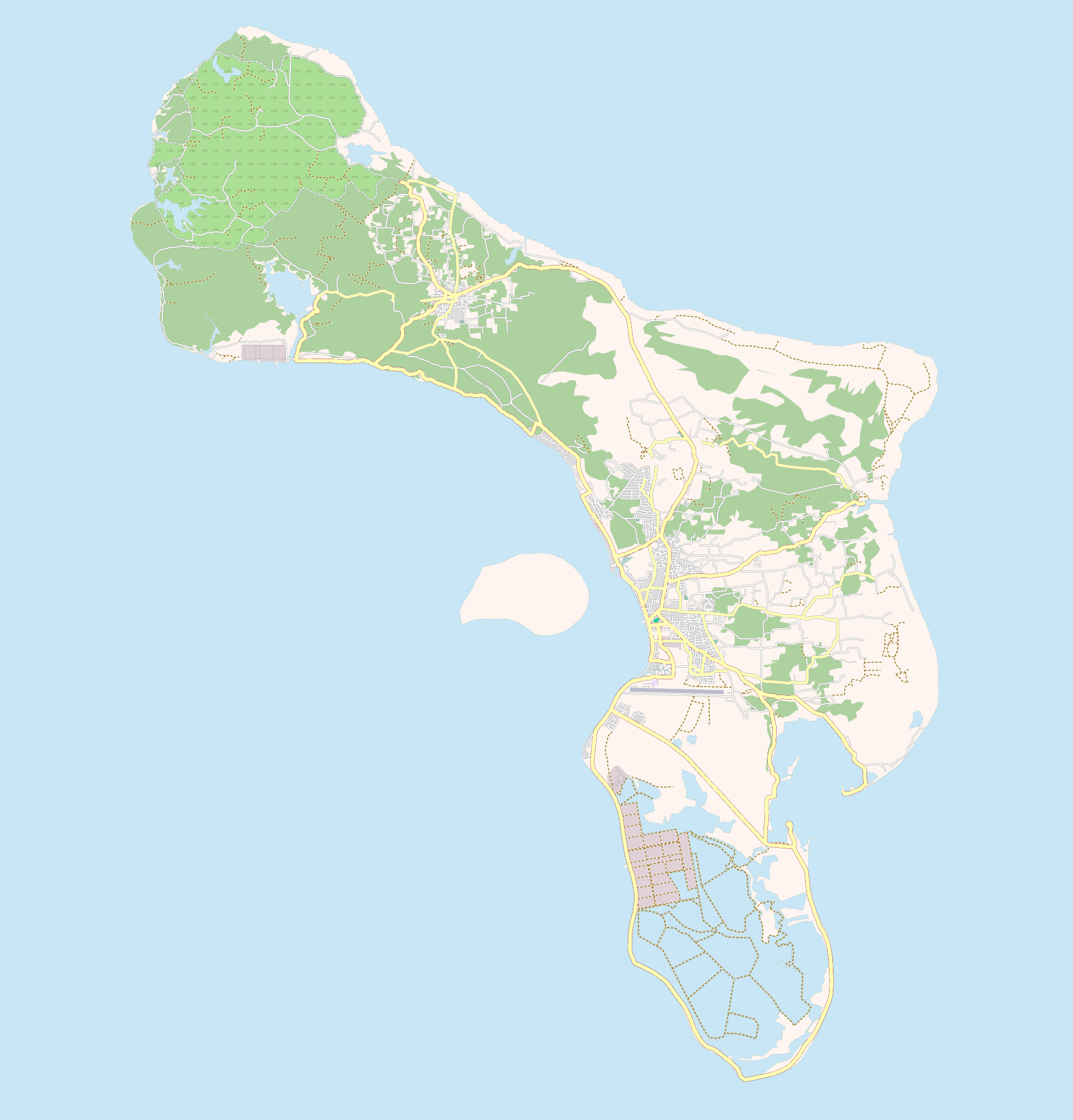
- Location within Bonaire Location within ABC islands (Lesser Antilles) Location within the Caribbean
- Location: Bonaire, Caribbean Netherlands
- Nearest town: Rincon
- Coordinates: 12.272°N 68.383°W
- Area: 59 km^{2} (23 sq mi)
- Max. elevation: 241 m, Mount Brandaris
- Established: 1969
- Operator: STINAPA Bonaire
- Website: stinapabonaire.org/washington-slagbaai/

Washington Slagbaai National Park is a national park and ecological reserve on the northwestern part of the island of Bonaire in the Caribbean Netherlands. The 5,643 hectares (21.79 sq mi) park covering approximately a fifth of the island of Bonaire is managed by STINAPA Bonaire, a non-profit foundation, on behalf of the Bonaire government. Established in 1969, Washington Slagbaai National Park was the first nature reserve to be established in the former Netherlands Antilles.

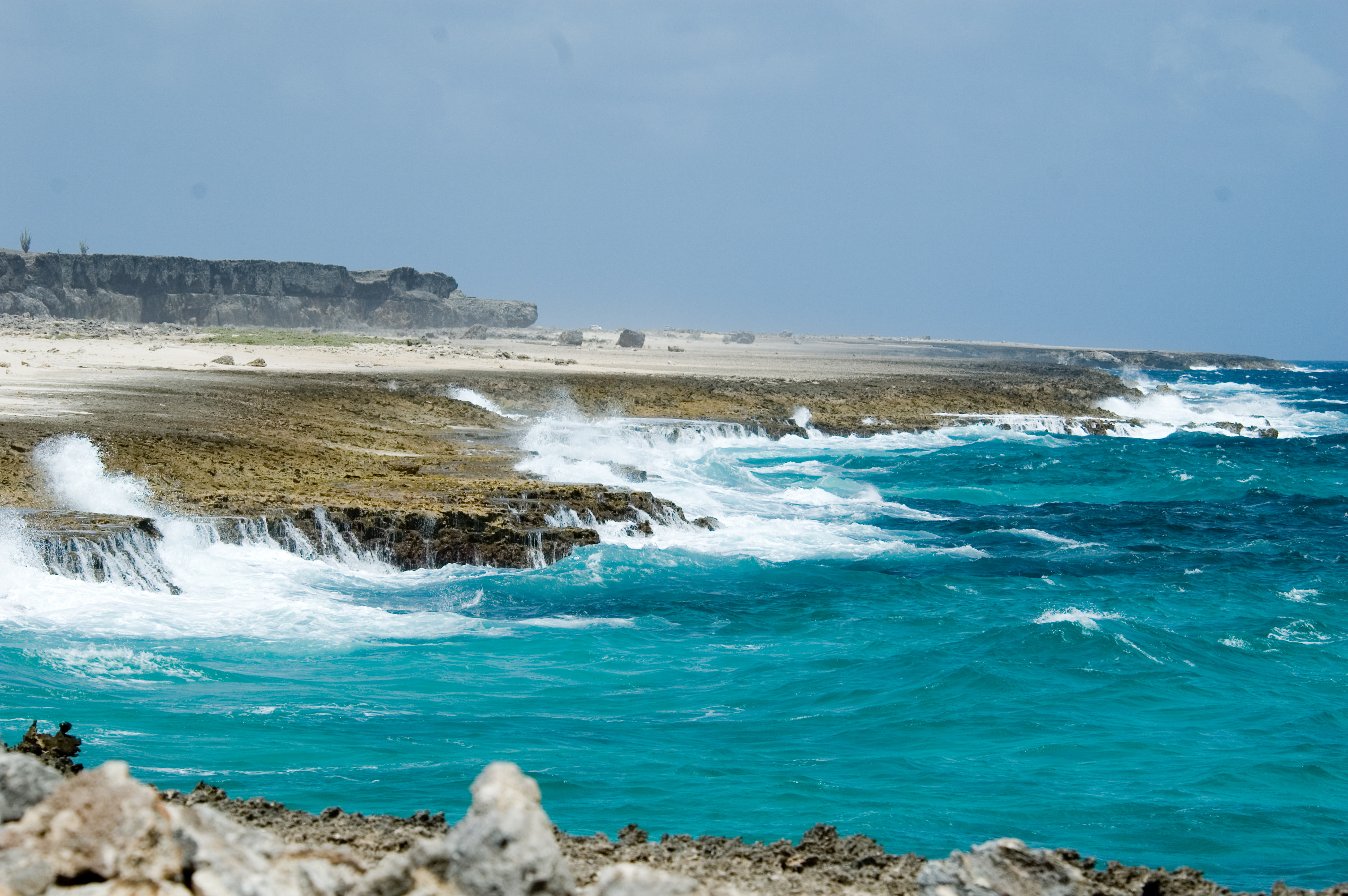
Coastal part of the national park

== Flora and fauna ==
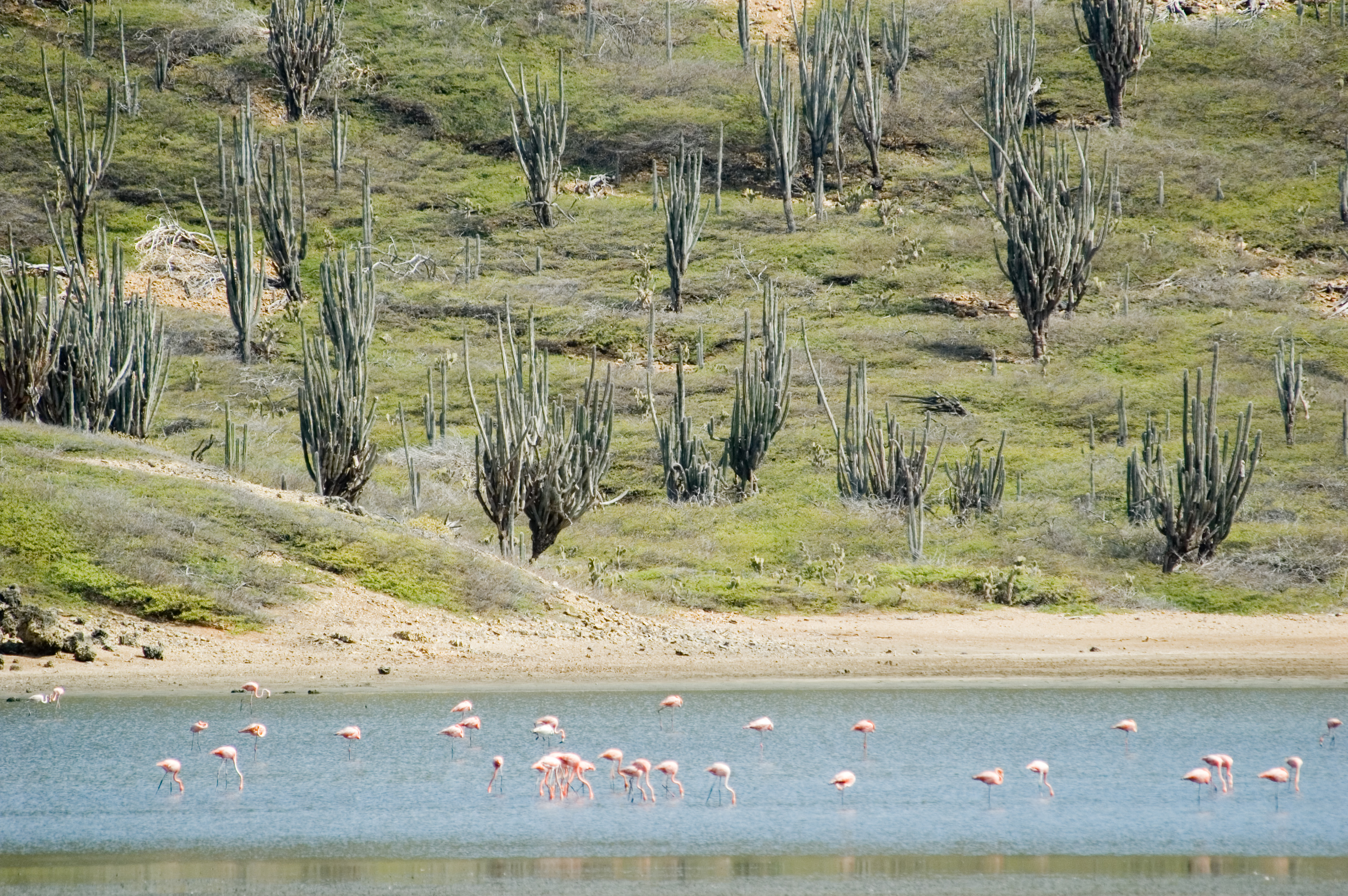
Flamingos in the pond

The park hosts about 340 species of plants. Typical vegetation is made up of low thorny scrub (xerophytic shrublands) and two main species of cacti: the yatu (Lemaireocereus griseus) and the cadushi (in Wayuunaiki) or kadushi (Cereus repandus).

Park seashores are nesting ground for endangered sea turtles: the green turtle (Chelonia mydas), the hawksbill (Eretmochelys imbricata) and the loggerhead sea turtle (Caretta caretta). On rare occasions one can see leatherback sea turtles (Dermochelys coriacea).

The park is also an Important Bird Area (IBA) since it serves as nesting, roosting, and foraging area for endangered or restricted-range bird species.

The salt pans are a special area and home to the Caribbean flamingo (Phoenicopterus ruber). The Pekelmeer Flamingo Sanctuary is set in mud pockets.

Specially protected parrot species include the yellow-shouldered parrot (Amazona barbadensis). The chance for the chicks to survive in the nest is very small. Rats, wild cats and other birds eat the eggs, but the biggest danger is humans. They take the chicks out of their nests to sell them. Trade is now prohibited by an international convention (CITES). Since 2008, the population has increased.

The park is also nesting grounds for endangered common terns (Sterna hirundo), Sandwich terns (Sterna sandvicensis) and least terns (Sterna antillarum).

== See also ==
- Bonaire National Marine Park
- List of birds of Bonaire
