= Mount Brandaris =

Highest point of Bonaire

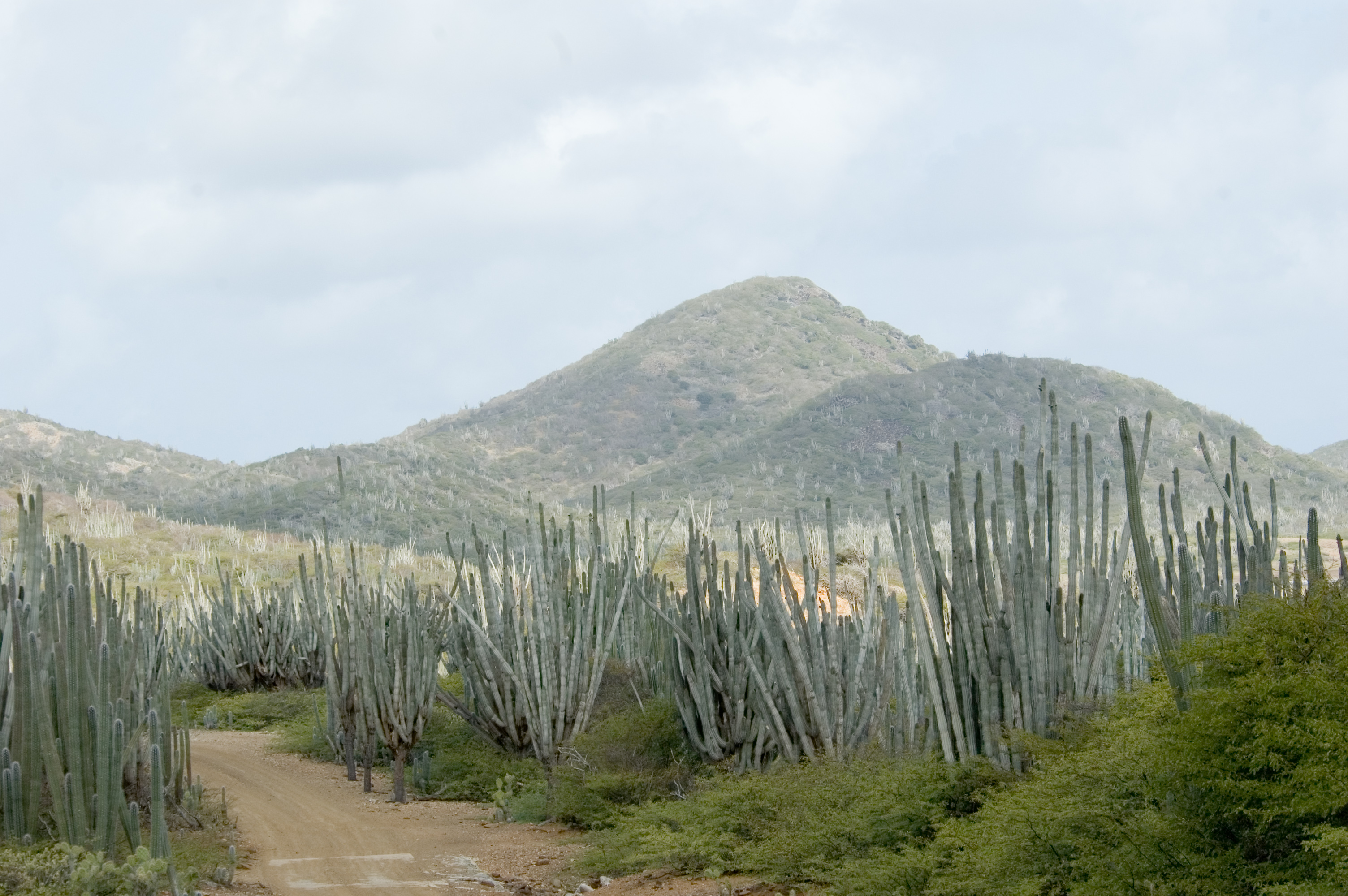
- A view of the mountain

Highest point
- Peak: 241 metres (791 ft)
- Prominence: 241 m (791 ft)
- Coordinates: 12°16′00″N 68°23′00″W

Geography
- Location: Bonaire
- Country: The Netherlands

Mount Brandaris, or Brandaris, is a hill that is the highest point on the island of Bonaire, a special municipality of the Netherlands in the southern Caribbean Sea.

The hill is 241 metres (791 ft) tall. It is located within the northern part of Washington Slagbaai National Park. This park covers almost the entire north-western portion of Bonaire and is administered by Stinapa, a non-governmental organization that administers the national parks in Bonaire.
