= STENAPA =

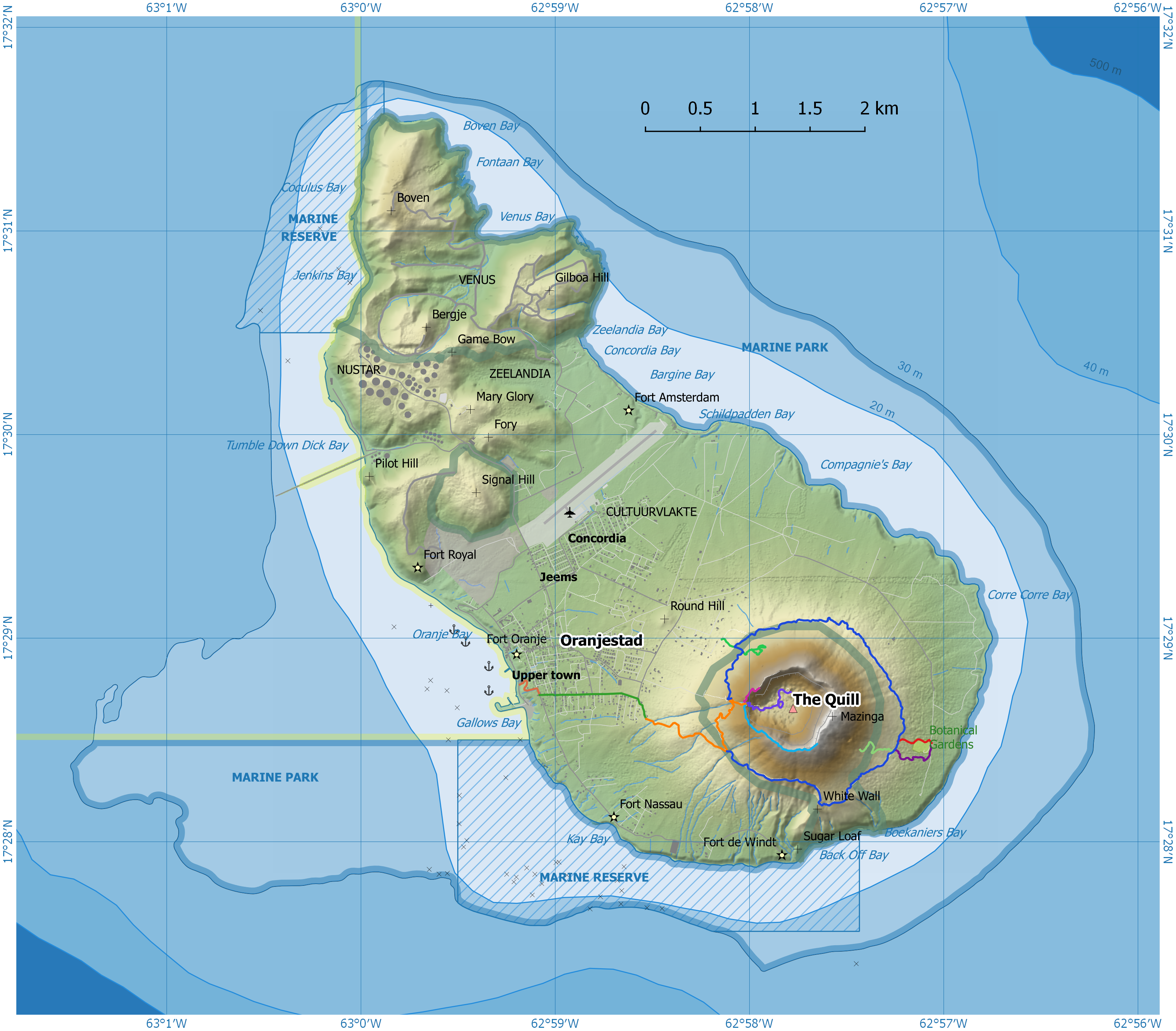
Map of Sint Eustatius showing the locations of the national parks

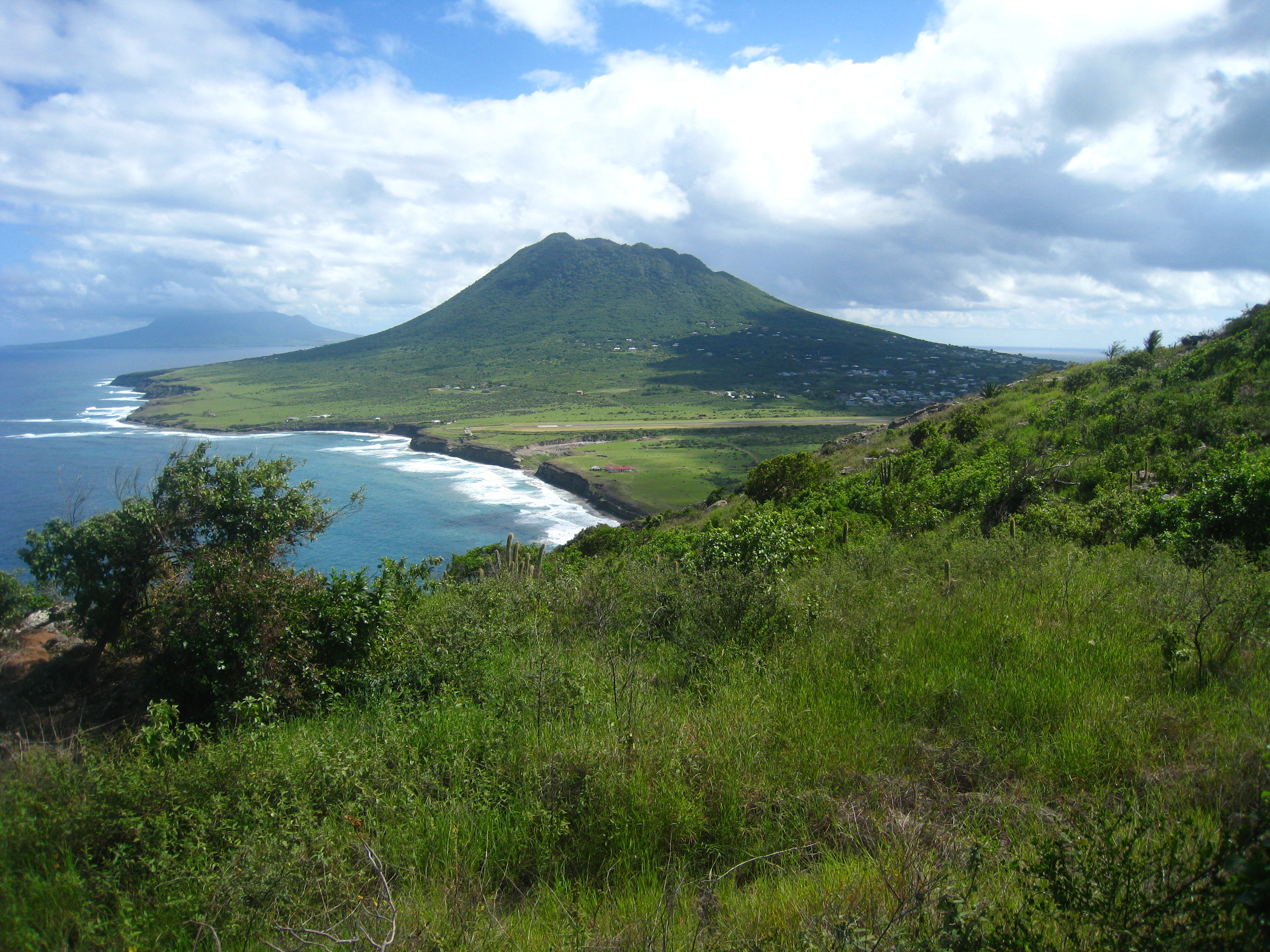
The Atlantic coast of St. Eustatius, including a distant view of The Quill, one of the Parks managed by STENAPA, as viewed from the northern part of the island. The surrounding ocean area all around the island down to 30 metres (98 ft) in depth comprises another park, the National Marine Park. The island of St. Kitts is dimly visible in the upper left of the image.

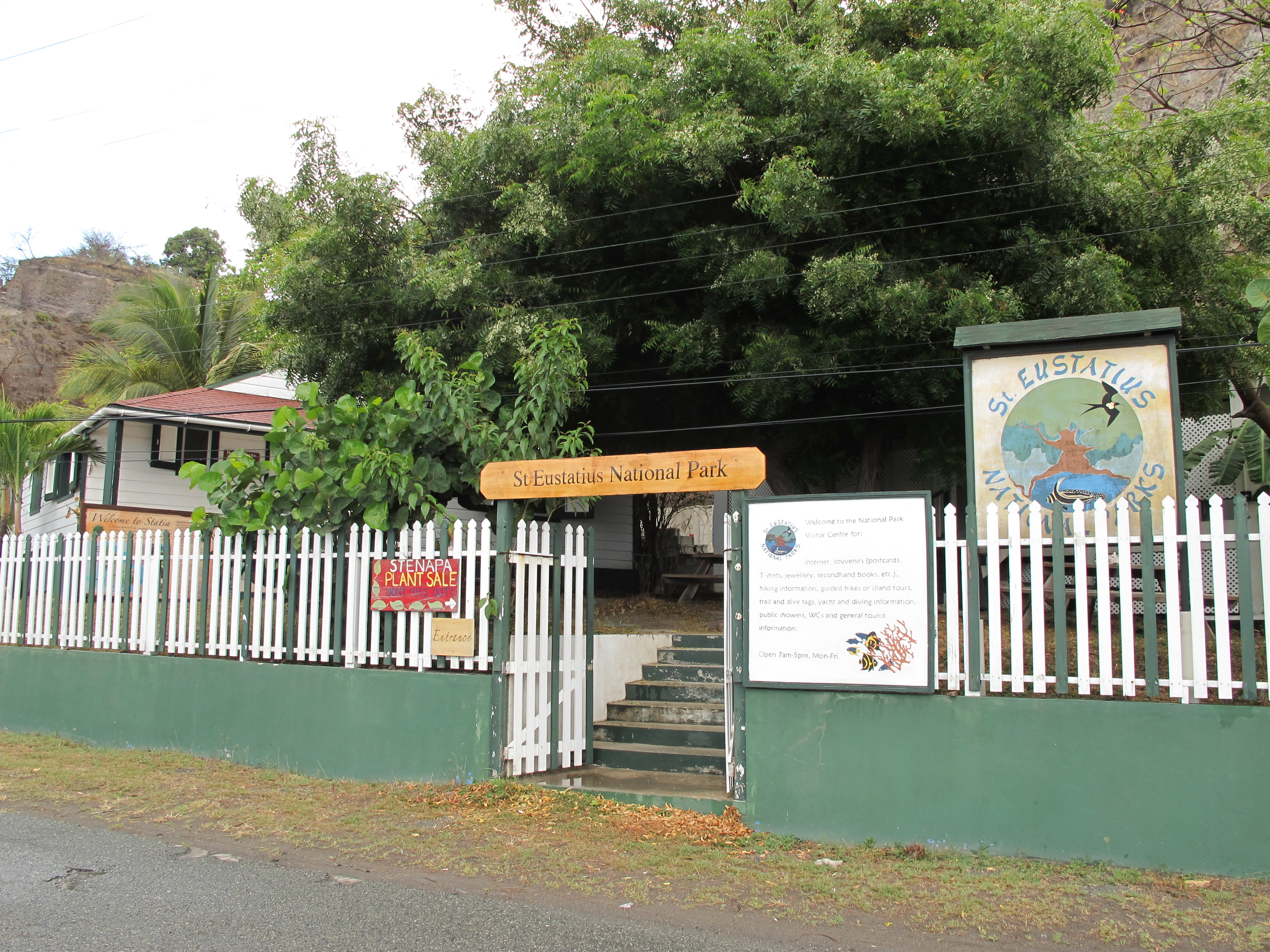
The headquarters of STENAPA in Lower Town, St. Eustatius, 2010

STENAPA (an acronym for St. Eustatius National Parks) is the national parks organisation of Sint Eustatius, a small Dutch island in the Caribbean. The island is situated within the inner arc of the Leeward Island chain of the Lesser Antilles, West Indies. Sint Eustatius is south of the island of Saba and north of the island of Saint Kitts. The island of St. Eustatius is now part of the country of the Netherlands, as a bijzondere gemeente or "special municipality".

STENAPA is a non-profit, non-governmental foundation (in Dutch a stichting) which was founded in 1988, and registered in 1995. The function of this foundation is environmental protection. STENAPA currently manages the National Marine Park, the Quill / Boven National Park, and the Botanical Garden. STENAPA is one of the members of the Dutch Caribbean Nature Alliance.

The headquarters, the National Parks Office and Visitor Centre, is situated next to the harbour in Lower Town, which is the waterfront part of the capital Oranjestad, most of which is higher up, on top of a cliff. The more southerly part of Lower Town faces onto Gallows Bay, on the western or Caribbean Sea coast of the island.

== The National Parks ==
This non-profit foundation is responsible for the management of three parks. Two parks are on the land surface of the island; the remaining park is marine and surrounds the island. The combined area of the parks is 33 km^{2} (13 sq mi).

- The St. Eustatius National Marine Park surrounds the island from the high-water mark down to 30 metres (98 ft) depth, and also encompasses two Marine Park Reserves.
- The Quill / Boven National Park comprises two different areas or subsectors. One is the dormant stratovolcano known as the Quill, which is in the southern part of the island. The other area is a group of five hills in the northern part of the island: Bergje, Boven (the highest of the five), Venus, Gilboa Hill and Signal Hill. These five hills are the remnants of another stratovolcano.
- The Miriam C. Schmidt Botanical Garden was started in 1998. The main emphasis is on species that are or were native to the island and the surrounding islands. There is also an experimental area where researchers are studying methods of controlling the problematic invasive species Antigonon leptopus, the corallita vine.

== Staff ==
STENAPA is governed by a board. The board members do not receive any wages. The foundation employs eight staff members who administer the foundation and manage the parks. The staff members work with interns and volunteers from the island or abroad.
