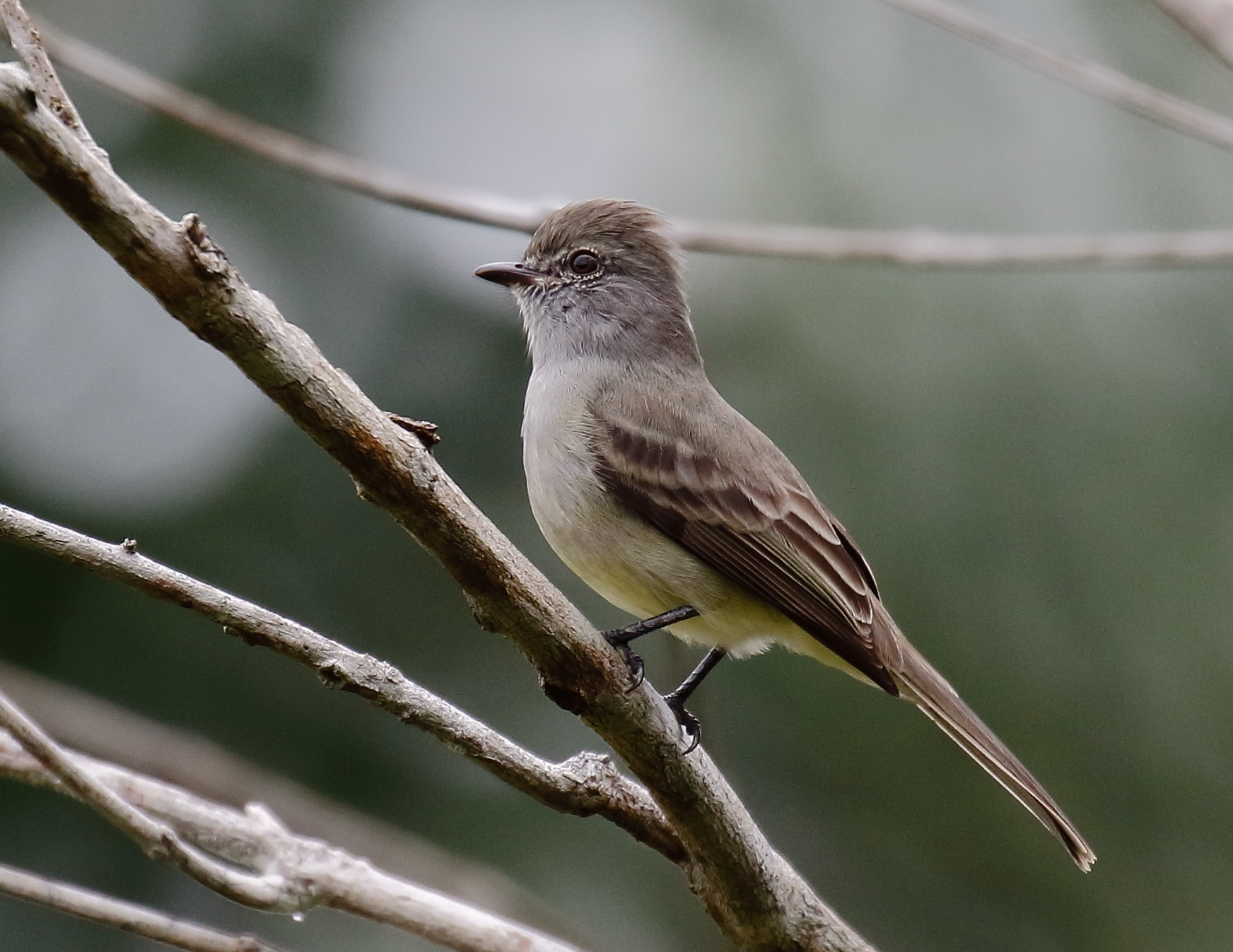
- Amazonian scrub flycatcher at Presidente Figueiredo, Amazonas state, Brazil

Conservation status
- Least Concern (IUCN 3.1)

Scientific classification
- Kingdom: Animalia
- Phylum: Chordata
- Class: Aves
- Order: Passeriformes
- Family: Tyrannidae
- Genus: Sublegatus
- Species: S. obscurior

Binomial name
- Sublegatus obscurior Todd, 1920

= Amazonian scrub flycatcher =

Species of bird

The Amazonian scrub flycatcher or Todd's scrub flycatcher (Sublegatus obscurior) is a species of bird in the family Tyrannidae, the tyrant flycatchers. It is found in every mainland South American country except Argentina, Chile, Paraguay, and Uruguay.

== Taxonomy and systematics ==
What are now the Amazonian scrub flycatcher, northern scrub flycatcher (S. arenarum), and southern scrub flycatcher (S. modestus) were previously members of the single species named scrub flycatcher with the binomial S. modestus. The further taxonomy of the three scrub flycatchers has not been fully resolved.

As of late 2024, the Amazonian scrub flycatcher was considered monotypic. At least one author has treated it as a subspecies of S. modestus, calling the combined species the "forest scrub flycatcher". Others have treated it as a subspecies of what is now the glaber subspecies of the northern scrub flycatcher but that they considered to be a separate species.

== Description ==
The Amazonian scrub flycatcher is 14 to 15 cm (5.5 to 5.9 in) long and weighs 14.5 to 17 g (0.51 to 0.60 oz). The sexes have the same plumage. Adults have a dark grayish brown crown that sometimes erects as a shaggy crest. Their face is mostly whitish to pale gray with a faint pale supercilium, a dark line through the eye, and a darker gray to the back of the ear coverts. Their back and rump are dark grayish brown. Their wings are dusky gray with paler grayish to whitish edges on the flight feathers and tips of the wing coverts; the latter show as two wing bars. Their tail is dusky. Their chin, throat and upper breast are dark dusky gray and their belly dingy yellow with no sharp demarcation between the colors. They have a dark brown iris, a stubby black bill, and gray legs and feet.

== Distribution and habitat ==
The Amazonian scrub flycatcher is primarily a bird of the Amazon Basin whose range extends slightly into the upper reaches of the Orinoco River basin. It is found from southeastern Colombia south through eastern Ecuador and Peru into northern Bolivia and east from there through southern Venezuela, the Guianas, and Amazonian Brazil to the Atlantic. Its southernmost extent in Brazil is northern Mato Grosso. It inhabits clearings and edges of dryish forest and woodlands and also occurs along watercourses in more open savanna. It favors low shrubby vegetation in all landscapes, and typically is found in dryer habitats than the other two scrub flycatchers. In elevation it occurs from sea level to about 450 m (1,500 ft) in the Guianas and Brazil and up to 500 m (1,600 ft) in Colombia, 900 m (3,000 ft) in Ecuador, 1,000 m (3,300 ft) in Peru, and 460 m (1,500 ft) in Venezuela.

== Behavior ==
=== Movement ===
The Amazonian scrub flycatcher is a year-round resident.

=== Feeding ===
The Amazonian scrub flycatcher feeds on arthropods and small fruits. It forages low down in shrubs and small trees. It sits erect on a perch with its tail straight down and mostly hover-gleans or snatches fruit and insects from leaves in short sallies from it; it also takes some prey in mid-air. It is not known to follow mixed-species feeding flocks.

=== Breeding ===
The Amazonian scrub flycatcher's breeding season has not been detailed but appears to include July in Ecuador and March in Guyana. Its nest is a cup built in a branch fork, typically up to about 8 m (25 ft) above the ground. Nothing else is known about the species' breeding biology.

=== Vocalization ===
The Amazonian scrub flycatcher is not highly vocal, and there are limited number of recordings of it. Those in xeno-canto are mostly from Brazil and Ecuador with a few from Peru. Its dawn song is "two simple phrases, one is a slightly plaintive underslurred 'tseeeet' [and] the other is a double-noted 'chee-weeh!' ". During the day it makes a "descending call note 'pzzeeew', occasionally preceded by a single note 'pee-pzzeeew' ". Another description of the dawn song, from Ecuador, is "a repeated, rather sweet 'chwedeé...chwedeé...chwedeé...' that may continue for several minutes". A description from Peru is "a sweet rising whistle followed by a double whistle, descending at the end" TWOEE? whi-whiEEE...TWOEE? whi-whiEEE...".

== Status ==
The IUCN has assessed the Amazonian scrub flycatcher as being of Least Concern. It has an extremely large range; its population size is not known but is believed to be stable. No immediate threats have been identified. It is considered very local in Colombia, uncommon in Venezuela, rare and local in Ecuador, and local in Peru. Several field guides suggest it is easily overlooked. It occurs in at least one protected area in each of Ecuador, Peru, and Bolivia. It "[h]as probably increased, and will continue to do so, with degradation of primary forest; elevational range may increase with degradation at base of [eastern] Andes".
