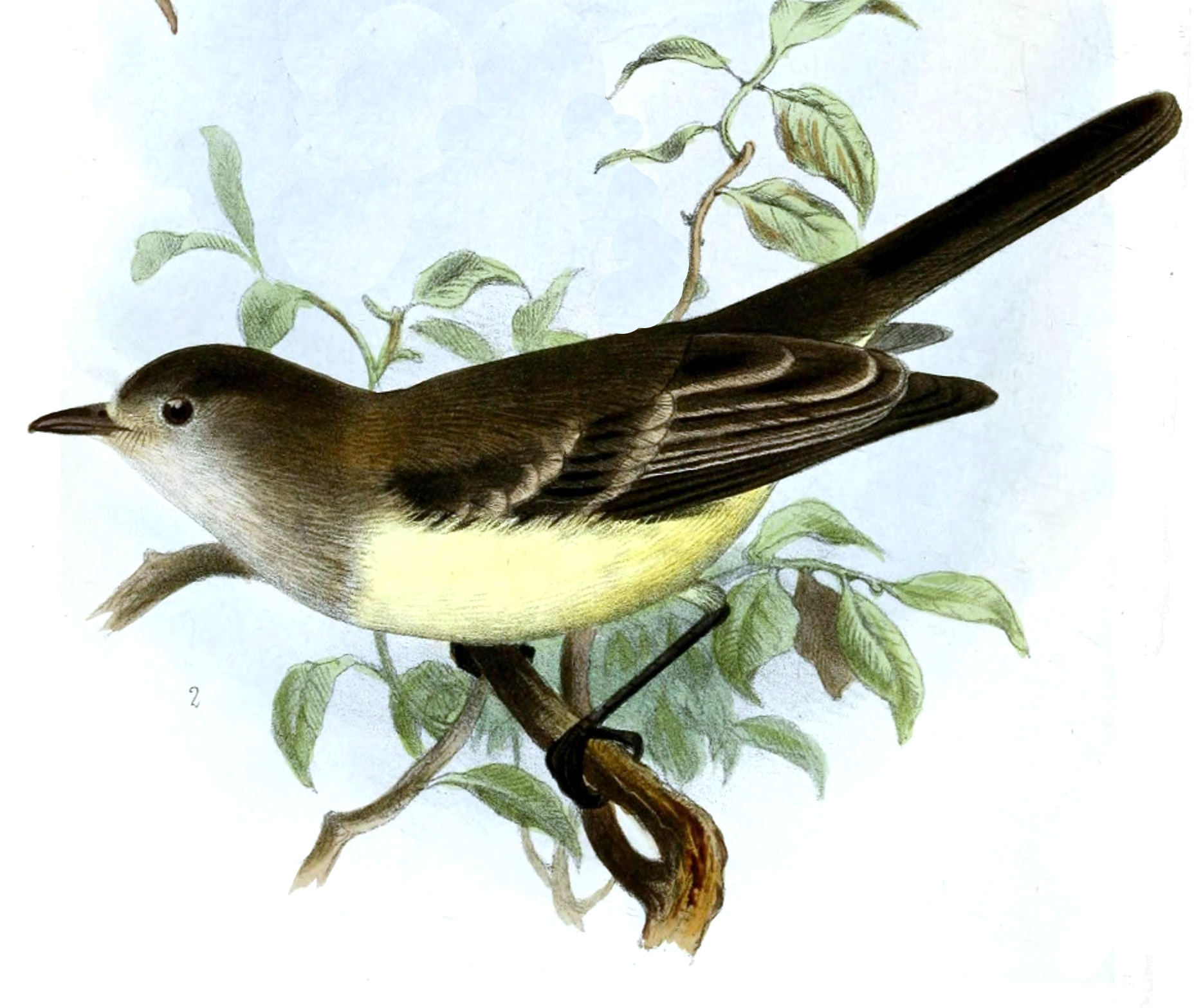
- Northern scrub flycatcher (Sublegatus arenarum)

Scientific classification
- Kingdom: Animalia
- Phylum: Chordata
- Class: Aves
- Order: Passeriformes
- Family: Tyrannidae
- Genus: Sublegatus; Sclater, PL & Salvin, 1868

Type species
- Sublegatus glaber P.L. Sclater & Salvin, 1868

= Sublegatus =

Genus of birds

Sublegatus is a genus of birds in the tyrant flycatcher family Tyrannidae.

The genus contains three species:

Image	Scientific name	Common name	Distribution
	Sublegatus arenarum	Northern scrub flycatcher	Aruba, Colombia, Costa Rica, French Guiana, Guyana, Netherlands Antilles, Panama, Suriname, Trinidad and Tobago, and Venezuela.
	Sublegatus modestus	Southern scrub flycatcher	Argentina, Bolivia, Brazil, Paraguay, Peru, and Uruguay
	Sublegatus obscurior	Amazonian scrub flycatcher or Todd's scrub flycatcher	Brazil, Colombia, Ecuador, French Guiana, Guyana, Peru, Suriname, Venezuela
