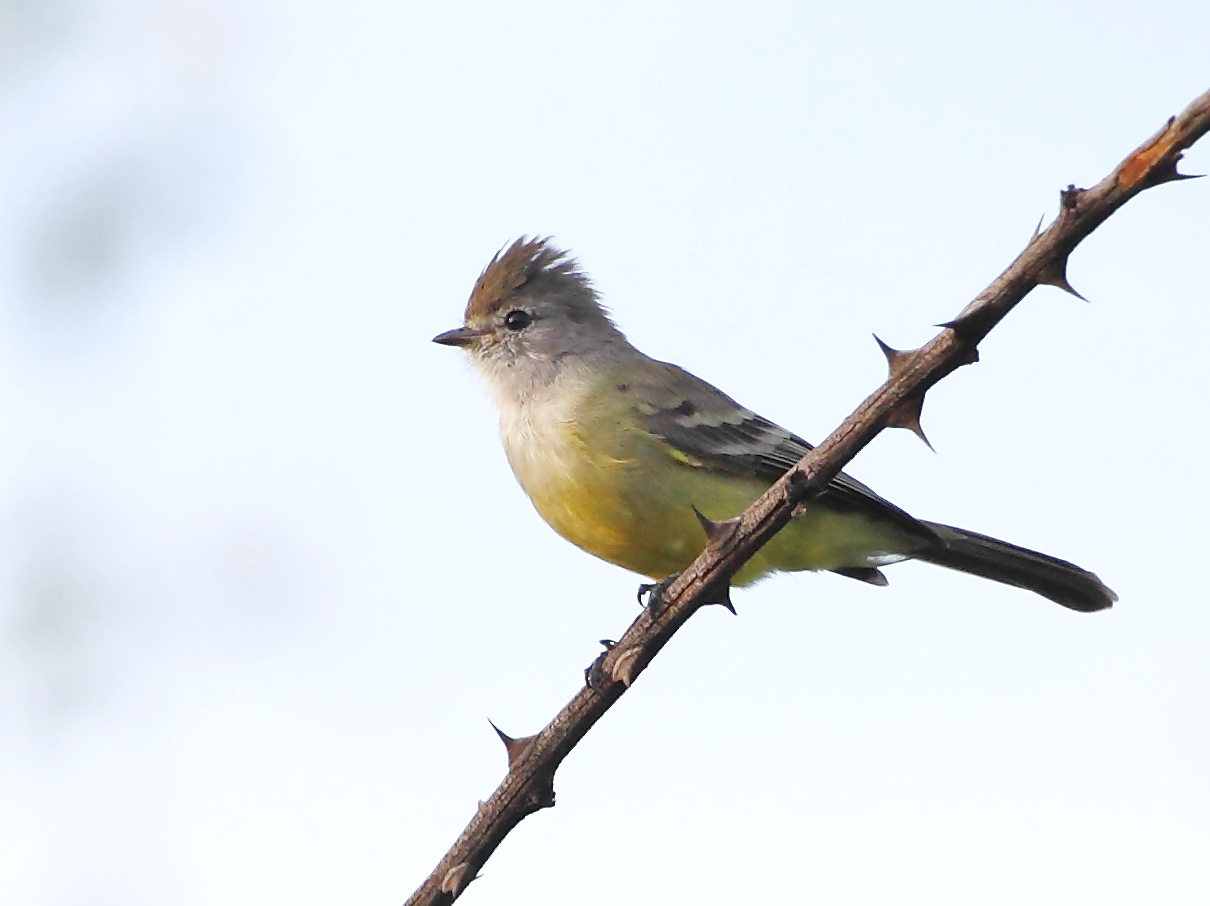
- Ceará state, Brazil

Conservation status
- Least Concern (IUCN 3.1)

Scientific classification
- Kingdom: Animalia
- Phylum: Chordata
- Class: Aves
- Order: Passeriformes
- Family: Tyrannidae
- Genus: Sublegatus
- Species: S. modestus

Binomial name
- Sublegatus modestus (Wied-Neuwied, M, 1831)

= Southern scrub flycatcher =

Species of bird

The southern scrub flycatcher (Sublegatus modestus) is a species of bird in the family Tyrannidae, the tyrant flycatchers. It is found in Argentina, Bolivia, Brazil, Paraguay, Peru, and Uruguay. Other sources also place it in Guyana, Suriname, as a non-breeding visitor to Colombia, and as a vagrant in Ecuador.

== Taxonomy and systematics ==
What are now the southern scrub flycatcher, northern scrub flycatcher (S. arenarum), and Amazonian scrub flycatcher (S. obscurior) were previously members of the single species named scrub flycatcher with the binomial S. modestus. The further taxonomy of the three scrub flycatchers has not been fully resolved.

As of late 2024, the southern scrub flycatcher has two subspecies, the nominate S. m. modestus (Wied, 1831) and S. m. brevirostris (d'Orbigny & Lafresnaye, 1839). At least one author has treated the Amazonian scrub flycatcher as a third subspecies.

== Description ==
The southern scrub flycatcher is 13 to 15 cm (5.1 to 5.9 in) long and weighs 9.5 to 13 g (0.34 to 0.46 oz). The sexes have the same plumage. Adults of the nominate subspecies have a grayish brown crown that sometimes erects as a shaggy crest. Their face is mostly whitish to pale gray with an almost invisible pale supercilium, a dark line through the eye, and a darker gray to the back of the ear coverts. Their back and rump are grayish brown. Their wings are dusky gray with paler grayish edges on the flight feathers and tips of the wing coverts; the latter show as two wing bars. Their tail is dusky. Their chin is whitish, their throat and breast are pale gray, and their belly medium to pale yellow with no sharp demarcation between the colors. Subspecies S. m. brevirostris has pure white tips on the wing coverts and longer wings and tail than the nominate. Both subspecies have a dark brown iris, a stubby black bill, and gray legs and feet.

== Distribution and habitat ==
Sources differ on the range of the southern scrub flycatcher. The International Ornithological Committee (IOC) places the nominate subspecies from central Peru and northern Bolivia east into eastern and southern Brazil. It places S. m. brevirostris from eastern Bolivia, Paraguay, and Uruguay south to central Argentina. The Clements taxonomy does not include Bolivia in the nominate's range and expands on its Brazilian range to note that it is bordered on the east roughly by Maranhão, Pernambuco, and Paraná states. Clements agrees with the IOC on the range of S. m. brevirostris. The Cornell Lab of Ornithology's Birds of the World agrees with the IOC on the nominate's range and adds that brevirostris occurs as a non-breeding visitor to northern and eastern Peru and "central Amazonia". The map in "A Field Guide to the Birds of Brazil" generally matches these source's range in Brazil. The South American Classification Committee of the American Ornithological Society does not provide separate ranges for subspecies. It places the southern scrub flycatcher in all of the countries named above and also in Guyana and Suriname, as a non-breeding visitor to Colombia, and as a vagrant in Ecuador. "Field Guide to the Birds of Colombia" notes a single record in that country. "A Field Checklist of the Birds of Guyana" includes the species. Avibase includes the species as rare and accidental in Guyana and Suriname.

The southern scrub flycatcher inhabits dry to arid scrublands and open deciduous woodlands. In elevation it mostly ranges from sea level in Brazil to 1,500 m (4,900 ft) in Peru. It has reached 2,750 m (9,000 ft) in Bolivia. The Colombian record was below 200 m (660 ft).

== Behavior ==
=== Movement ===
The southern scrub flycatcher is a partial migrant. Populations in Argentina and perhaps Bolivia, Uruguay, and Paraguay move as far north as Amazonian Peru and western Amazonian Brazil. The records in Ecuador, Colombia, Guyana, and Suriname hint that its wintering range extends further north than known, but the species is "typically overlooked because of highly inconspicuous behaviour and plumage".

=== Feeding ===
The southern scrub flycatcher feeds on arthropods. It forages low down in shrubs and small trees. It sits erect on a perch with its tail straight down and mostly hover-gleans or snatches insects from leaves in short sallies from it; it also takes some prey in mid-air.

=== Breeding ===
The southern scrub flycatcher's breeding season has not been detailed but includes September to December in Argentina and October in Paraguay. Its nest is a cup built in a branch fork, typically 1 to 2 m (3 to 7 ft) above the ground. In Argentina the clutch is two eggs. There the incubation period is 17 days and fledging occurs 14 to 16 days after hatch.

=== Vocalization ===
In the lowlands the southern scrub flycatcher's dawn song is "a loud, repeated 2-syllable 'pseee-ú' " and its call "a soft 'cheer' ". In Argentina it sings "some short notes followed by a descending, slightly hoarse whistle" di-di-di-DZEEE".

== Status ==
The IUCN has assessed the southern scrub flycatcher as being of Least Concern. It has an very large range; its population size is not known but is believed to be increasing. No immediate threats have been identified. It occurs in several protected areas. "Populations in second growth and open, dry woodland may presumably benefit from degradation of primary forest."
