= Quill/Boven National Park =

Important Bird Areas on Sint Eustatius in the Dutch Caribbean

Coordinates: 17°29′00″N 62°58′00″W

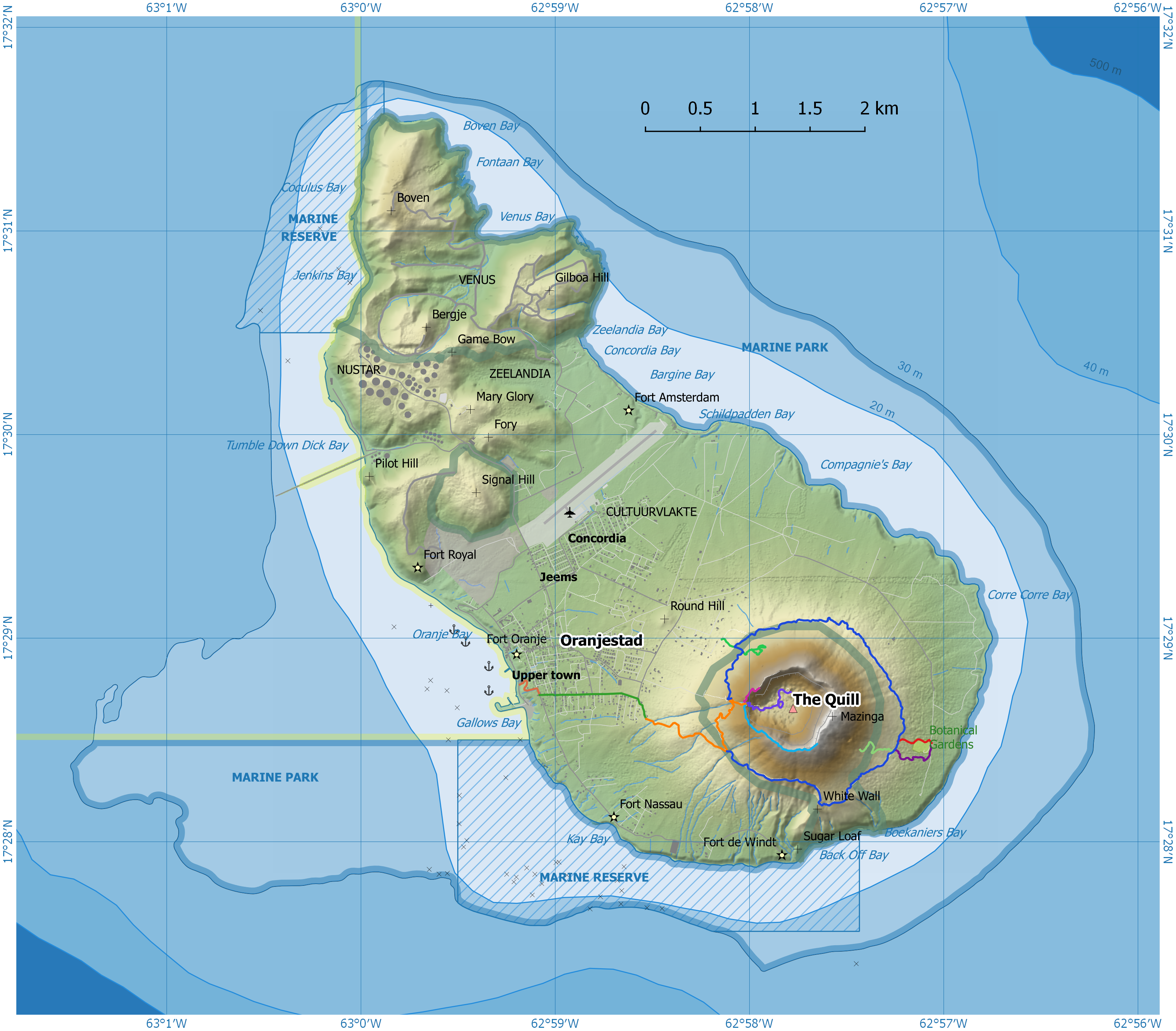
Map of Sint Eustatius showing Boven National Park in the north and Quill National Park in the south

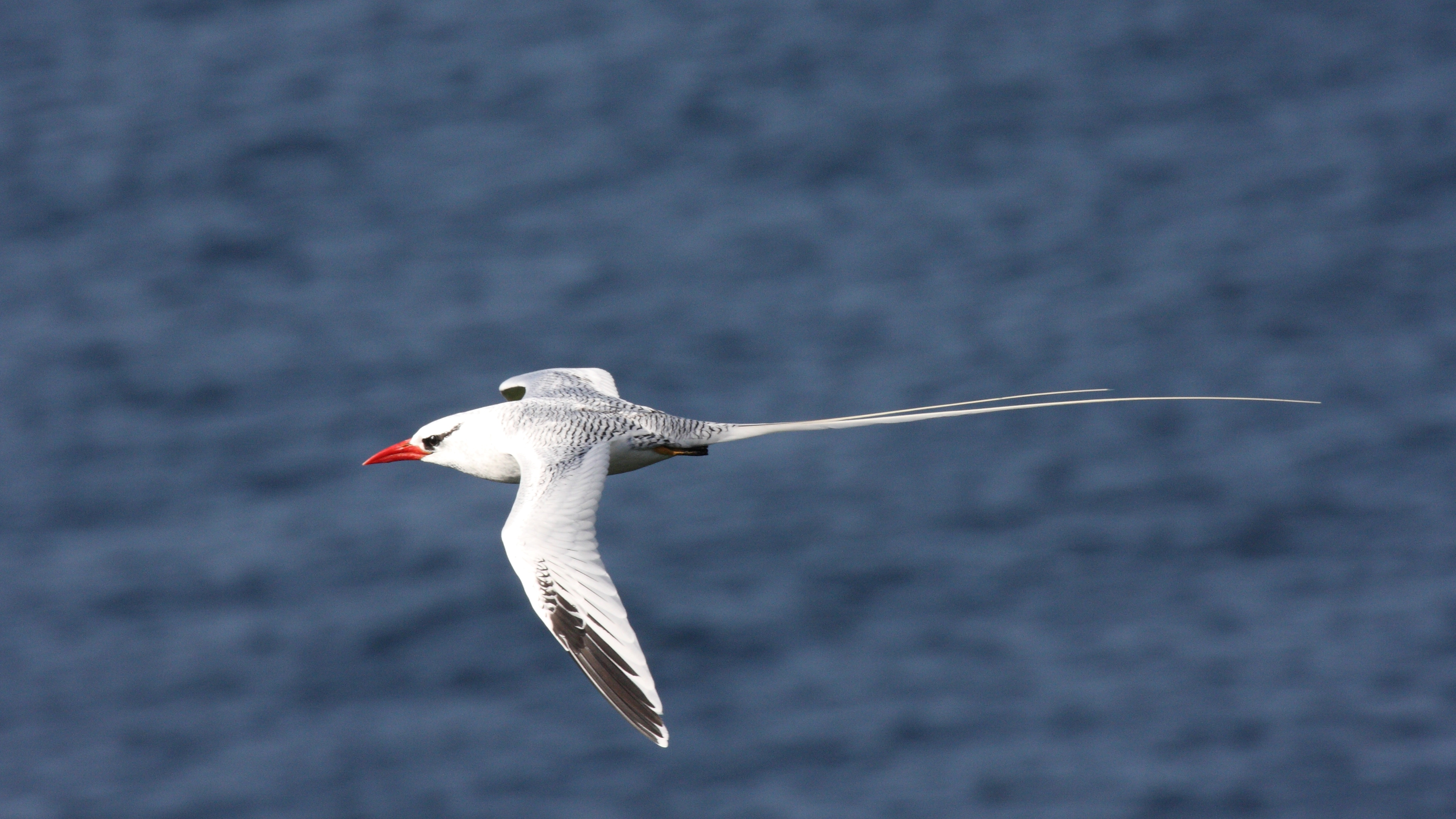
Red-billed tropicbirds breed on the Boven peninsula of Sint Eustatius

The Quill/Boven National Park comprises two separated sections of protected land at opposite ends of the island of Sint Eustatius in the Dutch Caribbean, maintained by the St. Eustatius National Parks Foundation (STENAPA). Both parts of the park have been identified by BirdLife International as Important Bird Areas (IBAs) because they support populations of several threatened or restricted-range bird species.

== History ==
The Quill/Boven National Park was established in 1997.

== Geography ==
The park is divided into two areas, one surrounding The Quill and the other surrounding the five hills of Boven, Bergje, Venus, Gilboa, and Signal. The total size of the park is five square kilometres.

== Ecology ==
The Boven IBA is a 1,016 ha peninsula of dry, rocky hills lying at the north-western end of the island. Its birds include a nesting colony of 100–200 red-billed tropicbirds, as well as resident green-throated caribs, Caribbean elaenias, pearly-eyed thrashers and lesser Antillean bullfinches. The Quill IBA is a 470 ha site at the south-eastern end of Sint Eustatius; it is dominated by a 600 m high stratovolcano vegetated with shrubland and, within the caldera, tropical semi-evergreen forest. Additional resident birds include bridled quail-doves, purple-throated caribs, Antillean crested hummingbirds and brown tremblers. Other animals present include lesser Antillean iguanas, red-bellied racers and several species of lizards and bats.
