= Dutch Caribbean Nature Alliance =

Caribbean regional partnership

Location of the Dutch Caribbean islands Aruba Curaçao Sint Maarten Caribbean Netherlands (from left to right): Bonaire; Saba; Sint Eustatius

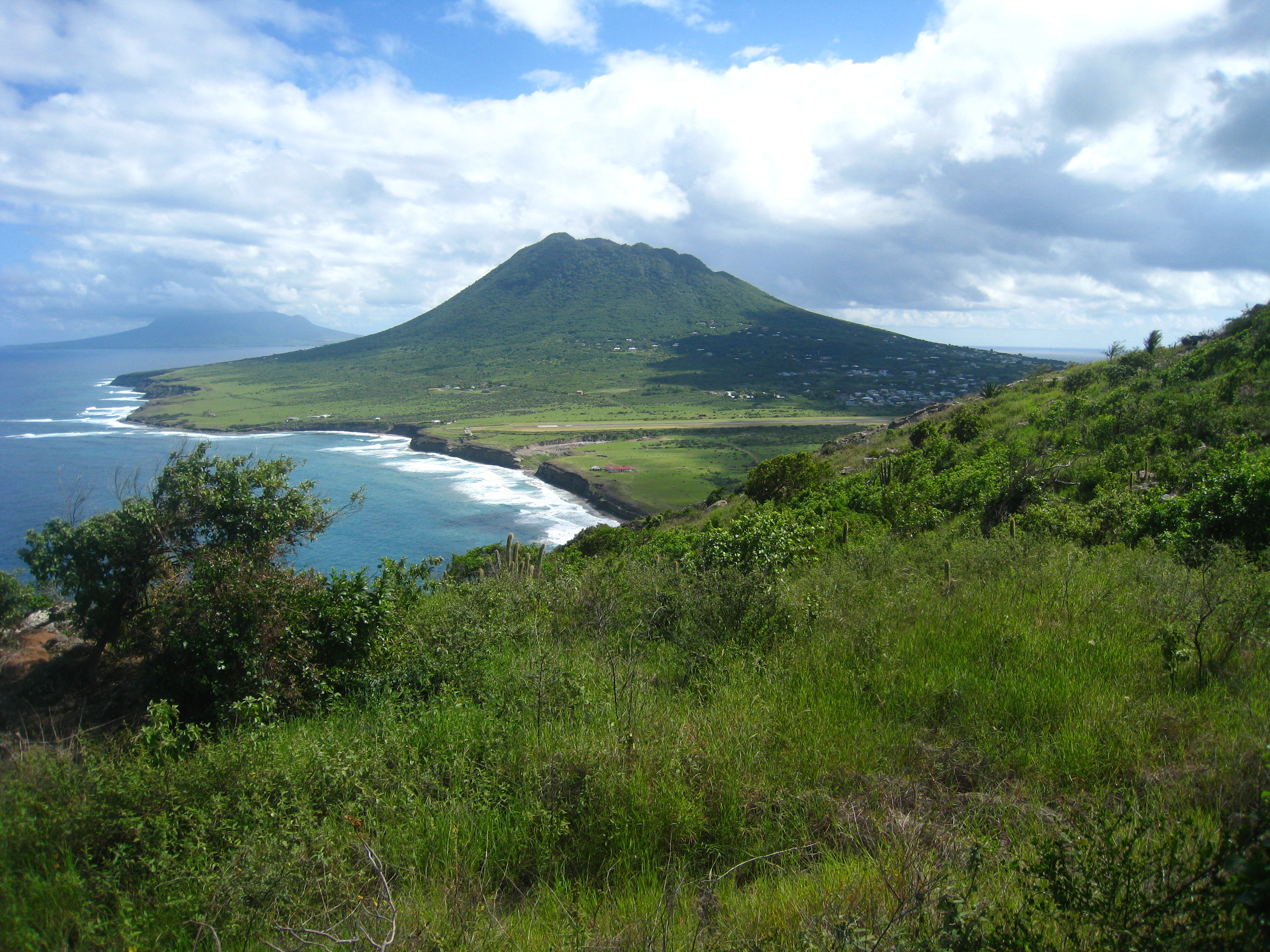
A view showing the National Park of St. Eustatius (The Quill/Boven National Park and St. Eustatius National Marine Park.

The Dutch Caribbean Nature Alliance (DCNA) is a regional partnership of conservation organisations, including the national parks on the six islands of the Dutch Caribbean (Aruba, Bonaire, Curaçao, Saba, St. Eustatius and St. Maarten) and is intended to support and strengthen the nature on the islands.

The purpose of DCNA is to protect the extensive biological resources and promote sustainable development of the natural resources of these islands, both on land and at sea. To do so, DCNA is developing sustainable funding sources such as a trust fund, building capacity through training workshops and promoting the overwhelmingly beautiful and unique nature, ranging from exuberant rainforest to coral reefs and pearl white sand dunes.

The extensive biological resources are the basis of one of the main sources of income on the islands: nature tourism. DCNA not only focuses on the sustainable management of existing protected areas, but also to increase awareness and knowledge of the value of nature.

The Dutch Caribbean Nature Alliance is a non-governmental, not-for-profit foundation that is designed to assist the national park organisations of the islands of the Dutch Caribbean, i.e. the islands of Aruba (Parke Nacional Arikok), Bonaire (STINAPA Bonaire), Curaçao, Saba (Saba Conservation Foundation), St. Eustatius (STENAPA) and St. Maarten (St. Maarten Nature Foundation). The central office of the DCNA is on Bonaire.

DCNA's mission statement is to "safeguard the biodiversity and promote the sustainable management of the natural resources of the islands of the Dutch Caribbean, both on land and in the water, for the benefit of present and future generations, by supporting and assisting the protected area management organisations and nature conservation activities in the Dutch Caribbean".

DCNA is funded by the Dutch National Postcode Lottery and the Dutch Ministry of Economic Affairs.

Princess Beatrix is one of DCNA's patrons.
