= STINAPA Bonaire =

Dutch non-governmental organization

The STINAPA Bonaire or National Parks Bonaire Foundation (Dutch: Stichting Nationale Parken Bonaire) is a non-governmental organization responsible for the management of the national parks on Bonaire in Caribbean Netherlands. STINAPA is a member of the Dutch Caribbean Nature Alliance.

The STINAPA Bonaire was created at the end of the 1980s as the successor to STINAPA N.A. (Stichting Nationale Parken Nederlandse Antillen), which had been established in 1962 to protect and manage nature in the Netherlands Antilles. The first activities took place on Bonaire where the Washington Slagbaai National Park was established in 1969. In that year, the Bonaire National Marine Park was added. After this, projects were also started on, among others, Curaçao and Saba, and in the late 1980s separate foundations were established on all Antillean islands.
