= The Quill (volcano) =

Stratovolcano on the island of Sint Eustatius

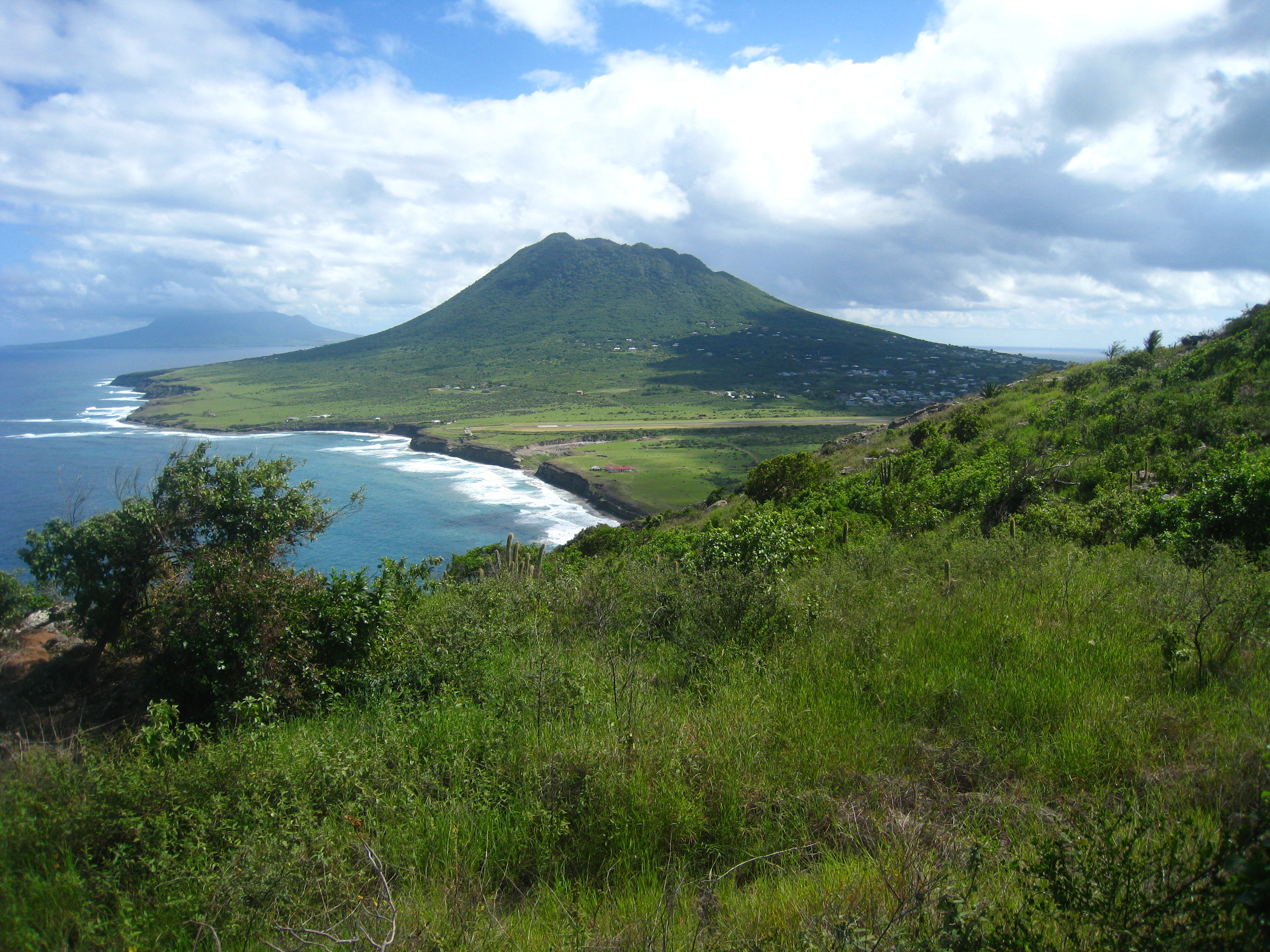
- Looking southeast across Statia toward the Quill

Highest point
- Elevation: 601 m (1,972 ft)
- Prominence: 601 m (1,972 ft)
- Listing: Volcanoes in the Netherlands
- Coordinates: 17°28′40″N 62°57′35″W

Geography
- Location within Netherlands Antilles Location within Lesser Antilles
- Location: Sint Eustatius, Caribbean Netherlands

Geology
- Mountain type: Stratovolcano
- Volcanic arc: Lesser Antilles Volcanic Arc
- Last eruption: 250 CE ± 150 years

The Quill (/kwɪl/ KWIL), also known as Mount Mazinga, is a stratovolcano located on the island of Sint Eustatius in the Caribbean Netherlands. The summit elevation of 601 m (1,972 ft) above sea level makes it the second highest mountain in the Netherlands.

The name Quill originates from the Dutch term kuil (pronounced [kœyl]), meaning 'pit' or 'hole', which was used originally with reference to the volcanic crater. The Quill was designated as a national park by the government of the Netherlands Antilles in 1998. Quill/Boven National Park is administered by the Sint Eustatius National Parks Foundation, STENAPA, which maintains a number of trails for hikers.

The Quill formed between 22,000 and 32,000 years ago to the southeast of Sint Eustatius (Statia) in the West Indies. Pyroclastic flows during the initial eruption joined The Quill with what is now the rest of Sint Eustatius. The last known eruption, as determined by radiocarbon dating, occurred about 1,600 years ago. The volcano had a VEI of 4 in the eruption.

== Flora and fauna ==
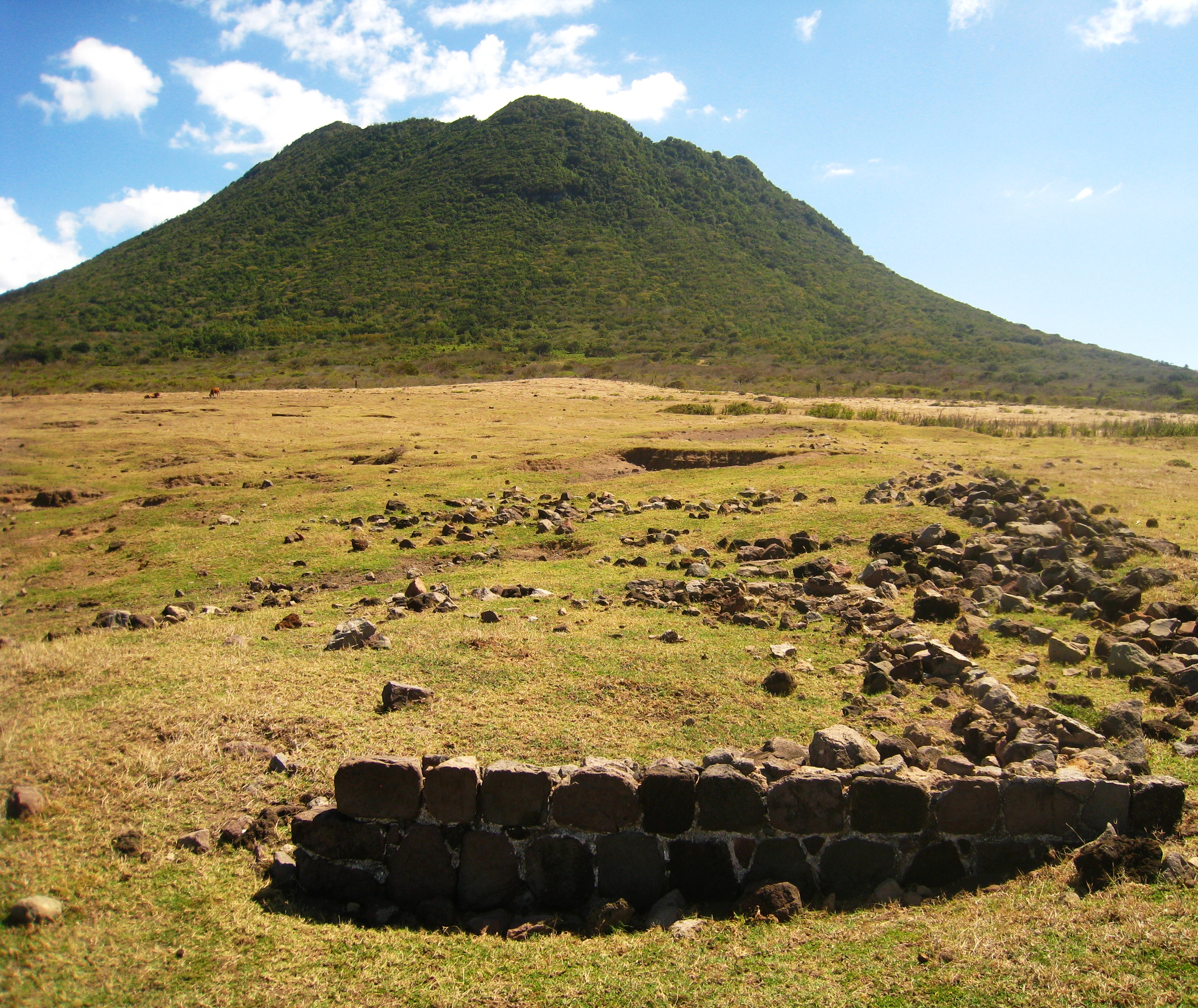
The Quill volcano, seen from St. Louis Battery ruins

The crater of The Quill contains a lush rainforest populated by native and introduced tropical trees and plants. These include elephant ears, tree ferns, begonias, figs, plantains, bananas, bromeliads, trumpet wood, mahogany, seedless breadfruit, Surinam cherry, ginger bush and edible raspberries, as well as at least 17 different kinds of orchids. Resident animal species include iguanas, anoles, snakes, Caribbean hermit crabs, butterflies, exotic birds, and occasional goats and chickens that have strayed from nearby Oranjestad.
