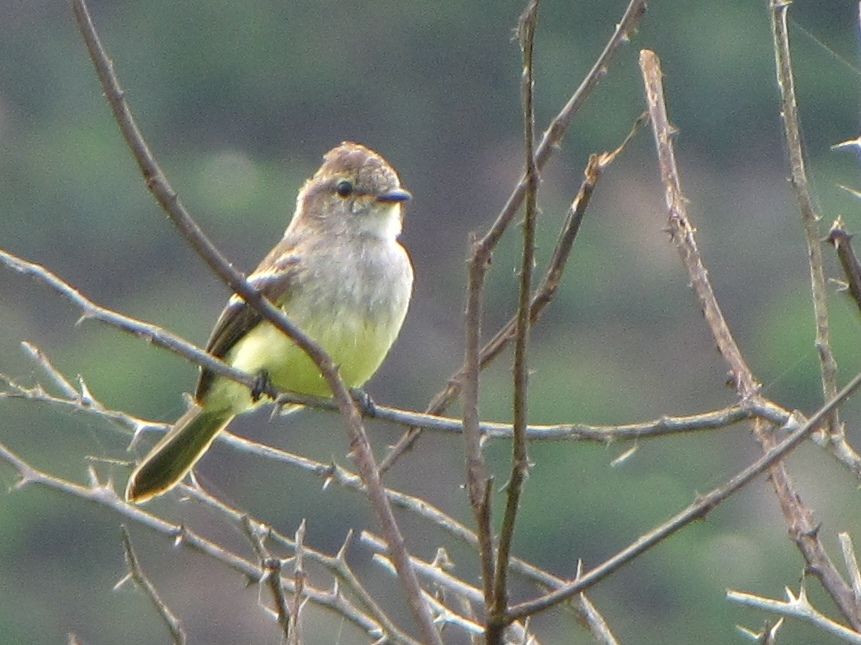

Conservation status
- Least Concern (IUCN 3.1)

Scientific classification
- Kingdom: Animalia
- Phylum: Chordata
- Class: Aves
- Order: Passeriformes
- Family: Tyrannidae
- Genus: Sublegatus
- Species: S. arenarum

Binomial name
- Sublegatus arenarum (Salvin, 1863)

= Northern scrub flycatcher =

Species of bird

The northern scrub flycatcher (Sublegatus arenarum) is a species of bird in the family Tyrannidae, the tyrant flycatchers. It is found in Aruba, Bonaire, Colombia, Costa Rica, Curaçao, French Guiana, Guyana, Panama, Suriname, Trinidad, and Venezuela.

== Taxonomy and systematics ==
What are now the northern scrub flycatcher, Amazonian scrub flycatcher (S. obscurior), and southern scrub flycatcher (S. modestus) were previously members of the single species named scrub flycatcher with the binomial S. modestus. The further taxonomy of the three scrub flycatchers has not been fully resolved.

As of late 2024, the northern scrub flycatcher was assigned these six subspecies:

- S. a. arenarum (Salvin, 1863)
- S. a. atrirostris (Lawrence, 1871)
- S. a. glaber Sclater, PL & Salvin, 1868
- S. a. tortugensis Phelps, WH & Phelps, WH Jr, 1946
- S. a. pallens Zimmer, JT, 1941
- S. a. orinocensis Zimmer, JT, 1941

Some authors have suggested that S. a. arenarum, possibly with S. a. atrirostris, should be treated as a species separate from the "smooth scrub flycatcher" (S. glaber) that includes the other subspecies. Subspecies S. a. tortugensis and S. a. pallens are almost indistinguishable from each other and may represent a single subspecies. S. a. pallens and S. a. orinocensis have been treated as subspecies of the southern scrub flycatcher. The scrub flycatchers were long thought to be closely related to elaenias but genetic data show them to be only distantly related.

== Description ==
The northern scrub flycatcher is 13 to 15 cm (5.1 to 5.9 in) long and weighs 10.5 to 15 g (0.37 to 0.53 oz). The sexes have the same plumage. Adults of the nominate subspecies S. a. arenarum have a grayish brown crown that sometimes erects as a shaggy crest. Their face is mostly whitish to pale gray with a whitish supercilium, a dark line through the eye, and a darker gray to the back of the ear coverts. Their back and rump are grayish brown. Their wings are dusky gray with paler grayish to whitish edges on the flight feathers and tips of the wing coverts; the latter show as two wing bars. Their tail is dusky with white tips on the feathers. Their chin is whitish, their throat and breast pale gray, and their belly medium yellow; their breast and belly are sharply demarcated. All subspecies have a dark brown iris, a stubby black bill, and gray legs and feet. Juveniles resemble adults.

The other subspecies of the northern scrub flycatcher differ from the nominate and each other thus:

- S. a. glaber: larger than nominate with darker, olive-brown, upperparts and duller whitish to buff wing bars
- S. a. atrirostris: paler gray-brown upperparts, a duller white throat, and paler gray breast and flanks than nominate
- S. a. pallens: slightly smaller and paler gray above than atrirostris with a whiter throat and breast
- S. a. tortugensis: throat even whiter than palens'; otherwise the same
- S. a. orinocensis: smallest and palest subspecies

== Distribution and habitat ==
The northern scrub flycatcher has a disjunct distribution. The subspecies are found thus:

- S. a. arenarum: around the Gulf of Nicoya in northwestern Costa Rica and Golfo Dulce in southwestern Costa Rica; intermittently along Pacific slope of Panama to western Darién Province; Coiba Island and the Pearl Islands off western Panama
- S. a. atrirostris: northern Colombia from Sucre and Bolívar departments to La Guajira Department
- S. a. glaber: northern Venezuela from Zulia east to Sucre; Venezuela's Margarita and Patos Islands and Los Roques Archipelago; Trinidad and adjoining islets; coastal Guyana, French Guiana, and Suriname
- S. a. tortugensis: Venezuela's La Tortuga Island
- S. a. pallens: Aruba, Bonaire, and Curaçao
- S. a. orinocensis: valley of the Orinoco River from eastern Meta Department in Colombia east into western Venezuela and intermittently beyond to northern Bolívar state

The northern scrub flycatcher inhabits a variety of landscapes. Most subspecies are found in mangroves and nearby scrubby vegetation. Subspecies S. a. glaber occurs there, in cactus and deciduous thorn woodlands, and desert. Subspecies S. a. atrirostris and S. a. orinocensis are found mostly in dry woodlands and scrubby second growth. In elevation the species occurs from sea level to about 600 m (2,000 ft).

== Behavior ==
=== Movement ===
The northern scrub flycatcher is a year-round resident.

=== Feeding ===
The northern scrub flycatcher feeds on arthropods and small fruits. It forages low down in shrubs and small trees. It sits erect on a perch and mostly hover-gleans or snatches fruit and insects from leaves in short sallies from it.

=== Breeding ===
The northern scrub flycatcher breeds primarily between March and June. Its nest is a cup, usually placed in a tree fork between about 2 and 6 m (7 and 20 ft) above the ground. The clutch is two eggs that are incubated for about 14 days. The time to fledging and details of parental care are not known.

=== Vocalization ===
The northern scrub flycatcher is not highly vocal. Its most common calls are "an abrupt pweEEe! and peEEap! given singly or doubled". Other calls include a repeated "brisk, whistled phew! - dit" and single "pfweE or weEEe" notes.

== Status ==
The IUCN has assessed the northern scrub flycatcher as being of Least Concern. It has a very large range; its estimated population of at least 500,000 mature individuals is believed to be stable. "The impact of deforestation on the population are unclear, as the degradation of primary forests may benefit populations inhabiting secondary growth and dry woodland, while it may threaten populations in mangroves." It is It is considered "fairly uncommon" in northern Costa Rica and rare in the country's south. It is considered fairly common in Colombia and Venezuela. It occurs in a few protected areas.
