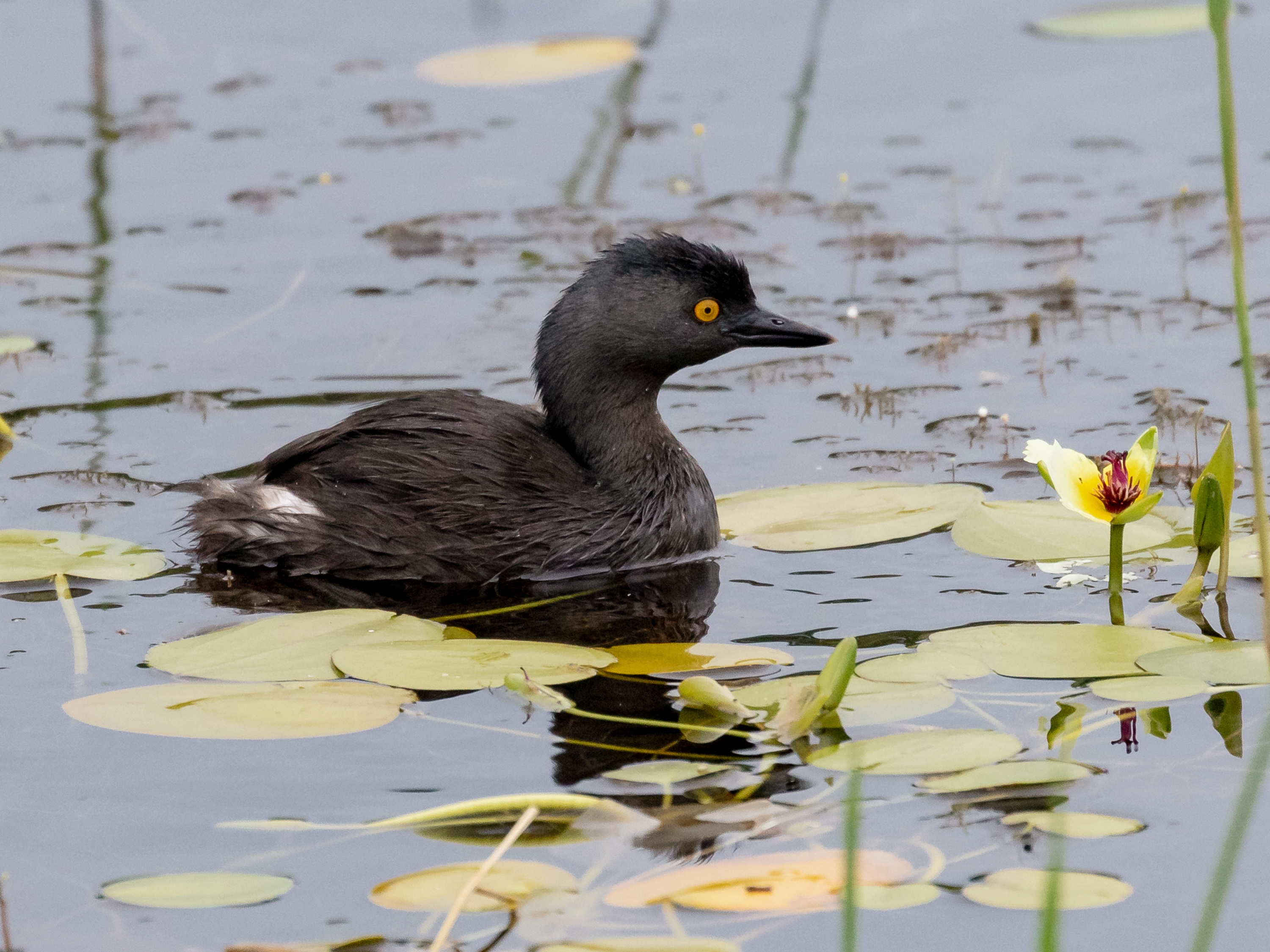
- In Corumbá, Brazil

Conservation status
- Least Concern (IUCN 3.1)

Scientific classification
- Kingdom: Animalia
- Phylum: Chordata
- Class: Aves
- Order: Podicipediformes
- Family: Podicipedidae
- Genus: Tachybaptus
- Species: T. dominicus

Binomial name
- Tachybaptus dominicus (Linnaeus, 1766)
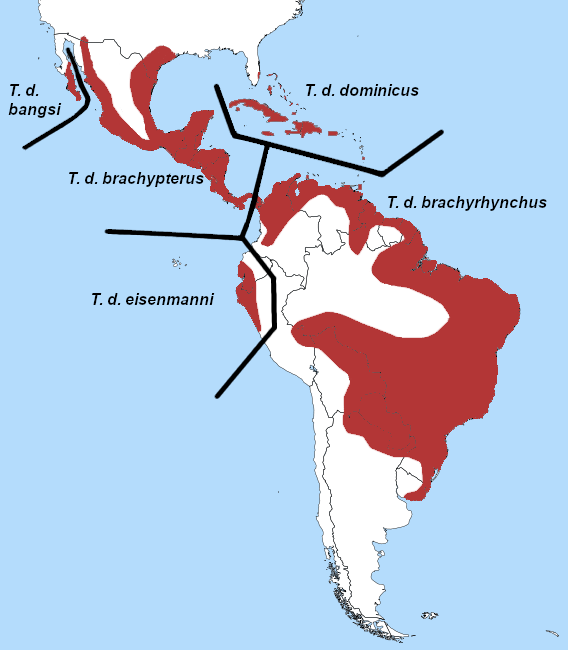
- Range of T. dominicus Subspecies separated by black lines

Synonyms
- Colymbus dominicus Linnaeus, 1766; Podiceps dominicus

= Least grebe =

Species of bird

The least grebe (Tachybaptus dominicus), an aquatic bird, is the smallest member of the grebe family. It occurs in the New World from the southwestern United States and Mexico to Argentina, and also on Trinidad and Tobago, the Bahamas and the Greater Antilles.

== Description ==
The least grebe ranges in length from 21–27 cm (8.3–10.6 in) (depending on the subspecies) and in weight from 112–180 g (4.0–6.3 oz). Weights are variable based on region and subspecies, being smaller in Panama, where males weighed a mean of 129 g (4.6 oz) against the females 116 g (4.1 oz) and larger in the West Indies, where the sexes weigh a mean of 161 g (5.7 oz) and 133 g (4.7 oz), respectively. In Texas, size is intermediate at 139 g (4.9 oz) and 122 g (4.3 oz). Even in the largest races, the least grebe is still smaller and lighter than any other grebe species. Like all grebes, its legs are set far back on its body and it cannot walk well, though it is an excellent swimmer and diver. Small and plump, with a fairly short, sharp-pointed beak and bright yellow eyes, it typically appears quite dark all over.

The breeding adult is brownish grey above with a darker blackish crown and throat. It has a brownish chest and pale underparts. It shows a white wing patch in flight. Non-breeding birds are paler with a whitish throat, and immatures are paler and greyer than adults. Unlike all other members of its genus, it lacks any chestnut coloring on its neck.

== Taxonomy ==
There are five recognized subspecies of least grebe, separated principally by size and color.

- T. d. brachypterus – (Chapman, 1899): is found from southern Texas and Mexico south to Panama.
- T. d. bangsi – (van Rossem & Hachisuka, 1937): is restricted to southern Baja California, Mexico. It is the smallest and palest of the subspecies.
- T. d. dominicus – (Linnaeus, 1766): nominate, is found in the northern Caribbean, including the Bahamas, Greater Antilles, Virgin Islands and southern Florida.
- T. d. brachyrhynchus or T. d. speciosus – (Chapman, 1899): is found in South America, from Colombia, Venezuela, Trinidad and Tobago south to northern Argentina and southern Brazil.
- T. d. eisenmanni – Storer & Getty, 1985: is restricted to the lowlands of western Ecuador. This subspecies is not recognized by all authorities.

Its genus name, Tachybaptus, is a combination of two Greek words—takhus meaning fast and baptos meaning diving, or sinking under. The specific name dominicus refers to the Caribbean island of Hispaniola, which was formerly known as Santo Domingo, and also where the species was first described. As its English name suggests, the least grebe is overall the smallest member of the grebe family. It is the only member of its genus found in the New World; the four other members of the genus Tachybaptus reside in the Old World and Australasia.

== Habitat and range ==
Least grebes are found in a wide variety of wetland habitats, including freshwater ponds, lakes, and marshes, slow-flowing streams and rivers, roadside ditches, and mangrove swamps. In general, they prefer bodies of water with significant amounts of vegetative cover, particularly along the edges; they will even use wetlands which are almost completely overgrown. They may choose small, temporary bodies of water to breed, in an effort to avoid predation of their chicks by large fish.

== Behavior ==
For much of the year, least grebes are found singly or in pairs; however, when not breeding, they sometimes gather in flocks of 20 or more.

=== Diet ===
The least grebe eats a variety of aquatic life, including small fish, crustaceans, frogs and aquatic insects. Like all grebes, it pursues much of its prey under water. During active feeding bouts, it spends an average of 12.5 seconds beneath the surface on each dive, with surface pauses ranging from 2–24 seconds.

=== Breeding ===
Least grebes breed throughout the year. Those in the tropics tend to breed during the rainy season, while active nests have been found in every month of the year in Texas. Each pair builds a compact floating nest of vegetation—typically a variety of aquatic weeds—which is anchored to rooted plants in still open water as deep as 1.5 m (4.9 ft). The female lays three to six white eggs, though the damp nest material soon stains them with brown. Both adults incubate the eggs, which hatch after 21 days. The striped young are sometimes carried on the adult's back.

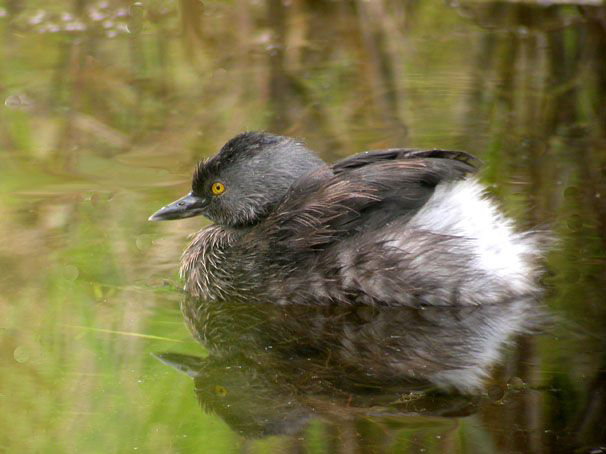
Breeding plumage

=== Voice ===
The breeding call has been likened to a horse whinnying.

== Threats ==
The least grebe, while a species of least concern, experiences a number of predators, particularly early in life. Large fish species and turtles are reported to take young grebes, and bird-eating raptors, including the bat falcon and the golden eagle, have been observed taking adult birds.
