= Yellow-shouldered amazon =

- Amazona barbadensis in Paraguaná Zoological Park in Venezuela

Conservation status
- Near Threatened (IUCN 3.1)
- CITES Appendix I

Scientific classification
- Kingdom: Animalia
- Phylum: Chordata
- Class: Aves
- Order: Psittaciformes
- Family: Psittacidae
- Genus: Amazona
- Species: A. barbadensis

Binomial name
- Amazona barbadensis (Gmelin, JF, 1788)

Species of bird

The yellow-shouldered amazon (Amazona barbadensis), also known as the yellow-shouldered parrot, is a parrot of the genus Amazona that is found in the arid areas of northern Venezuela, the Venezuelan islands of Margarita and La Blanquilla, and the island of Bonaire (Caribbean Netherlands). It has been extirpated from and reintroduced to Aruba and introduced to Curaçao.

== Taxonomy ==
The yellow-shouldered amazon was described and illustrated in 1738 by the English naturalist Eleazar Albin in his A Natural History of Birds based on live specimen. Albin believed that the parrot had come from Barbados and used the English name, the "Barbadoes parrot". Using Albin's account, both Mathurin Jacques Brisson in 1760 and John Latham in 1781 included a description of the parrot in their books on birds. When in 1788 the German naturalist Johann Friedrich Gmelin revised and expanded Carl Linnaeus's Systema Naturae, he included the yellow-shouldered amazon, coined the binomial name Psittacus barbadensis and cited Latham's work. Gmelin specified the type locality as Barbados but this parrot species is not found on the island and Venezuela is the type locality. The yellow-shouldered amazon is now placed with around thirty other species in the genus Amazona that was introduced by the French naturalist René Lesson in 1830. The genus name is a Latinized version of the name Amazone given to these parrot in the 18th century by the Comte de Buffon, who believed they were native to Amazonian jungles. The specific barbadensis denotes Barbados. The species is monotypic: no subspecies are recognised.

== Description ==
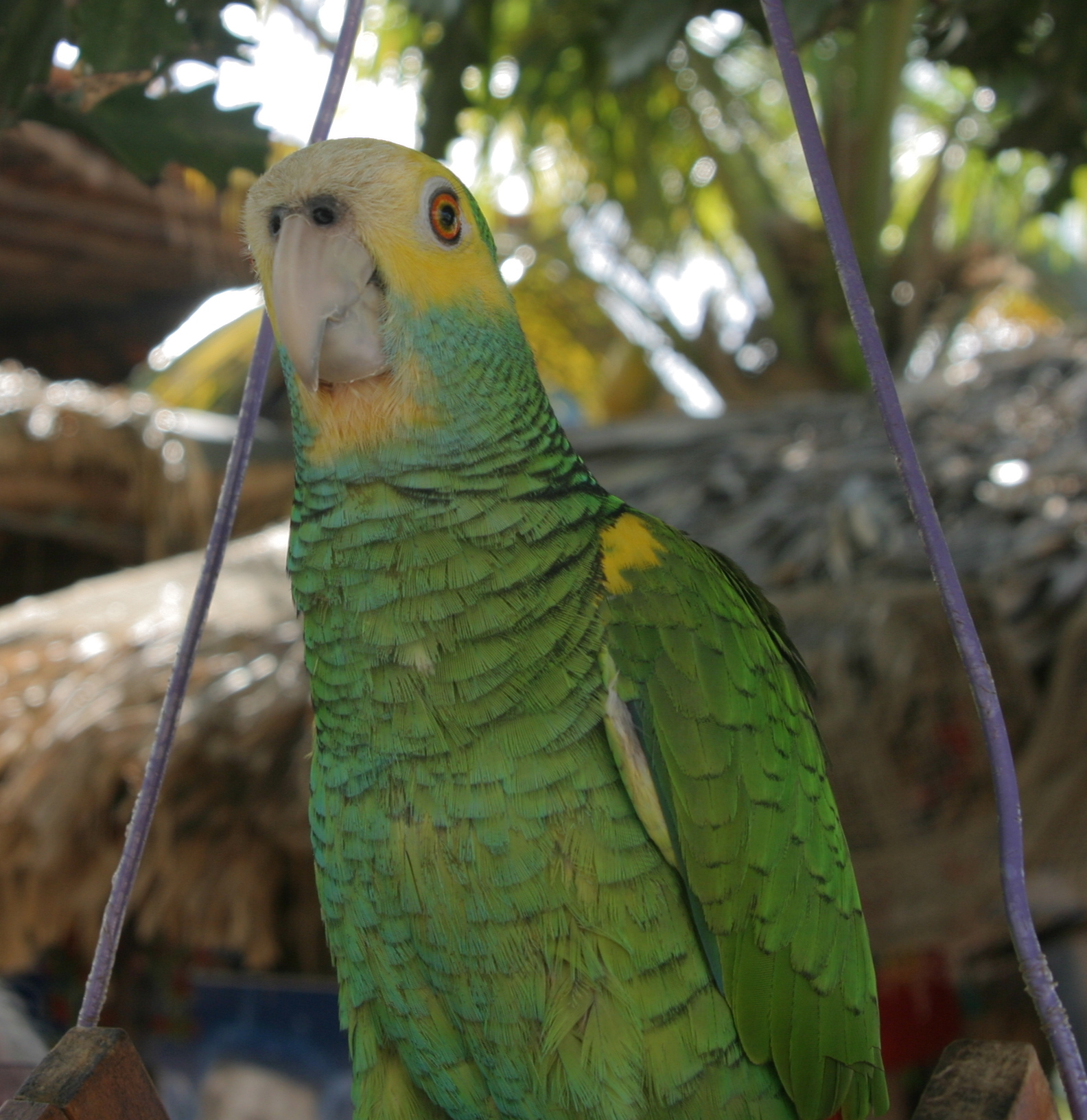
Front view

The yellow-shouldered amazon is mainly green and about 33 cm long (~13 inches). It has a whitish forehead and lores, and a yellow crown, ocular region and - often - ear coverts and chin. The bare eye-ring is white. The thighs and the bend of the wing ("shoulder") are yellow, but both can be difficult to see. The throat, cheeks and belly often have a bluish tinge. As most members of the genus Amazona, it has broad dark blue tips to the remiges and a red wing-speculum.

The yellow-shouldered amazon can be distinguished from the very similar orange-winged amazon by the latter's lack of yellow on its shoulders and blue colouration around the eyes. Another way of distinguishing it from other Amazona species is its somewhat higher pitched vocalizations.

== Distribution and habitat ==
A. barbadensis is endemic to northern Venezuela, Bonaire (which may have less than 400 birds), and other islands in the area. On the Venezuelan island of Margarita, it is extirpated from the east side, which is heavily commercialized and a popular tourist destination, existing only on the Macanao Peninsula. Also native to Aruba, it went locally extinct by 1947. In January 2024, a population of over two dozen of these birds was reintroduced to the island and is doing well. An introduced population exists on Curaçao. Unlike other Amazona members, it is typically found in arid habitats, such as desert scrub and dry forests.

== Behavior ==
=== Food and feeding ===
It feeds on fruits, seeds, and flowers, frequently consuming parts of cactus plants. The parrot is able to survive with minimal water, getting a large amount of moisture from their diet. This is especially clear on La Blanquilla, a small island with no natural bodies of water. The cacti that they so often eat are filled with liquid, in both the stems and fruits, and this keeps them alive in their arid environment.

=== Breeding ===
The yellow-shouldered amazon typically nests in holes in trees, cliffs, or cacti, and lays 2-5 eggs. Total clutch size and hatching success of this species on Margarita Island are among the highest documented for the genus Amazona, suggesting a high reproductive potential for the species It is highly gregarious, and can sometimes roost in communally in tall trees, forming groups of as many as 700. The population on Bonaire appears to breed slower than is typical for the species, bringing it in line with other members of the genus.

== Status ==
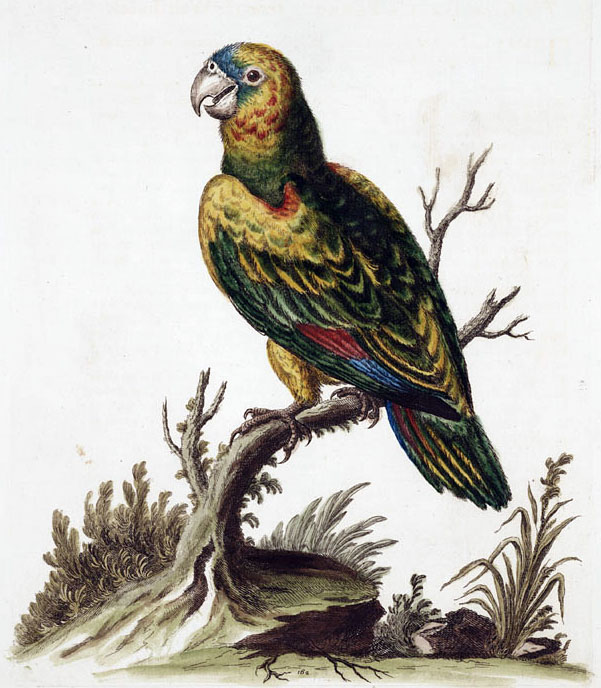
Possible extinct subspecies from Aruba, A. b. canifrons

Declines in several main land populations have been extensively documented, there are believed to be 2,500–10,000 yellow-shouldered amazons in the wild.

Due to ongoing habitat lost, small population size, limited range and overhunting for the pet trade, the yellow-shouldered amazon is evaluated as Vulnerable on the IUCN Red List of Threatened Species. On La Blanquilla, the main issues are predation by feral cats and hunting by local fishermen and Naval personnel. It is listed on Appendix I of CITES. Thanks to local surveillance by the Venezuelan NGO Provita, poaching has been significantly lowered in certain areas.

The population on the Caribbean island of Margarita had been as low as 750 birds in 1989, but thanks to conservation efforts, there were an estimated 2,400 by 2002, although different estimates describe just 2,000 in 2015. These efforts involved, among other things, the breeding and releasing of captive individuals, which was done with much success in the 1990s.
