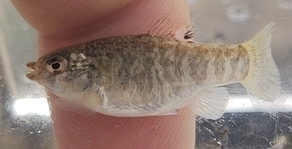

Conservation status
- Least Concern (IUCN 3.1)

Scientific classification
- Kingdom: Animalia
- Phylum: Chordata
- Class: Actinopterygii
- Order: Cyprinodontiformes
- Family: Cyprinodontidae
- Genus: Cyprinodon
- Species: C. dearborni

Binomial name
- Cyprinodon dearborni Meek, 1909

= Cyprinodon dearborni =

Willemstad pupfish

Species of fish

Cyprinodon dearborni, the Willemstad pupfish or petotica pupfish, is a species of pupfish native to the ABC islands of the Lesser Antilles. Pupfish populations found along the northern coast of South America are also identified as C. dearborni though genetic evidence suggests that they represent another, so far undescribed species. The species is euryhaline, though it rarely inhabits freshwater and brackish habitats for long; it prefers hypersaline lagoons and bays. Its habitats frequently contain plenty of blue-green algae, which is a staple in its diet; the fish may also take pieces of vegetation and small invertebrates. The species is rarely parasitized, but frequently preyed upon by other fish and birds. The pupfish lay eggs in nests guarded by males. They grow to about 4.8 cm (1.9 in).

== Taxonomy and evolution ==
- - - - - C. variegatus
        - C. dearborni (Antilles)
      - - - C. atrorus
      - - C. dearborni (South America)
      - - C. artifrons
    - - C. bifasciatus

Phylogenetic relationships of C. dearborni lineages, based on the concatenated sequences of mitochondrial and nuclear DNA

Cyprinodon dearborni is the only Cyprinodon species native to South America; the only other pupfish native to the continent are the endemic Orestias. Genetic testing has revealed that C. dearborni is polyphyletic, consisting of two long-isolated lineages. One is closely allied with C. variegatus. The other, uncovered only through DNA sequencing, is as closely related to the first lineage as it is to C. variegatus, C. atrorus and C. artifrons. The second lineage, representing the population from South America, likely represents an undescribed species. The two C. dearborni lineages appear to stem from separate colonizations of coastal South America. The lineage related to C. variegatus arrived via sea during Pleistocene diversification, while the other arrived in an older event dating to roughly three to six million years ago.

The specific epithet honors the US biologist Ned Dearborn.

== Description ==
Cyprinodon dearborni has a sturdy, deep-bodied profile, with the back rising noticeably behind a large, broad head. The space between the eyes is flat, and the snout is relatively short. The lower jaw projects slightly beyond the upper and is more robust. The teeth are three-pointed. The dorsal fin begins just behind the pelvic fins, while the pectoral, pelvic, and tail-base proportions fall within the ranges typical for the genus; males have a somewhat deeper caudal peduncle than females. An enlarged humeral blotch is present.

Coloration ranges from dark olive to nearly black. Males are uniformly dark, with black edging on all fins except the dorsal. Females show a mottled pattern that may form faint bars, along with a thin dark bar at the base of the tail. Both the dorsal and anal fins carry a black eyespot on their posterior rays. None of the fins have the black tips seen in some related forms. Overall, the species is similar to C. riverendi but smaller and more slender, and its darker pigmentation and proportionally larger head help distinguish it from that species.

== Distribution and habitat ==
Cyprinodon dearborni is found on the ABC islands of the Lesser Antilles. Populations have been recorded in the bay of Willemstad on Curaçao (which is the type locality) as well as across a variety of coastal habitats on Aruba, Curaçao, Bonaire, and Klein Bonaire, including lagoons, salt pans, and sheltered bays.

The range of fish identified as Cyprinodon dearborni in South America extends along the coast from the Guajira Peninsula in eastern Colombia eastward to Venezuela's Margarita Island. In western Venezuela, occurrences have been reported from the salinas of Tucacas near the Morrocoy National Park and various lagoons and salinas adjacent to Puerto Cabello and Guajira Península. In the Gulf of Venezuela, the species has been recorded in the hypersaline lagoons of the Gulf of Coro, the Paraguaná Peninsula, and in the lagoons of the Cuare Wildlife Refuge. On the eastern coasts and islands of Venezuela, this species has been recorded in multiple hypersaline coastal lagoons on the islands of Margarita and Coche and in the lagoons of the Los Roques Archipelago.

Cyprinodon dearborni has been recorded in Guyana and Trinidad; the validity of these records has been challenged on the grounds that the region's heavy rainfall prevents the formation of the species' preferred hypersaline habitats, and it has not been recorded in numerous other surveys.

Cyprinodon dearborni frequently forms shoals of dozens to hundreds of individuals in very shallow waters under 60 cm deep, particularly over bottoms covered with blue-green algae. They can survive in salinities ranging from freshwater up to 130‰ (130 parts per thousand), but are rarely found in low‑salinity environments. The species appears to only inhabit brackish or freshwater zones when these are connected to higher‑salinity areas. It is most commonly seen in seawater lagoons and salt pans with salinities up to 90‰. While individuals may occasionally venture into brines of 130‰, they do not remain long, and salinities exceeding 150‰ appear fatal. In the Netherlands Antilles, water temperatures remain fairly consistent, ranging only from 26 to 35 °C. Occasionally, layers with higher salinity can heat the bottom water to 50–60 °C; in these situations, the fish are capable of relocating to cooler layers or to sections where the water is not thermally stratified.

== Ecology ==
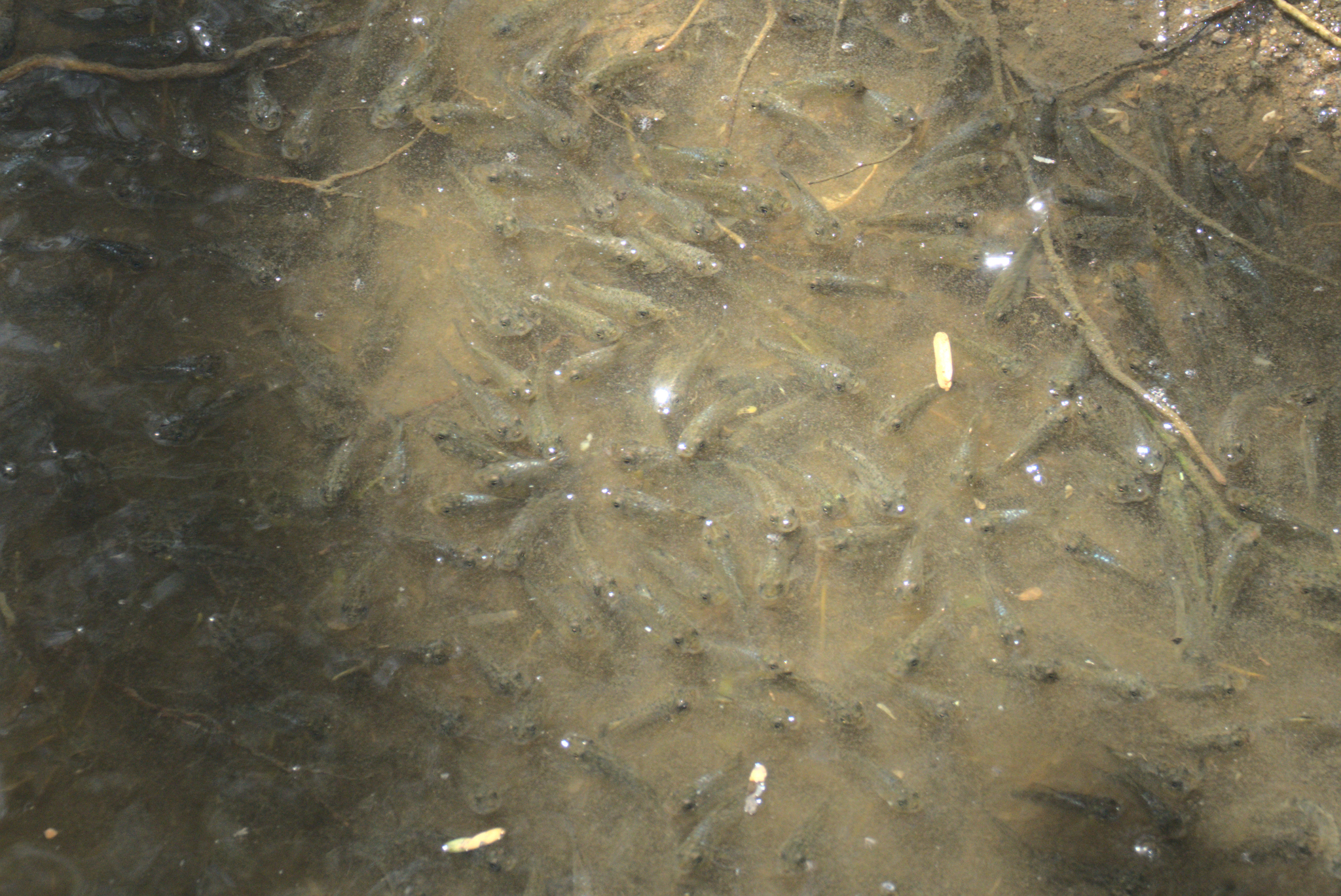
Cyprinodon dearborni can survive in very shallow water and reach a high population density.

Desiccation is a major cause of mass mortalities, especially in shallow salinas where salinity can climb above 150‰ or the water can vanish entirely. In many shrinking pools, most fish succumb once salinity reaches roughly 50‰ because oxygen levels collapse. Cyprinodon dearborni avoids suffocation by retreating into very shallow margins only a few centimeters deep, where oxygen rarely falls below about 75% saturation. Although the species cannot survive the complete drying of a site, it can endure for several days sheltered under stones or trapped among algae so long as a thin layer of water remains. Its eggs can still hatch after spending five days in damp algae or gravel.

Examination of the gut contents indicates that the staple food of Cyprinodon dearborni consists of single-celled blue-green algae. Plant fragments, small invertebrates living on submerged surfaces, and tiny copepods have also been found in freshwater specimens, while individuals from marine lagoons additionally take in protozoans and copepod larvae. In extremely salty bays, swarms of Artemia salina—particularly the larval stages—make up much of the available prey, whereas larvae of Ephydra appear only sporadically in the diet. The pupfish do not cannibalize their fry, but do consume eggs, especially in densely populated landlocked habitats.

Willemstad pupfish do not appear to compete for food amongst themselves; even in highly dense populations, all examined individuals were well-fed with algae. The ability to subsist on a diet of almost inexhaustible blue-green algae gives the pupfish an advantage over its interspecific competitors, Kryptolebias marmoratus and Poecilia vandepolli. While in marine habitats the pupfish may coexist with either or both species, the three exclude one another in isolated waters.

Cyprinodon dearborni is not susceptible to parasites; only occasionally the pupfish may be attacked by nematodes, trematodes, and parasitic copepods, but never fatally. In marine settings, the pupfish face heavy predation from a wide range of fishes, with juvenile barracudas, snappers, and groupers observed striking at full-grown individuals. Even more species target the young, including Gobius soporator and Poecilia vandepolli. In isolated inland waters this pressure is largely absent, since the pupfish is usually the only fish present; instead, birds become the principal hunters. Three groups play a role: terns, herons, and—more rarely—flamingos, especially juveniles.

== Reproduction ==
Cyprinodon dearborni reproduces by laying eggs and does so throughout the year. Males adopt steel-blue nuptial colors with an orange throat and chest, and each guards a compact patch of ground, typically about 50 x 50 cm, though these plots can shrink to roughly 15 x 15 cm in crowded populations. A ripe female entering such a plot is initially met with an aggressive display, but if she remains passive and stays within the male's space, he begins a quivering motion at the site where a cluster of several dozen eggs will be deposited. Spawning usually takes place on mats of blue-green or filamentous green algae, though pebbles or muddy surfaces may also serve as the base. Once the eggs are laid, the female departs, leaving the male to guard the clutch, and it is common for eggs from multiple females to accumulate in the same nesting spot.

After hatching, the juveniles receive no further care; they remain close to the substrate, sheltering among stones and within the algae. They reach maturity after about three months at the size of 2.3 cm (0.91 in) and their growth then slows down; after half a year, they are 3 cm (1.2 in) long. The maximum size is about 4.8 cm (1.9 in).
