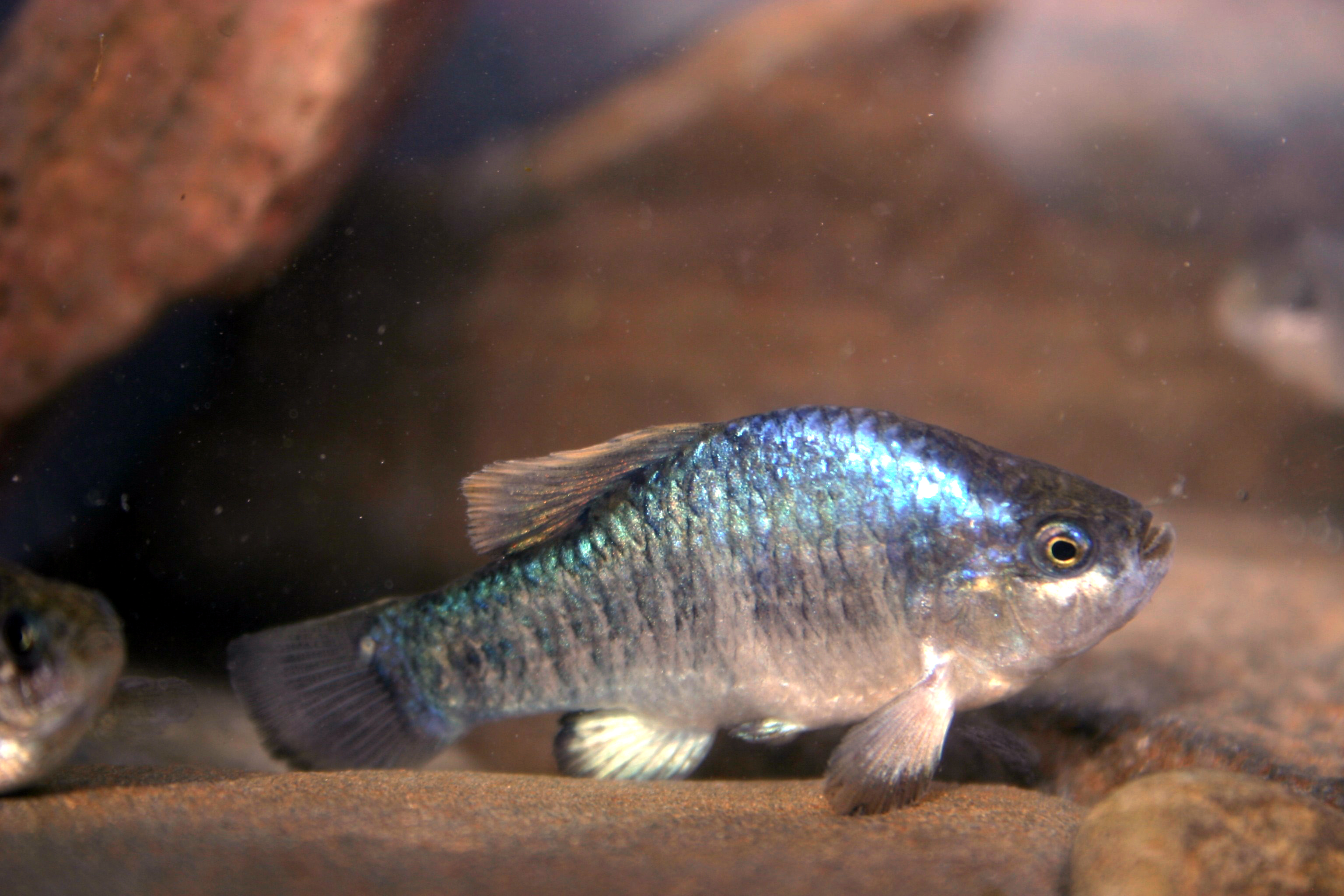
- Cyprinodon radiosus

Scientific classification
- Kingdom: Animalia
- Phylum: Chordata
- Class: Actinopterygii
- Division: Teleostei
- Order: Cyprinodontiformes
- Family: Cyprinodontidae
- Subfamily: Cyprinodontinae
- Genus: Cyprinodon; Lacépède, 1803

Type species
- Cyprinodon variegatus Lacépède, 1803

Synonyms
- Encrates Gistel, 1848; Lebia Oken, 1817; Prinodon Rafinesque, 1815; Trifarcius Poey, 1860

= Cyprinodon =

Cyprinodon Temporal range: Late Miocene–present

Genus of fishes

Cyprinodon is a genus of pupfishes found in waters that range from fresh to hypersaline. The genus is primarily found in Mexico, the Caribbean Islands and southern United States (Arizona, California, Florida, Nevada, New Mexico, Oklahoma and Texas), but C. variegatus occurs as far north as Massachusetts and along the entire Gulf of Mexico coastline, and C. dearborni and C. variegatus are found in northern South America. Many species have tiny ranges and are highly threatened, in some cases already extinct. Cyprinodon are small; the largest reaches 10 cm (3.9 in) in length and most other species only reach about half that size.

== Evolution ==
Based on phylogenetic evidence, Cyprinodon diverged from its closest relative, the recently extinct Megupsilon, during the Late Miocene, and saw a rapid evolutionary radiation afterwards. The only known fossil species from the genus is C. breviradius from the late Miocene or early Pliocene-aged sediments of Death Valley National Park (originally considered part of the Late Eocene-aged Titus Canyon Formation).

== Distribution and habitat ==
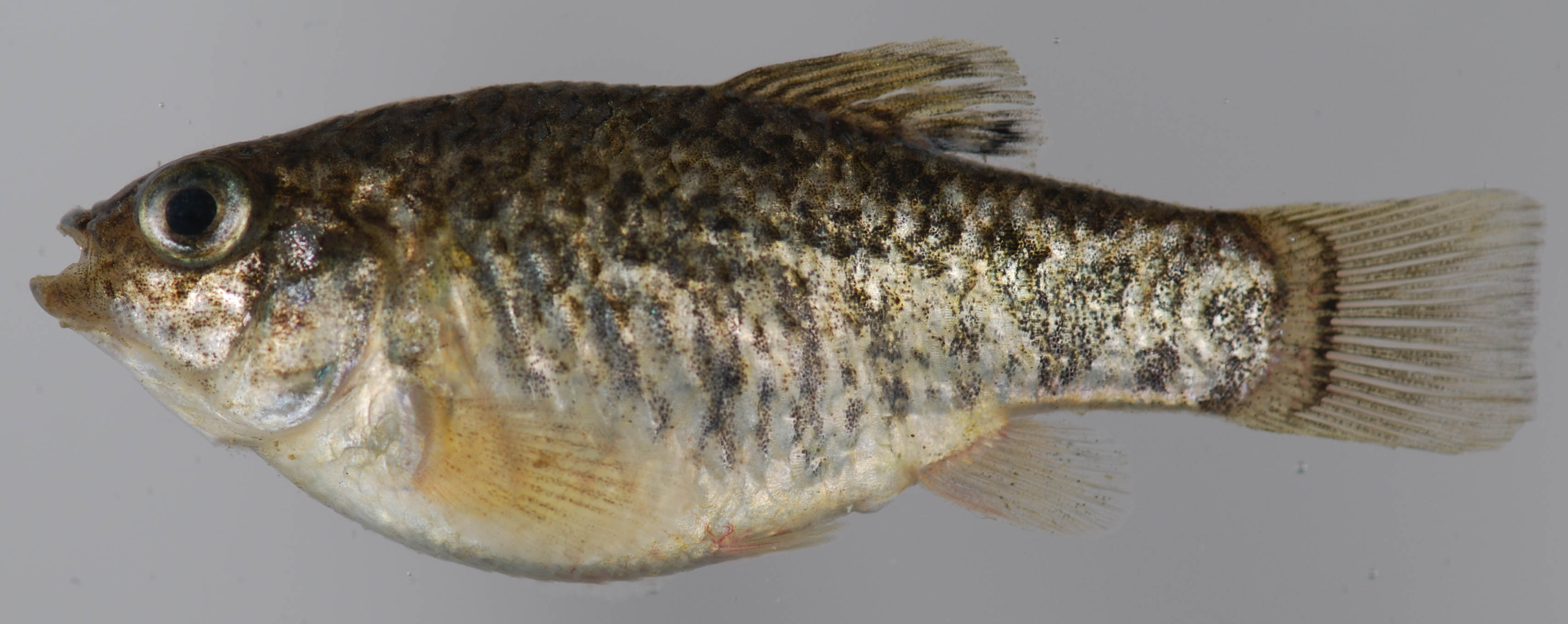
Cyprinodon variegatus is the most widespread member of the genus.

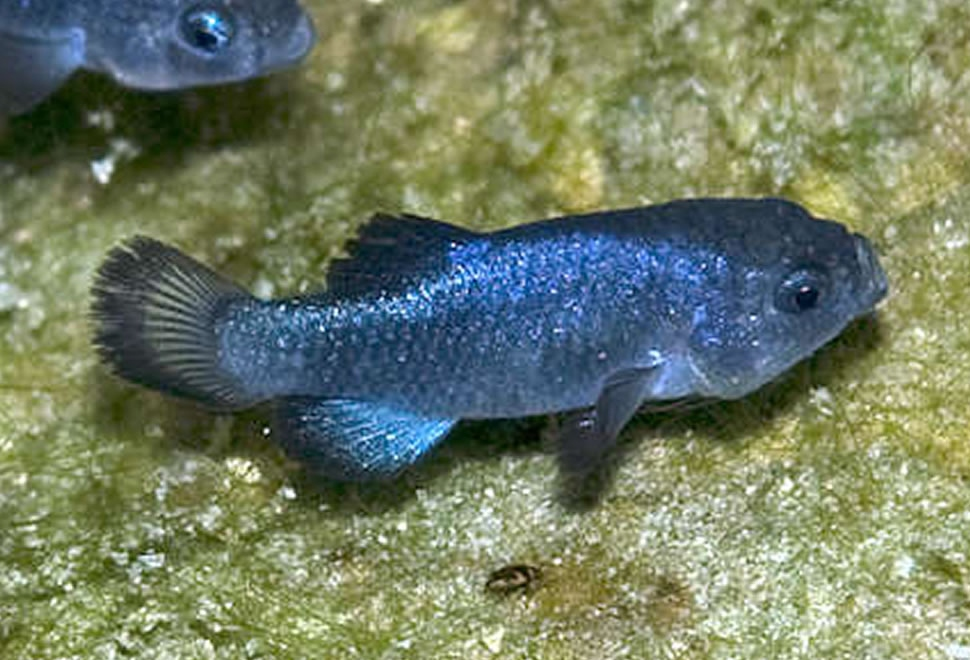
Cyprinodon diabolis is very rare; its entire native range is the Devils Hole in Nevada

A few Cyprinodon species have quite large ranges, notably C. variegatus, but the vast majority have small ranges, typically restricted to one or two Mexican states or U.S. states, Hispaniola, or a Bahamian island. C. longidorsalis and C. diabolis have both been said to have the smallest native range of any vertebrate species, with the former being restricted to a spring pool that covers about 10 m^{2} (110 sq ft) and the latter to an 18 m^{2} (190 sq ft) shelf in a spring pool, but C. longidorsalis is now only found in captivity as its habitat has disappeared. While most Cyprinodon species have separate distributions, seven (C. beltrani, C. esconditus, C. labiosus, C. maya, C. simus, C. suavium and C. verecundus) are endemic in Lake Chichancanab in Quintana Roo, Mexico, and three (the endemic C. brontotheroides and C. desquamator, and the widespread C. variegatus) live in the hypersaline lakes on San Salvador Island in the Bahamas. In a few other cases separate species do come into contact towards the edges of their distributions where they often hybridize, notably C. eximius with C. pachycephalus and C. atrorus with C. bifasciatus, but also C. variegatus in places where it has been introduced by humans into the ranges of other Cyprinodon species.

Although the individual Cyprinodon species often have a highly specific habitat, overall the genus occurs in a remarkable range of places, such as springs (including those isolated in deserts), pools, lakes, coastal lagoons, creeks, streams and rivers. Their salinity and temperature range is very broad, like those living in hot springs (taken to the extreme in C. julimes in water up to 46 °C or 115 °F, and C. pachycephalus up to 49 °C or 120 °F), and those of hypersaline habitats where the salinity far exceeds that of sea water. Certain species may even experience very large variations in the temperature and salinity over a relatively short period. For example, some populations of C. variegatus live in water where the temperature has been known to change from 15 to −1.8 °C (59 to 29 °F) in less than 24 hours (in the coldest temperatures they bury into the substrate). Some populations of C. nevadensis tolerate water temperatures between 2 and 44 °C (36–111 °F), and C. salinus live in waters where the temperature may change by as much as 19 °C (34 °F) in a day and 40 °C (72 °F) in a season. Furthermore, the salinity of C. salinus' habitat may vary from less than one-third of that of sea water to almost five times as much as sea water in a season.

== Conservation status ==
Most species in the genus are seriously threatened. C. arcuatus, C. ceciliae, C. inmemoriam, C. nevadensis calidae and an undescribed species popularly known as the "Perrito de Sandia" are already extinct. C. arcuatus was restricted to springs in the US state of Arizona and probably also in the Mexican state of Sonora, while all the others were restricted to spring systems in Mexico.

Three species from southwestern Nuevo León, C. alvarezi, C. longidorsalis and C. veronicae, have become extinct in the wild, only surviving in captivity. A few other Mexican species still considered endangered or vulnerable by the IUCN, including at least C. maya, C. simus and C. verecundus of Lake Chichancanab, also appear to only survive in captivity. Several others have very small remaining populations in the wild. Among the species that survive in the wild, the rarest is perhaps C. diabolis from the tiny Devils Hole in Nevada; in recent decades its population has fluctuated between a few tens and a few hundred individuals. Primary threats to pupfish are habitat loss due to water extraction, drought and pollution, and introduced species.

== Behavior ==
=== Feeding ===
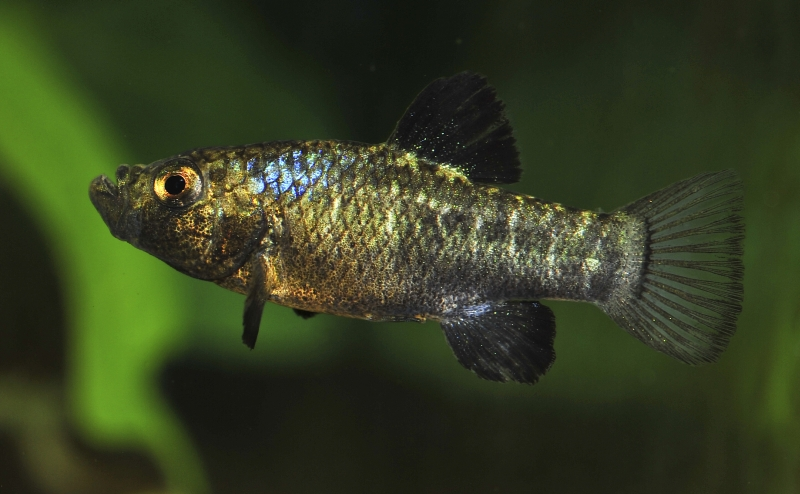
Cyprinodon desquamator, the only known scale-eating species of pupfish

Most Cyprinodon species feed on algae, cyanobacteria and detritus, but may also supplement their diet with small crustaceans and aquatic insect larvae. Some species mainly feed on small animals like aquatic insects. C. variegatus, a species that otherwise has a diet typical of pupfish, will clean other fish by feeding on parasites on their body.

In the two places where several species live together they have diverged into different niches, including the fish-eating C. maya (Lake Chichancanab), zooplankton-eating C. simus (Lake Chichancanab), amphipod- and bivalve-eating C. labiosus and C. verecundus (Lake Chichancanab), scale-eating C. desquamator (San Salvador Island lakes), and ostracod- and gastropod-eating C. brontotheroides (San Salvador Island lakes).

=== Breeding ===
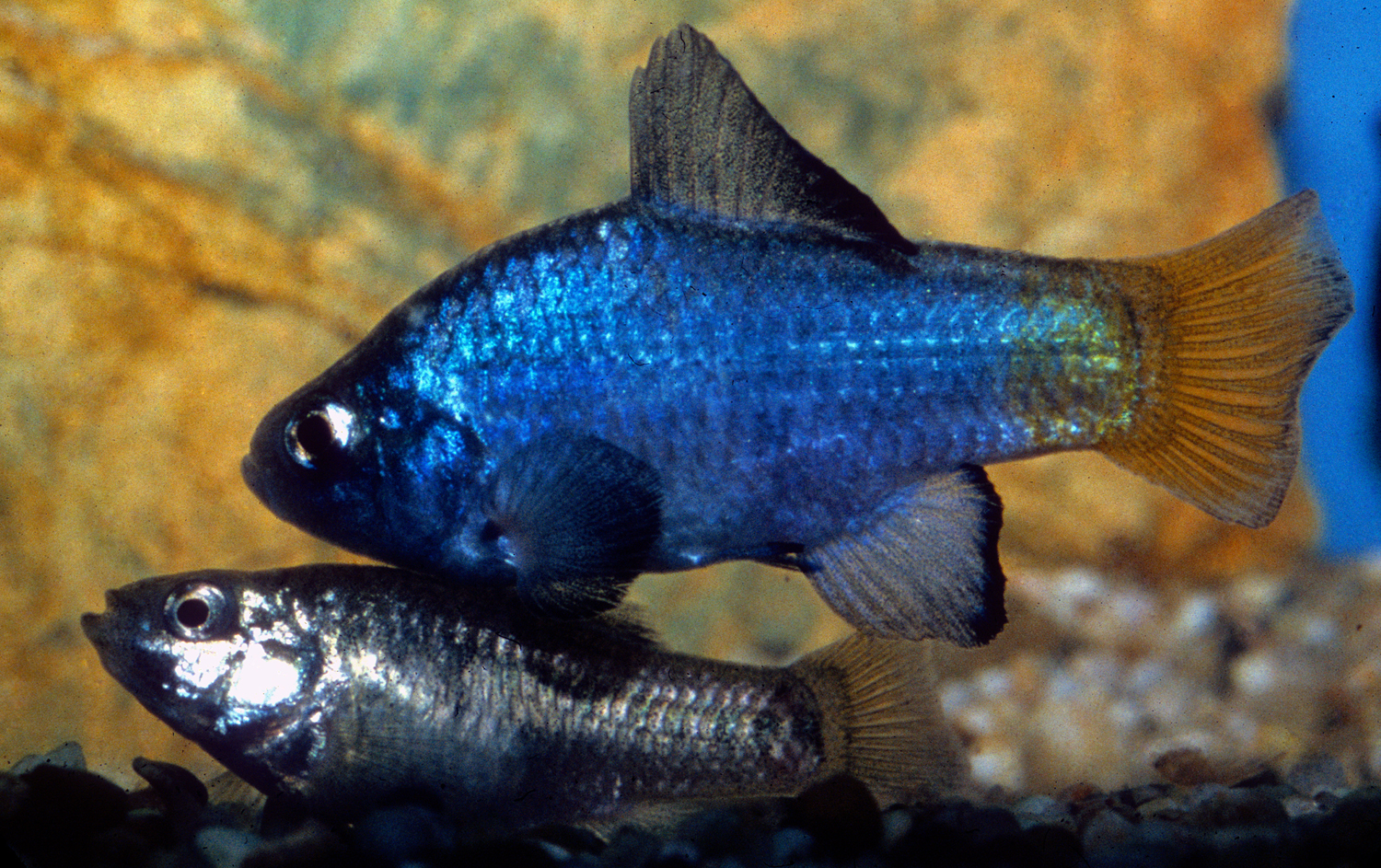
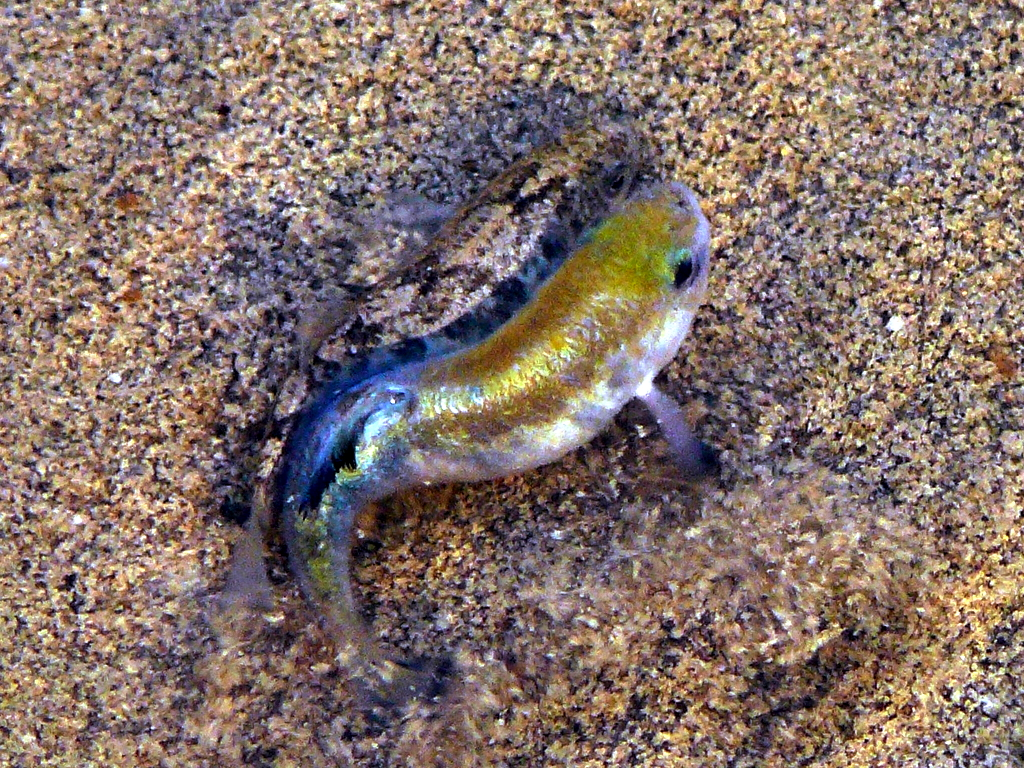
On left: Cyprinodon macularius pair during courtship (male above).
On right: Cyprinodon salinus pair during spawning (male with yellowish back).

Cyprinodon pupfish are short-lived, typically reaching an age of no more than a year in the wild, although some may reach as much as three years. Especially those from habitats that experience major environmental fluctuations (for example, large variations in temperature) rapidly reach maturity and are already able to breed when 1–1.5 month old. Despite some species' ability to survive in a wide temperature range, their requirements for breeding often are much more specific. For example, although some populations of C. nevadensis can live in water that ranges between 2 and 44 °C (36–111 °F), they only breed from 24 to 30 °C (75–86 °F). However, there are exceptions like C. rubrofluviatilis that will breed at a relative wide range from 13 to 34 °C (55–93 °F). Consequently, pupfish living in stable habitats breed year-round, but those in more seasonal habitats generally only at certain times of the year where the conditions are optimal. When breeding, males assume a relatively bright nuptial coloration.

There are two primary breeding strategies: In species of small isolated habitats like springs, each large male (or medium-sized male, if large males are absent) defends a territory and displays to visiting females that will lay their eggs inside the territory. In at least some species, small males will attempt to fertilize eggs by sneaking into a territory of a larger male. Once deposited, neither sex cares for the eggs, although they do get a level of protection by being inside the territory of a male. A male will attempt to attract several females to lay their eggs in his territory and a female may lay eggs in the territories of several males. Another breeding strategy is used by species that inhabit rivers. Here the males do not maintain a territory and groups of pupfish gather to breed. A male typically will lead a female to the edge of the group to spawn, although on occasion it may occur in the middle of the group. The eggs of Cyprinodon pupfish are adhesive and stick to the substrate, or they are covered in sand.

== Species ==
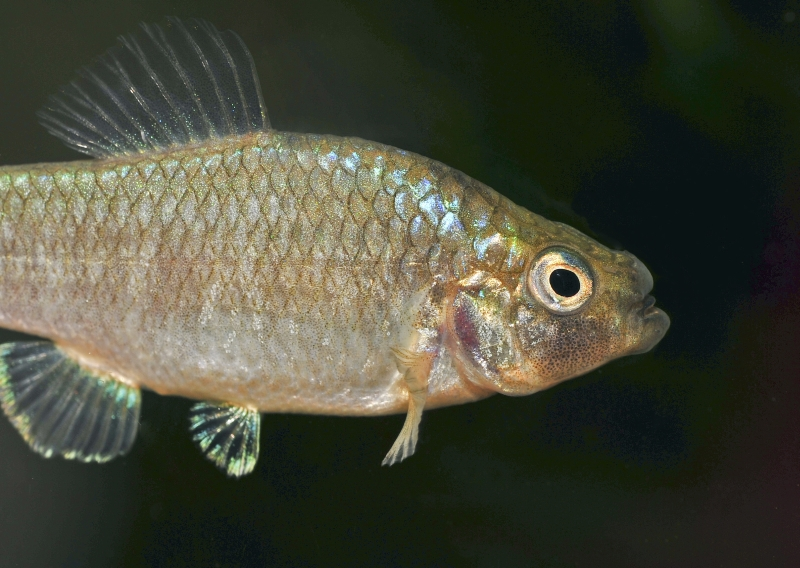
Cyprinodon brontotheroides (shown) and C. desquamator are both restricted to hypersaline lakes in the Bahamas

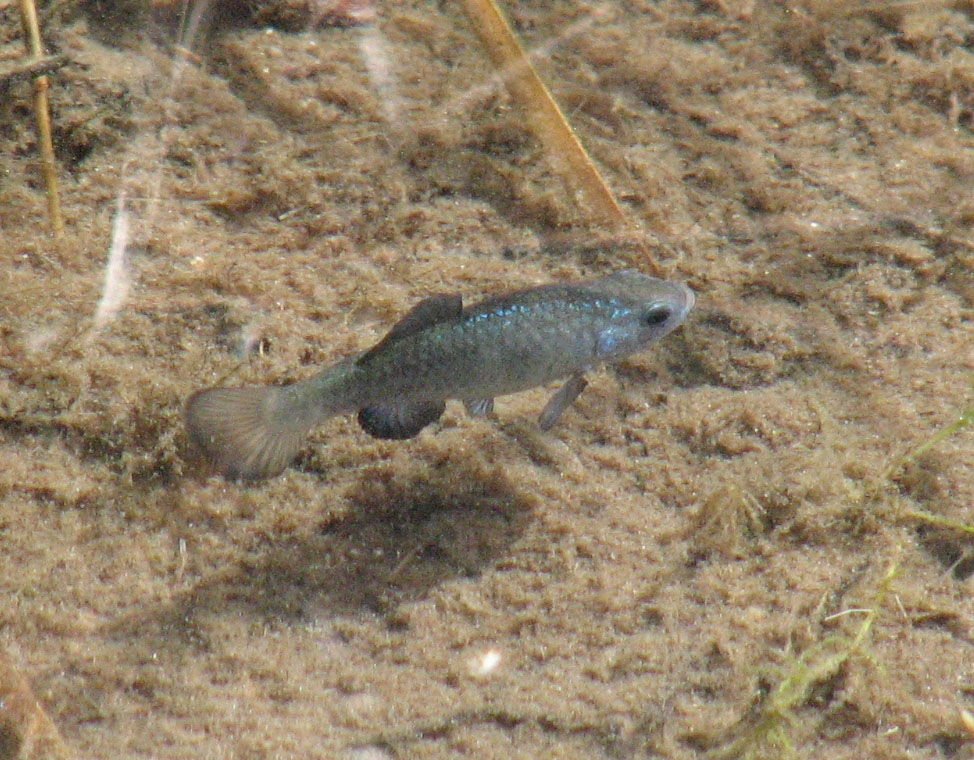
Cyprinodon eremus in shallow water, which is preferred by most species in this genus

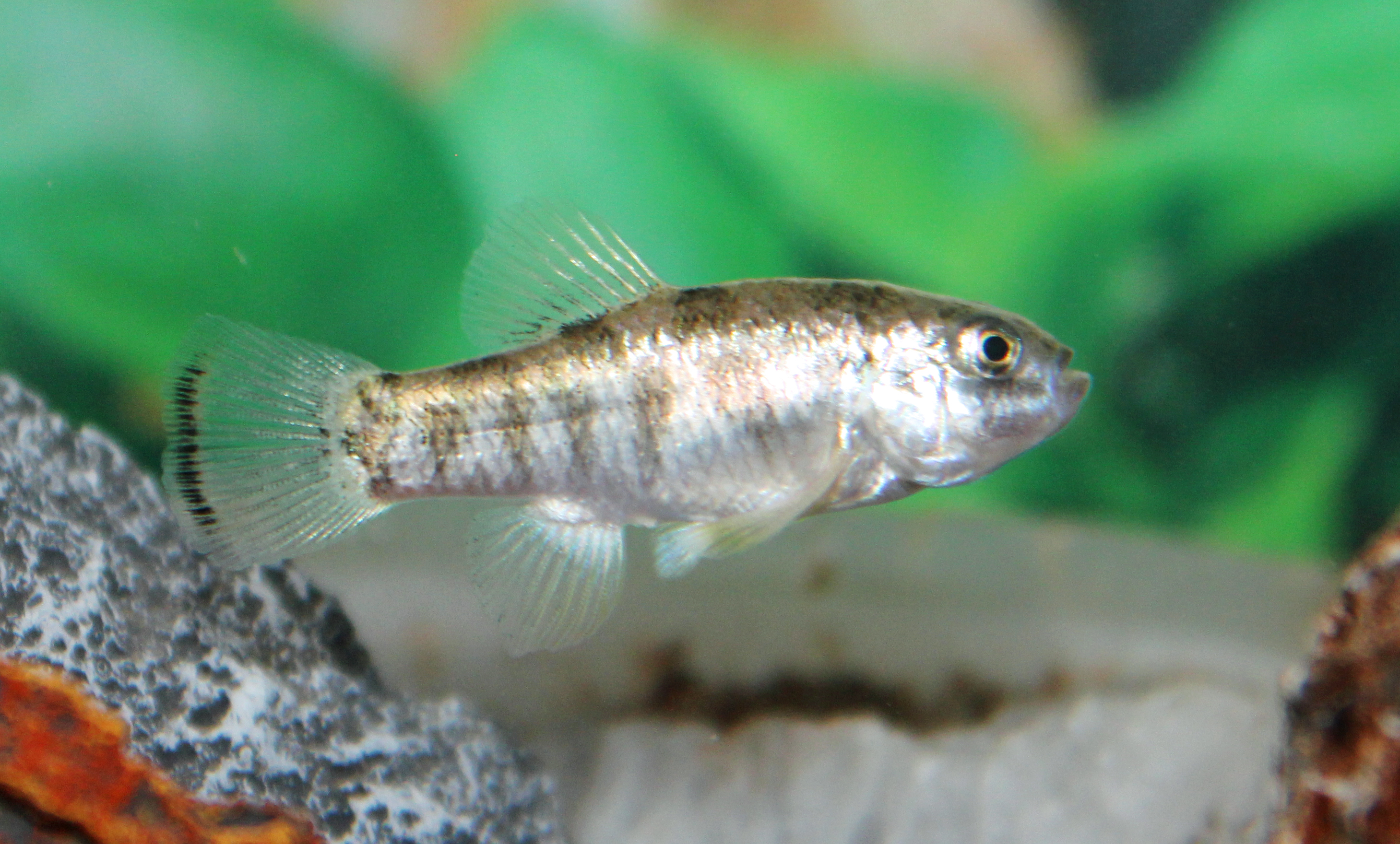
Cyprinodon julimes was only scientifically described in 2009.

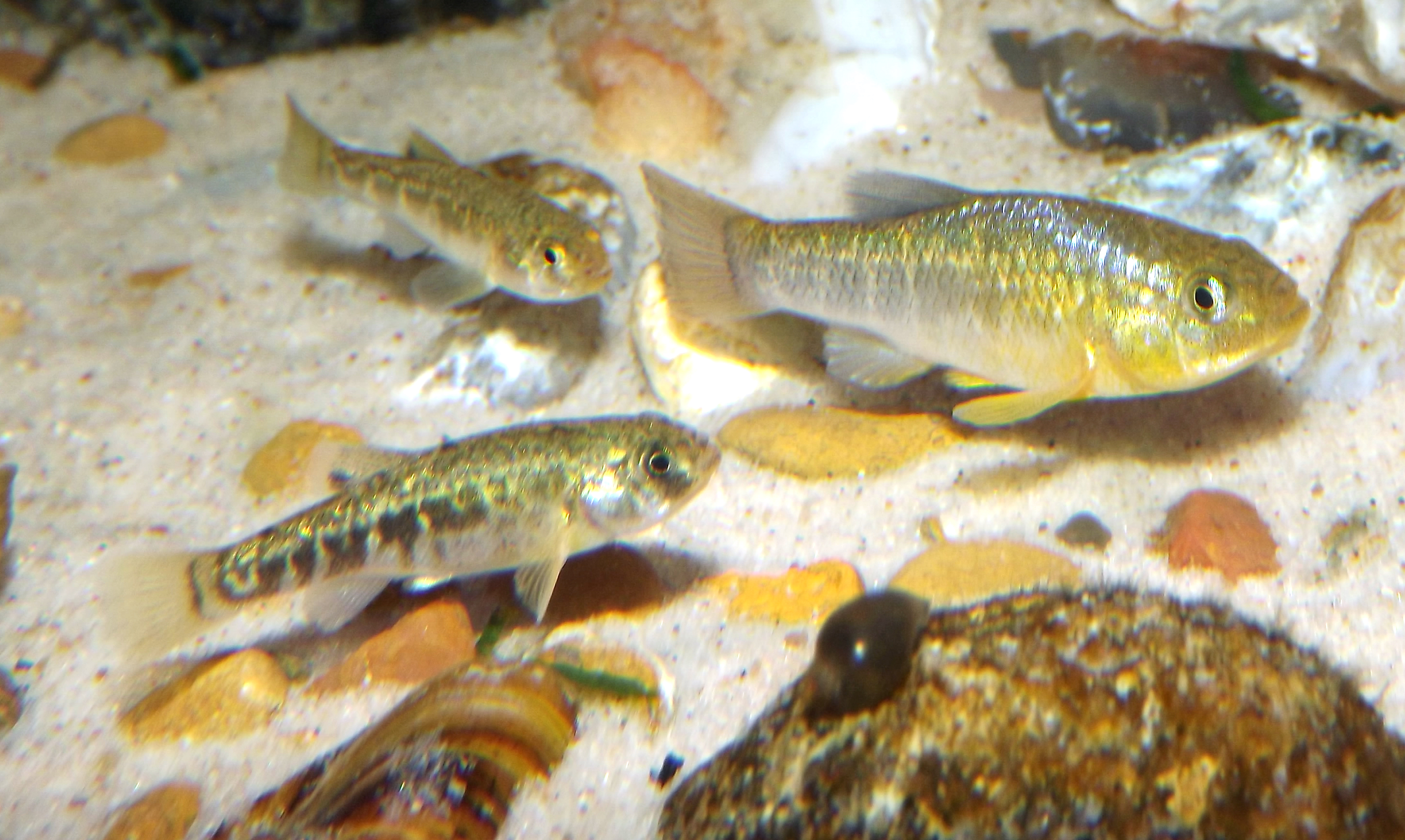
Cyprinodon rubrofluviatilis, a relatively common species from Texas

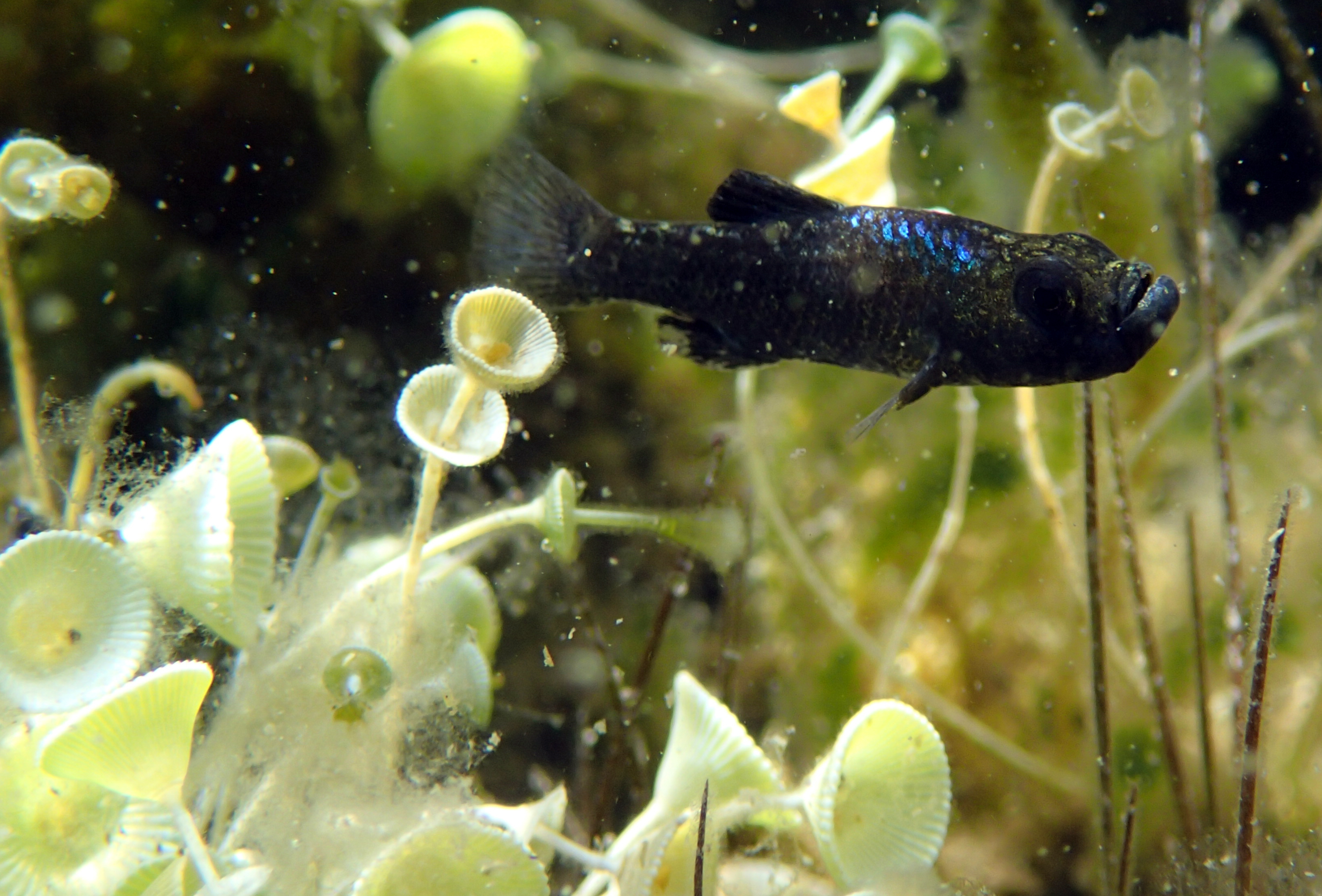
Cyprinodon desquamator (shown), the scale-eating pupfish, in its natural habitat on San Salvador Island, Bahamas

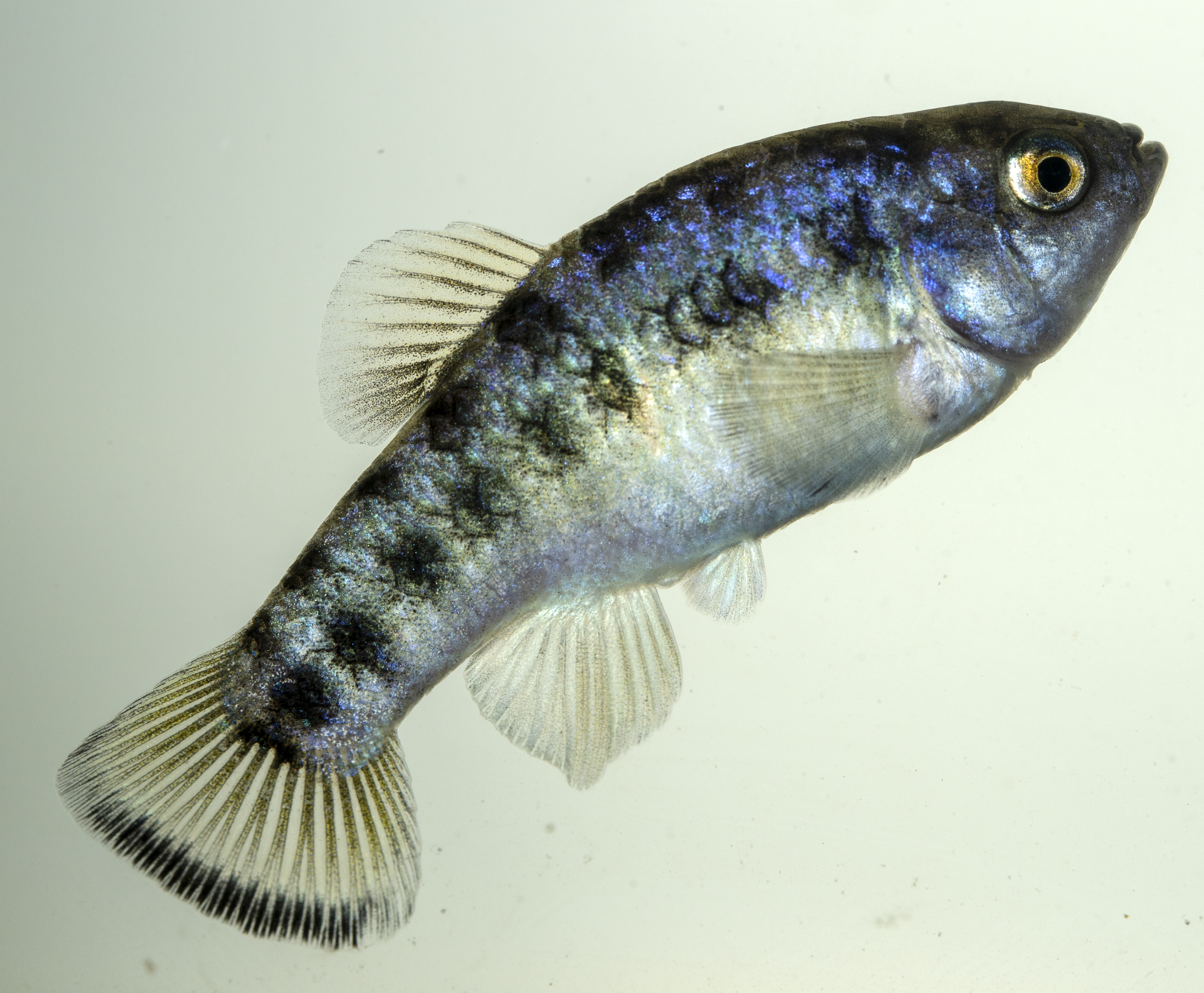
Cyprinodon macrolepis male in an aquarium.

There are currently 49 recognized species in this genus:

- Cyprinodon albivelis W. L. Minckley & R. R. Miller, 2002 (Whitefin pupfish)
- Cyprinodon alvarezi R. R. Miller, 1976 (Potosi pupfish)
- †Cyprinodon arcuatus W. L. Minckley & R. R. Miller, 2002 (Santa Cruz pupfish)
- Cyprinodon artifrons C. L. Hubbs, 1936 (Yucatán pupfish)
- Cyprinodon atrorus R. R. Miller, 1968 (Bolson pupfish)
- Cyprinodon beltrani Álvarez, 1949 (Blackfin pupfish)
- Cyprinodon bifasciatus R. R. Miller, 1968 (Cuatro Cienegas pupfish)
- Cyprinodon bobmilleri Lozano-Vilano & Contreras-Balderas, 1999 (San Ignacio pupfish)
- Cyprinodon bondi G. S. Myers, 1935 (Hispaniola pupfish)
- Cyprinodon bovinus S. F. Baird & Girard, 1853 (Leon Springs pupfish)
- †Cyprinodon breviradius R. R. Miller, 1945 (fossil; Late Miocene/Early Pliocene of California)
- Cyprinodon brontotheroides C. H. Martin & Wainwright, 2013 (Durophage pupfish)
- †Cyprinodon ceciliae Lozano-Vilano & Contreras-Balderas, 1993 (Villa Lopez pupfish)
- Cyprinodon dearborni Meek, 1909
- Cyprinodon desquamator C. H. Martin & Wainwright, 2013 (Scale-eating pupfish)
- Cyprinodon diabolis Wales, 1930 (Devil's Hole pupfish)
- Cyprinodon elegans S. F. Baird & Girard, 1853 (Comanche Springs pupfish)
- Cyprinodon eremus R. R. Miller & Fuiman, 1987 (Sonoyta pupfish)
- Cyprinodon esconditus Strecker, 2002 (Hidden pupfish)
- Cyprinodon eximius Girard, 1859 (Conchos pupfish)
- Cyprinodon fontinalis M. L. Smith & R. R. Miller, 1980 (Carbonera pupfish)
- Cyprinodon higuey C. M. Rodriguez & M. L. Smith, 1990 (Black-and-blue Pupfish)
- Cyprinodon hubbsi Carr, 1936 (Lake Eustis minnow)
- †Cyprinodon inmemoriam Lozano-Vilano & Contreras-Balderas, 1993 (Charco Azul pupfish)
- Cyprinodon julimes De la Maza-Benignos & Vela-Valladares, 2009 (Julimes pupfish)
- Cyprinodon labiosus Humphries & R. R. Miller, 1981 (Thicklip pupfish)
- Cyprinodon laciniatus C. L. Hubbs & R. R. Miller, 1942 (Bahama pupfish)
- Cyprinodon latifasciatus Garman, 1881 (Parras pupfish)
- Cyprinodon longidorsalis Lozano-Vilano & Contreras-Balderas, 1993 (La Palma pupfish)
- Cyprinodon macrolepis R. R. Miller, 1976 (Largescale pupfish)
- Cyprinodon macularius S. F. Baird & Girard, 1853 (Desert pupfish)
- Cyprinodon maya Humphries & R. R. Miller, 1981 (Maya pupfish)
- Cyprinodon meeki R. R. Miller, 1976 (Mezquital pupfish)
- Cyprinodon nazas R. R. Miller, 1976 (Nazas pupfish)
- Cyprinodon nevadensis C. H. Eigenmann & R. S. Eigenmann, 1889
  - Cyprinodon nevadensis amargosae R. R. Miller, 1948 (Amargosa River pupfish)
  - †Cyprinodon nevadensis calidae R. R. Miller, 1948 (Tecopa pupfish)
  - Cyprinodon nevadensis mionectes R. R. Miller, 1948 (Ash Meadows pupfish)
  - Cyprinodon nevadensis nevadensis C. H. Eigenmann & R. S. Eigenmann, 1889 (Amargosa pupfish)
  - Cyprinodon nevadensis pectoralis R. R. Miller, 1948 (Warm Springs pupfish)
  - Cyprinodon nevadensis shoshone R. R. Miller, 1948 (Shoshone pupfish)
- Cyprinodon nichollsi M. L. Smith, 1989 (Jaragua pupfish)
- Cyprinodon pachycephalus W. L. Minckley & C. O. Minckley, 1986 (Bighead pupfish)
- Cyprinodon pecosensis A. A. Echelle & A. F. Echelle, 1978 (Pecos pupfish)
- Cyprinodon pisteri R. R. Miller & W. L. Minckley, 2002 (Palomas pupfish)
- Cyprinodon radiosus R. R. Miller, 1948 (Owens pupfish)
- Cyprinodon riverendi (Poey, 1860) (synonym: Cyprinodon jamaicensis, Fowler, 1939)
- Cyprinodon rubrofluviatilis Fowler, 1916 (Red River pupfish)
- Cyprinodon salinus R. R. Miller, 1943
  - Cyprinodon salinus milleri LaBounty & Deacon, 1972 (Cottonball marsh pupfish)
  - Cyprinodon salinus salinus R. R. Miller, 1943 (Death Valley pupfish, Salt Creek pupfish)
- Cyprinodon salvadori Lozano-Vilano, 2002 (Bocochi pupfish)
- Cyprinodon simus Humphries & R. R. Miller, 1981 (Boxer pupfish)
- Cyprinodon suavium Strecker, 2005
- Cyprinodon tularosa R. R. Miller & A. A. Echelle, 1975 (White Sands pupfish)
- Cyprinodon variegatus (Lacépède, 1803)
  - Cyprinodon variegatus baconi Breder, 1932
  - Cyprinodon variegatus ovinus (Mitchill, 1815)
  - Cyprinodon variegatus variegatus (Lacépède, 1803) (Sheepshead minnow)
- Cyprinodon verecundus Humphries, 1984 (Largefin pupfish)
- Cyprinodon veronicae Lozano-Vilano & Contreras-Balderas, 1993 (Charco Palma pupfish)
