= Maya pupfish =

Conservation status
- Vulnerable (IUCN 3.1)

Scientific classification
- Kingdom: Animalia
- Phylum: Chordata
- Class: Actinopterygii
- Order: Cyprinodontiformes
- Family: Cyprinodontidae
- Genus: Cyprinodon
- Species: C. maya

Binomial name
- Cyprinodon maya Humphries & R. R. Miller, 1981

Species of fish

The Maya pupfish (Cyprinodon maya), known in Spanish as cachorrito gigante, is a highly threatened species of fish in the family Cyprinodontidae. It is endemic to Lake Chichancanab in Quintana Roo, Mexico. In almost all places, different Cyprinodon species do not overlap in their range, but there are two notable exceptions and one of these is Lake Chichancanab, which is inhabited by C. maya, C. beltrani, C. esconditus, C. labiosus, C. simus, C. suavium and C. verecundus (the other place where several Cyprinodon species live together are lakes in San Salvador Island, the Bahamas). Living together, the Cyprinodon species in Lake Chichancanab have diverged into different niches. Pupfish typically feed on algae and detritus. In Lake Chichancanab, however, C. maya has become not only the largest species in the genus Cyprinodon, up to 10 cm (3.9 in) long, but also the only that catches and eats whole fish (C. desquamator of San Salvador Island is a scale-eater). In smaller quantities it eats ostracods and freshwater snails.

Among the endemic Cyprinodon species in Lake Chichancanab, only C. beltrani and C. labiosus still occur in some numbers in their habitat, while the remaining are virtually—if not fully—extinct in the wild. At least some of these, including C. maya, survive in captivity. The primary reason for their decline is introduced species, notably the Nile tilapia and the tetra Astyanax fasciatus.
