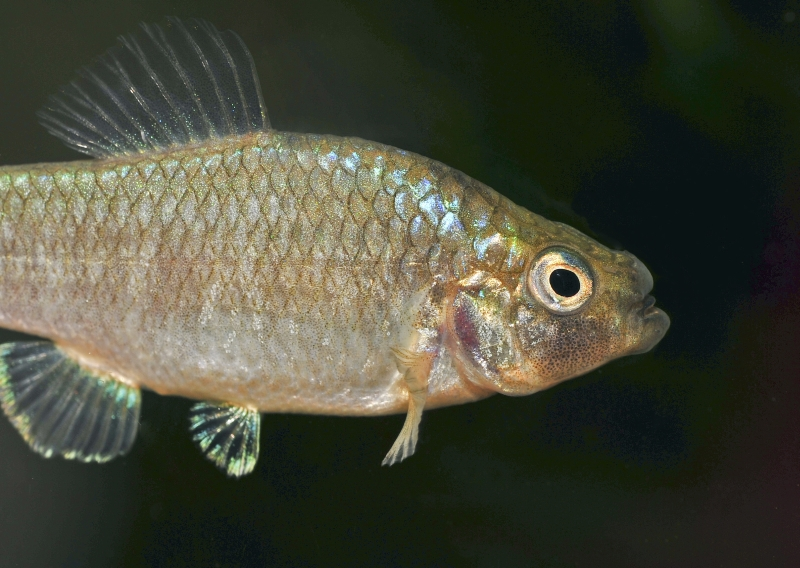

Conservation status
- Least Concern (IUCN 3.1)

Scientific classification
- Kingdom: Animalia
- Phylum: Chordata
- Class: Actinopterygii
- Order: Cyprinodontiformes
- Family: Cyprinodontidae
- Genus: Cyprinodon
- Species: C. brontotheroides

Binomial name
- Cyprinodon brontotheroides C. H. Martin & Wainwright, 2013

= Cyprinodon brontotheroides =

Species of fish

Cyprinodon brontotheroides, the molluscivore or durophage pupfish, is a species of ray-finned fish belonging to the family Cyprinodontidae, the killifishes. This species is endemic to San Salvador Island in the Bahamas.

== Taxonomy ==
Cyprinodon brontotheroides was first formally described in 2013 by Christopher H. Martin and Peter C. Wainwright with its type locality given as Crescent Pond, San Salvador Island. The genus Cyprinodon is classified within the pupfish subfamily, Cyprinodontinae, belonging to the killifish family, Cyprinodontidae, which belongs to the suborder Cyprinodontoidei of the order Cyprinodontiformes.

== Etymology ==
Cyprinodon brontotheroides belongs to the genus Cyprinodon, a name which combines Cyprinus, which means "carp" or "minnow", with "odon, meaning "tooth", in other words a carp- or cyprinid-like fish but with teeth, i.e. a toothcarp. The specific name, brontotheroides, suffixed -oides onto the name of the extinct family of Perissodactyla, the brontotheres. This is an allusion to the similarity of the protruding nasal region of this fish to the "bizarre" horn-like skull appendages of brontotheres.

== Description ==
Cyprinodon brontotheroides is durophagous. It has a large in-lever to out-lever ratio for closing its lower jaw with force and a protruding, reinforced nasal region probably used for crushing its specialized diet of ostracods and gastropods. They breed in the spring and the breeding territories are guarded by the males.

== Distribution and habitat ==
Cyprinodon brontotheroides is endemic to hypersaline interior lakes on San Salvador Island, Bahamas.

== Ecology ==
Cyprinodon brontotheroides coexists alongside two other closely related Cyprinodon species C. desquamator and C. variegatus. Together, these three species represent a recent adaptive radiation, each having moved into a difference niche within their specialized environment. Each of these species are defined by distinct trophic adaptations that have affected various aspects of functional morphology.
