= Largefin pupfish =

Conservation status
- Vulnerable (IUCN 3.1)

Scientific classification
- Kingdom: Animalia
- Phylum: Chordata
- Class: Actinopterygii
- Order: Cyprinodontiformes
- Family: Cyprinodontidae
- Genus: Cyprinodon
- Species: C. verecundus

Binomial name
- Cyprinodon verecundus Humphries, 1984

Species of fish

The largefin pupfish (Cyprinodon verecundus), also known as cachorrito de dorsal larga, is a small species of pupfish in the family Cyprinodontidae. It is endemic to Lake Chichancanab in Quintana Roo, Mexico. In almost all places, different Cyprinodon species do not overlap in their range, but there are two notable exceptions and one of these is Lake Chichancanab, which is inhabited by C. verecundus, C. beltrani, C. esconditus, C. labiosus, C. maya, C. simus and C. suavium (the other place where several Cyprinodon species live together are lakes in San Salvador Island, the Bahamas). Living together, the Cyprinodon species in Lake Chichancanab have diverged into different niches. Pupfish typically feed on algae and detritus. In Lake Chichancanab, however, C. verecundus has become an amphipod- and bivalve-eater.

The IUCN last reviewed C. verecundus in 2019 when it considered the species to be vulnerable to extinction. Among the endemic Cyprinodon species in Lake Chichancanab, only C. beltrani and C. labiosus still occur in some numbers in their habitat, while the remaining are virtually—if not fully—extinct in the wild. At least some of these, including C. verecundus, survive in captivity. The primary reason for their decline is introduced species, notably the Nile tilapia and the tetra Astyanax fasciatus.
