= Boxer pupfish =

Conservation status
- Near Threatened (IUCN 3.1)

Scientific classification
- Kingdom: Animalia
- Phylum: Chordata
- Class: Actinopterygii
- Order: Cyprinodontiformes
- Family: Cyprinodontidae
- Genus: Cyprinodon
- Species: C. simus

Binomial name
- Cyprinodon simus Humphries & R. R. Miller, 1981

Species of fish

The boxer pupfish (Cyprinodon simus) is a small species of pupfish in the family Cyprinodontidae. It is endemic to Lake Chichancanab in Quintana Roo, Mexico.

In almost all places, different Cyprinodon species do not overlap in their range, but there are two notable exceptions. One of these is Lake Chichancanab, which is inhabited by C. simus, C. beltrani, C. esconditus, C. labiosus, C. maya, C. suavium and C. verecundus (the other place where several Cyprinodon species live together is lakes in San Salvador Island, the Bahamas). Living together, the Cyprinodon species in Lake Chichancanab have diverged into different niches. Pupfish typically feed on algae and detritus. In Lake Chichancanab, however, C. simus has become a zooplankton-feeder. It once occurred in large schools, but has declined drastically due primarily to introduced species (Nile tilapia and the tetra Astyanax fasciatus). Among the endemic Cyprinodon species in Lake Chichancanab, only C. beltrani and C. labiosus still occur in some numbers in their habitat, while the remaining are virtually—if not fully—extinct in the wild (at least some of these, including C. simus, still survive in captivity). However, a specimen of C. simus was recorded in the wild in 2009.
