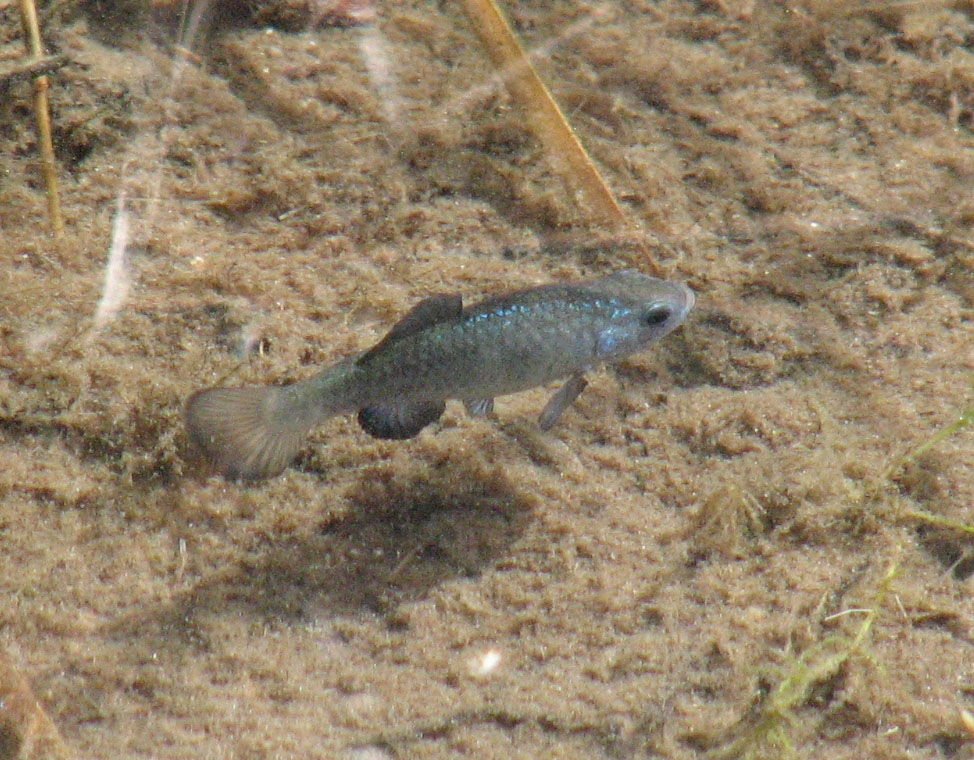
- A Quitobaquito pupfish in Organ Pipe Cactus National Monument, Arizona

Conservation status
- Endangered (IUCN 3.1)

Scientific classification
- Kingdom: Animalia
- Phylum: Chordata
- Class: Actinopterygii
- Order: Cyprinodontiformes
- Family: Cyprinodontidae
- Genus: Cyprinodon
- Species: C. eremus

Binomial name
- Cyprinodon eremus R. R. Miller & Fuiman, 1987

Synonyms
- Cyprinodon macularius eremus

= Sonoyta pupfish =

Species of fish

The Sonoyta pupfish or Quitobaquito pupfish (Cyprinodon eremus) is an endangered species of pupfish from Sonora in Mexico and Arizona in the United States.

Originally, it was considered to be a subspecies of the desert pupfish (C. macularius), but it has since been reclassified as a distinct species.

== Description ==
The Sonoyta pupfish has a thick, chubby body with a superior mouth filled with tricuspid teeth. The scales have spine-like projections. The body colors of males and females vary. Females (and juveniles) have narrow, vertical dark bands on the sides of the body, with a disjoined lateral band. Although females (and juveniles) have silver bodies, the fins are generally colorless, with the exception of an ocellate spot on the dorsal fin, and sometimes, a dark spot on the anal fin. Mature, breeding males, however, have darker fins, attached to a light to sky-blue body. The posterior part of their caudal peduncle (base if the tail) is yellow or orange, and sometimes, an intense orange-red. Compared to other pupfishes, the Quitobaquito pupfish has a larger head, mouth and body, but smaller fins and shorter caudal peduncle. The Quitobaquito pupfish also has a deeper head and longer jaw.

== Range ==
The Sonoyta pupfish currently has a very small range, which is estimated to cover less than 11 km^{2} (4.2 mi^{2}). In the United States, it only survives in the Quitobaquito Springs, a part of the [Sonoyta River] basin in the Organ Pipe Cactus National Monument of south-central Arizona. It also occurs just across the border in Mexico. Elsewhere it is only found in two short stretches of the Sonoyta River in Sonora, Mexico.

== Habitat ==
Sonoyta pupfish are found in springs, lakes, pools, marshes and sluggish streams. The species generally prefers shallow and heavily vegetated waters. These pupfish can handle various fluctuations of water temperatures as well; including salinity levels three times that of seawater and temperatures exceeding 95 °F (35 °C).

== Diet ==
The Sonoyta pupfish is omnivorous and it feeds on plants, the larvae and nymphs of insects, water mites, ostracods, sponge, the eggs of other organisms and also their own eggs.

== Reproduction ==
The male Sonoyta pupfish defends a territory against other males and attempts to attract females. The female's eggs are deposited randomly within the territory. Males have a distinct coloration that intensifies during breeding season.

== Conservation ==
Due to habitat changes, predation and/or competition with nonnative fishes, and possible wind drift of harmful chemicals from Sonora, Mexico, the Sonoyta pupfish population is severely reduced; however, the population at the Quitobaquito Springs remains stable, but sometimes ranges from high to low numbers seasonally. Conservation efforts for this species includes maintenance of habitats by keeping them free of nonnative aquatic species, and observing population health frequently.
