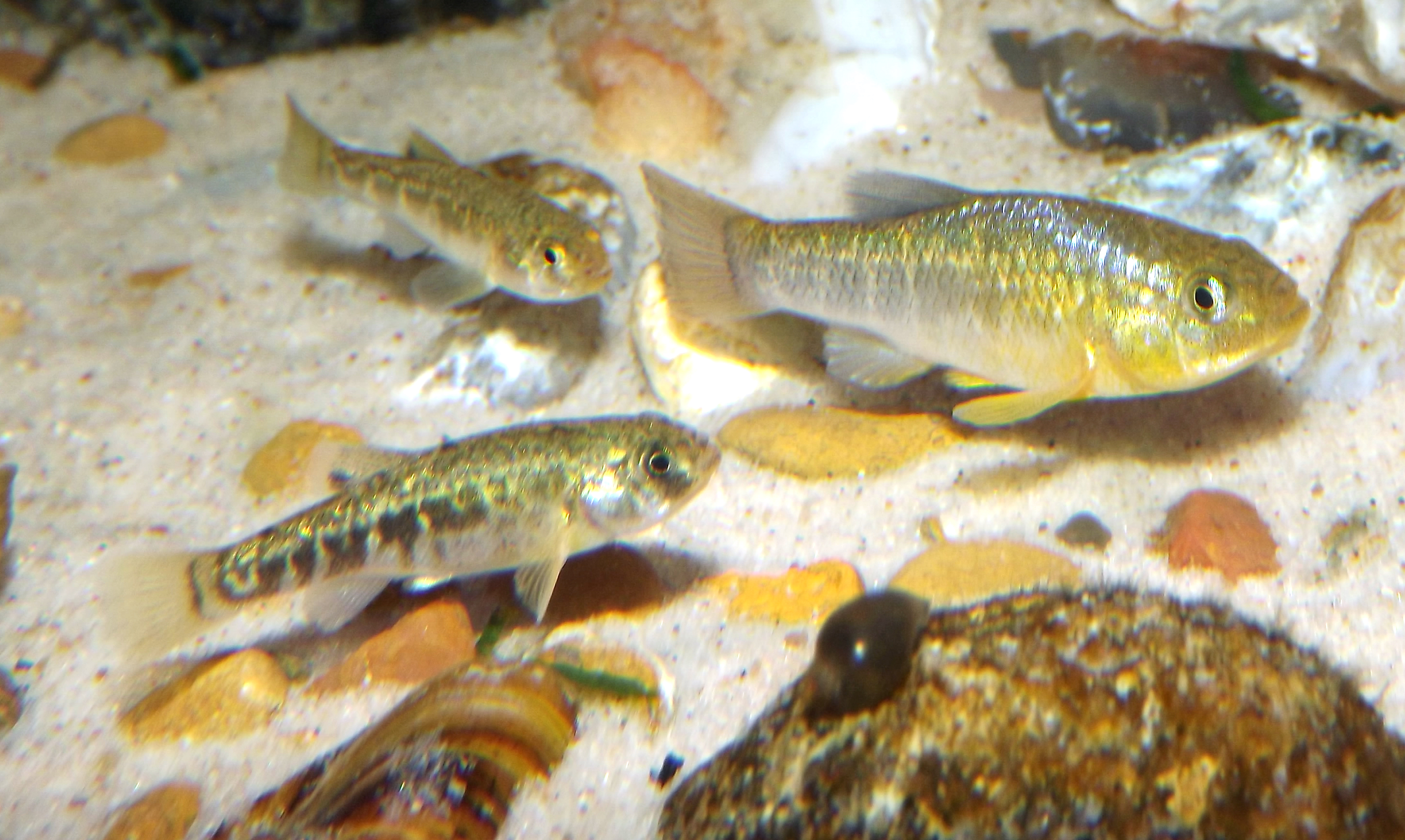

Conservation status
- Least Concern (IUCN 3.1)

Scientific classification
- Kingdom: Animalia
- Phylum: Chordata
- Class: Actinopterygii
- Order: Cyprinodontiformes
- Family: Cyprinodontidae
- Genus: Cyprinodon
- Species: C. rubrofluviatilis

Binomial name
- Cyprinodon rubrofluviatilis Fowler, 1916

Synonyms
- Cyprinodon bovinus rubrofluviatilis Fowler, 1916

= Cyprinodon rubrofluviatilis =

Species of fish

Cyprinodon rubrofluviatilis, known as the Red River pupfish, is a species of pupfish from the United States. It is found only in the Red River of the South and Brazos River drainages of Texas and Oklahoma.

It grows to a total length of 5.8 cm (2.3 in) and feeds on midge larvae and other insects. It was first described by Henry Weed Fowler in 1916, as a subspecies of the species Cyprinodon bovinus; the specific epithet rubrofluviatilis refers to the Red River.
