= Cyprinodon arcuatus =

Conservation status
- Extinct (2011) (IUCN 3.1)

Scientific classification
- Kingdom: Animalia
- Phylum: Chordata
- Class: Actinopterygii
- Order: Cyprinodontiformes
- Family: Cyprinodontidae
- Genus: Cyprinodon
- Species: †C. arcuatus

Binomial name
- †Cyprinodon arcuatus Wendell L. Minckley & R. R. Miller, 2002

Species of fish

Cyprinodon arcuatus (Santa Cruz pupfish) is a species of fish in the family Cyprinodontidae. It was endemic to the Santa Cruz River in Arizona. It was last seen in 1973 and was declared extinct in 2011.

== Description ==
The Santa Cruz pupfish exhibited sexual dimorphism in size, with males averaging 37mm (1.46in) in length and females averaging 32mm (1.26in) in length. Coloration in breeding males was dark green to black with alternating stripes of light and dark. Female and non-breeding males were reported to have clear fins except for a black dorsal fin. C. arcuatus is differentiated from other Cyprinodon species by a highly convex dorsal body and concave post-dorsal body, as well a lack of orange or yellow in breeding males' fins.
