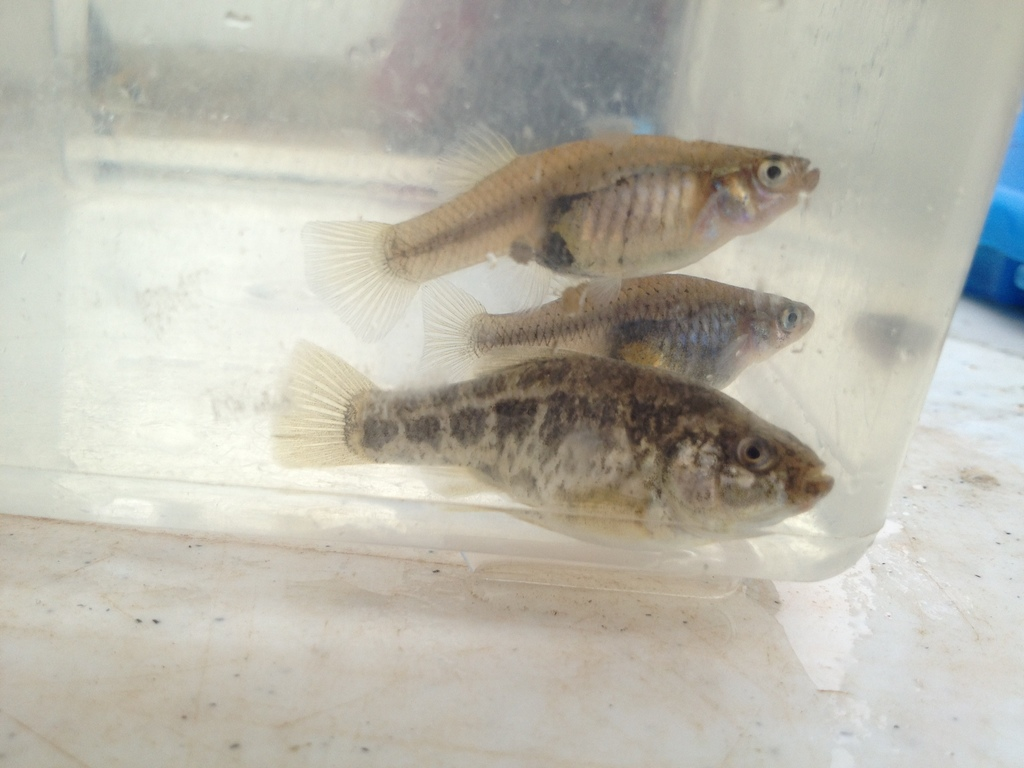

Conservation status
- Vulnerable (IUCN 3.1)

Scientific classification
- Kingdom: Animalia
- Phylum: Chordata
- Class: Actinopterygii
- Order: Cyprinodontiformes
- Family: Cyprinodontidae
- Genus: Cyprinodon
- Species: C. pecosensis

Binomial name
- Cyprinodon pecosensis A. A. Echelle & A. F. Echelle, 1978

= Pecos pupfish =

Species of fish

The Pecos pupfish (Cyprinodon pecosensis) is a species of pupfish in the family Cyprinodontidae. It is endemic to the Pecos River watershed in eastern New Mexico and western Texas in the United States.

== Distribution and habitat ==
Despite once existing throughout the Pecos River, C. pecosensis populations have become increasingly isolated due to significant portions of their native habitat being removed. Following the introduction of Cyprinodon variegatus (sheepshead minnow), pure Pecos pupfish populations have been further isolated and largely exist in scattered sinkholes, man-made impoundments, and marshes. Its natural habitat includes springs, sinkholes, and pools of streams.

== Introduction of Cyprinodon variegatus ==
Cyprinodon variegatus is thought to have been introduced during the early 1980s, presumably via bait-bucket dumping. Shortly after the introduction of C. variegatus, C. variegatus X C. pecosensis hybrids quickly became widespread, occupying an estimated 50% of the native Pecos pupfish range by 1985. The widespread success of hybrids, and quick range expansion throughout native Pecos pupfish waters, has been hypothesized to be the result of selection mechanisms for hybrids during a period when the native C. pecosensis population had experienced a reduction.

Additionally, hybrid populations have been reported to have increased growth-rates and vigor (Heterosis), resulting in Pecos pupfish females to actively choose to mate with hybrids over pure male Pecos pupfish. Given this, conservation efforts have been difficult and efforts are being made to prevent C. variegatus from entering into isolated C. pecosensis populations.
