= Charco Palma pupfish =

Conservation status
- Extinct in the Wild (IUCN 3.1)

Scientific classification
- Kingdom: Animalia
- Phylum: Chordata
- Class: Actinopterygii
- Order: Cyprinodontiformes
- Family: Cyprinodontidae
- Genus: Cyprinodon
- Species: C. veronicae

Binomial name
- Cyprinodon veronicae Lozano-Vilano & Contreras-Balderas, 1993

Species of fish

The Charco Palma pupfish (Cyprinodon veronicae) is a species of small fish in the family Cyprinodontidae. It is endemic to the Ojo de Agua la Presa in southwestern Nuevo Leon state in Mexico. Although listed as critically endangered by the IUCN in 1996, the species is now extinct in the wild (only survives in captivity). The same freshwater spring system was the home of three other pupfish: Cyprinodon ceciliae (extinct), Cyprinodon inmemoriam (extinct) and Cyprinodon longidorsalis (extinct in the wild, survives in captivity). Although these were from the same spring system, each was restricted to its own individual spring and associated waters. The exact spring and associated waters inhabited by the Charco Palma pupfish were also the home of three now-extinct invertebrates: An undescribed species of Cambarellus crayfish, the valvatid freshwater snail Valvata beltrani and an undescribed species of valvatid freshwater snail. The specific name honours the niece of María de Lourdes Lozano-Vilano and daughter of Salvador Contreras-Balderas, Verónica Contreras Arqueita, who assisted on the trip on which the type was collected.
