= Cyprinodon longidorsalis =

Conservation status
- Extinct in the Wild (IUCN 3.1)

Scientific classification
- Kingdom: Animalia
- Phylum: Chordata
- Class: Actinopterygii
- Order: Cyprinodontiformes
- Family: Cyprinodontidae
- Genus: Cyprinodon
- Species: C. longidorsalis

Binomial name
- Cyprinodon longidorsalis Lozano-Vilano & Contreras-Balderas, 1993

Species of fish

Cyprinodon longidorsalis, the cachorrito de charco palmal or La Palma pupfish, is a species of fish in the family Cyprinodontidae. It was endemic to the Ojo de Agua la Presa in southwestern Nuevo Leon state in Mexico, but became extinct in the wild in 1994 due to habitat loss (now survives only in captivity). The same freshwater spring system was the home of three other pupfish: Cyprinodon ceciliae (extinct), Cyprinodon inmemoriam (extinct) and Cyprinodon veronicae (extinct in the wild, survives in captivity). Although these were from the same spring system, each was restricted to its own individual spring pool. The Charco La Palma pool and its spring had a combined area of about 10 m^{2} (110 sq ft) and was no more than 1.4 m (4 ft 7 in) at the deepest point, making the range of the La Palma pupfish perhaps the smallest known for any vertebrate species. This tiny spring pond also was the home of a now-extinct, undescribed species of Cambarellus crayfish.

The La Palma pupfish is a ray-finned fish which can grow up to 5.1 cm (2.0 in) long. Their color ranges from almost gray to a deep blue. It is somewhat distinctive for having a single long dorsal fin which leans back.
