= Cyprinodon ceciliae =

Conservation status
- Extinct (1990) (IUCN 3.1)

Scientific classification
- Kingdom: Animalia
- Phylum: Chordata
- Class: Actinopterygii
- Order: Cyprinodontiformes
- Family: Cyprinodontidae
- Genus: Cyprinodon
- Species: †C. ceciliae

Binomial name
- †Cyprinodon ceciliae Lozano-Vilano & Contreras-Balderas, 1993

Extinct species of fish

Cyprinodon ceciliae (common names include Villa Lopez pupfish and violet pupfish) is an extinct species of pupfish. It was endemic to the Ojo de Agua la Presa in southwestern Nuevo Leon state in Mexico, but disappeared in 1990 due to habitat loss (water extraction and pollution). The same freshwater spring system was the home of three other pupfish: Cyprinodon inmemoriam (extinct), Cyprinodon longidorsalis (extinct in the wild, survives in captivity) and Cyprinodon veronicae (extinct in the wild, survives in captivity). Although these were from the same spring system, each was restricted to its own individual spring and associated waters. The exact spring and associated waters inhabited by the Villa Lopez pupfish were also the home of a now-extinct, undescribed species of Cambarellus crayfish. The specific name honours the daughter of María de Lourdes Lozano-Vilano and niece of Salvador Contreras-Balderas, Cecilia Contreras Lozano, who assisted on the trip on which the type was collected.
