= Mezquital pupfish =

Conservation status
- Endangered (IUCN 3.1)

Scientific classification
- Kingdom: Animalia
- Phylum: Chordata
- Class: Actinopterygii
- Order: Cyprinodontiformes
- Family: Cyprinodontidae
- Genus: Cyprinodon
- Species: C. meeki

Binomial name
- Cyprinodon meeki R. R. Miller, 1976

Species of fish

The Mezquital pupfish (Cyprinodon meeki) is a species of pupfish in the family Cyprinodontidae. It is endemic to Durango in Mexico. This species was described by Robert Rush Miller in 1976 from a pond which was fed by hot springs within the basin of the Río del Tunal, approximately 9 kilometres (5.6 mi) east of Durango City at an altitude of about 1,880 metres (6,170 ft). The specific name honors the American ichthyologist Seth Eugene Meek (1859-1914), a pioneer of the study of the freshwater fish of Mexico.
