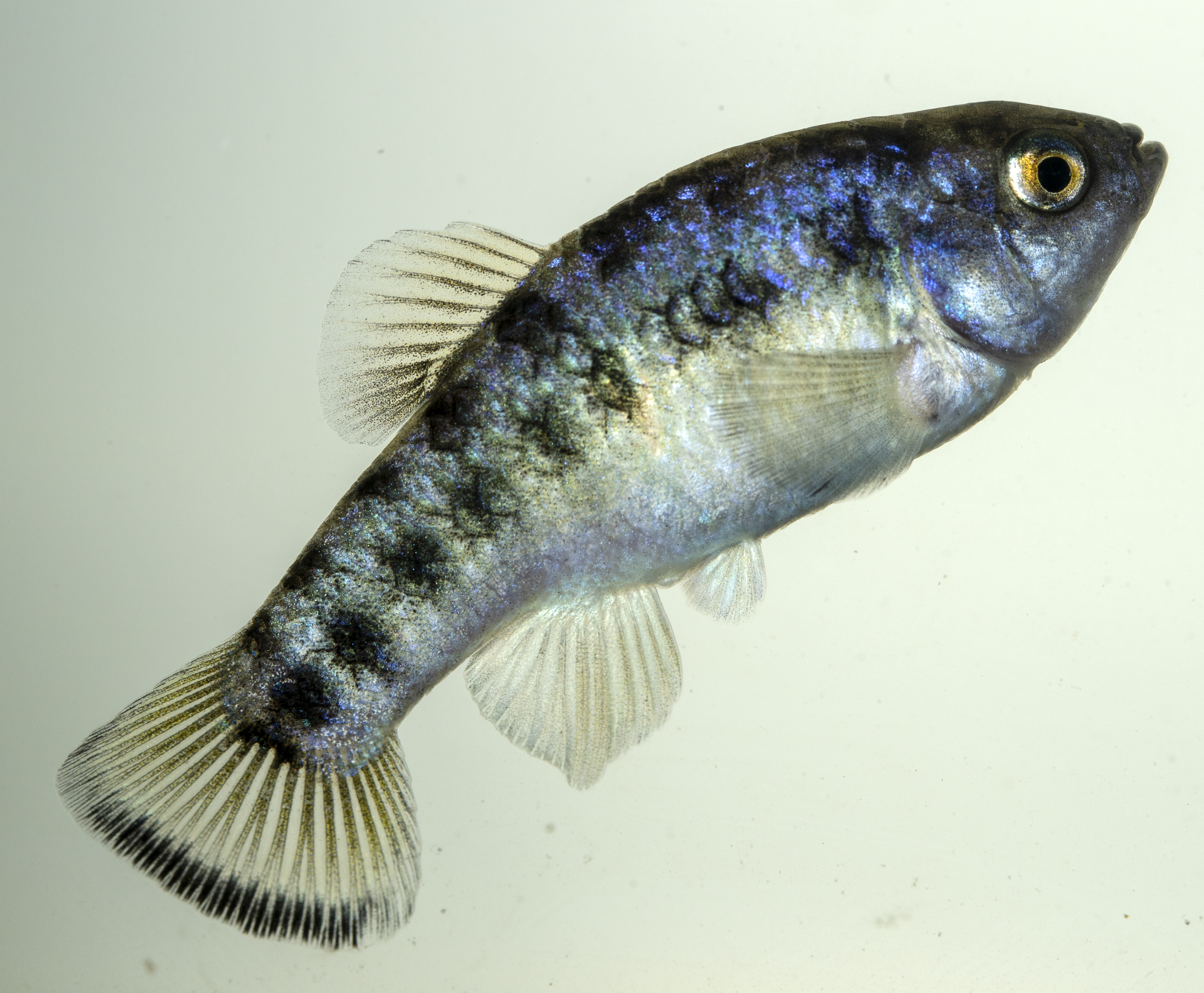

Conservation status
- Near Threatened (IUCN 3.1)

Scientific classification
- Kingdom: Animalia
- Phylum: Chordata
- Class: Actinopterygii
- Order: Cyprinodontiformes
- Family: Cyprinodontidae
- Genus: Cyprinodon
- Species: C. macrolepis

Binomial name
- Cyprinodon macrolepis R. R. Miller, 1976

= Largescale pupfish =

Species of fish

The largescale pupfish (Cyprinodon macrolepis) is a species of fish in the family Cyprinodontidae. This pupfish is endemic to Chihuahua in Mexico, where it is found only in a small spring known as El Ojo de Hacienda Delores and its outlet canal. This spring is located 12.5 kilometres (7.8 miles) southwest of Jimenez, Chihuahua, and lies in the drainage basin of the Rio Florida.
