= Nazas pupfish =

Conservation status
- Least Concern (IUCN 3.1)

Scientific classification
- Kingdom: Animalia
- Phylum: Chordata
- Class: Actinopterygii
- Order: Cyprinodontiformes
- Family: Cyprinodontidae
- Genus: Cyprinodon
- Species: C. nazas

Binomial name
- Cyprinodon nazas R. R. Miller, 1976

Species of fish

The Nazas pupfish (Cyprinodon nazas), known in Spanish as cachorrito del aguanaval, is a species of pupfish in the family Cyprinodontidae. It is endemic to Mexico where found in the states of Coahuila, Durango and Zacatecas.
