= Parras pupfish =

Conservation status
- Critically endangered, possibly extinct (IUCN 3.1)

Scientific classification
- Kingdom: Animalia
- Phylum: Chordata
- Class: Actinopterygii
- Order: Cyprinodontiformes
- Family: Cyprinodontidae
- Genus: Cyprinodon
- Species: C. latifasciatus

Binomial name
- Cyprinodon latifasciatus Garman, 1881

Species of fish

The Parras pupfish (Cyprinodon latifasciatus) is a small species of freshwater pupfish in the family Cyprinodontidae. It is endemic to the Laguna de Mayrán basin in southern Coahuila, Mexico. This species was widely thought to be extinct, 1903 being the date of the last recorded observation and it was declared to be extinct in 1930 until a single specimen was accidentally collected from an irrigation canal, in the town of Parras de la Fuente in 2012.
