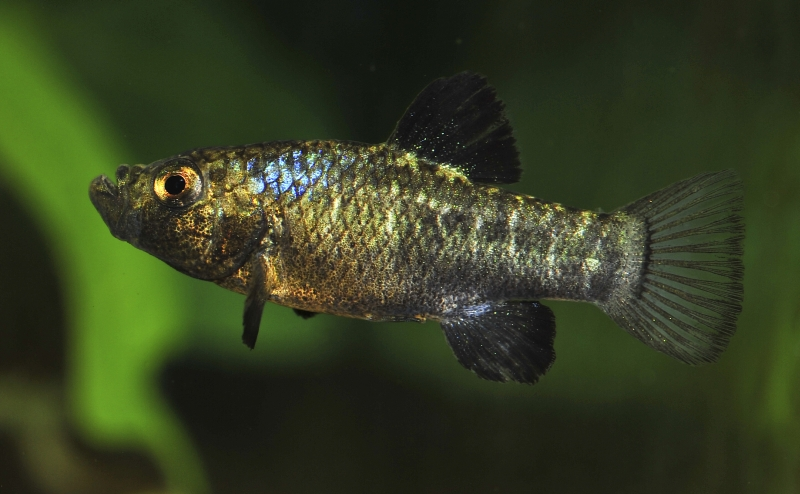

Conservation status
- Least Concern (IUCN 3.1)

Scientific classification
- Kingdom: Animalia
- Phylum: Chordata
- Class: Actinopterygii
- Order: Cyprinodontiformes
- Family: Cyprinodontidae
- Genus: Cyprinodon
- Species: C. desquamator

Binomial name
- Cyprinodon desquamator C. H. Martin & Wainwright, 2013

= Cyprinodon desquamator =

Species of fish

Cyprinodon desquamator is a scale-eating species of pupfish in the genus Cyprinodon. It is endemic to hypersaline interior lakes on San Salvador Island, Bahamas. It coexists alongside two other closely related Cyprinodon species C. brontotheroides and C. variegatus. Together, these three species represent a recent adaptive radiation, each having moved into a difference niche within their specialized environment. Each of these species are defined by distinct trophic adaptations that have affected various aspects of their functional morphology, behavior, strike kinematics, and reproductive coloration.

Cyprinodon desquamator has enlarged adductor muscles, a small in-lever to out-lever ratio for rapidly closing its large lower jaw, and an elongated body for quickly performing scale-removing strikes on Cyprinodon and Gambusia species. This species spawns during the spring and summer, although it appears to be commoner in the summer. The males guard breeding territories.

Specific epithet: 'desquamator' comes from the Latin "one who removes scales from fishes", describing the scale-eating trophic specialization of this species, unique among Cyprinodontiform fishes.

== Coloration ==
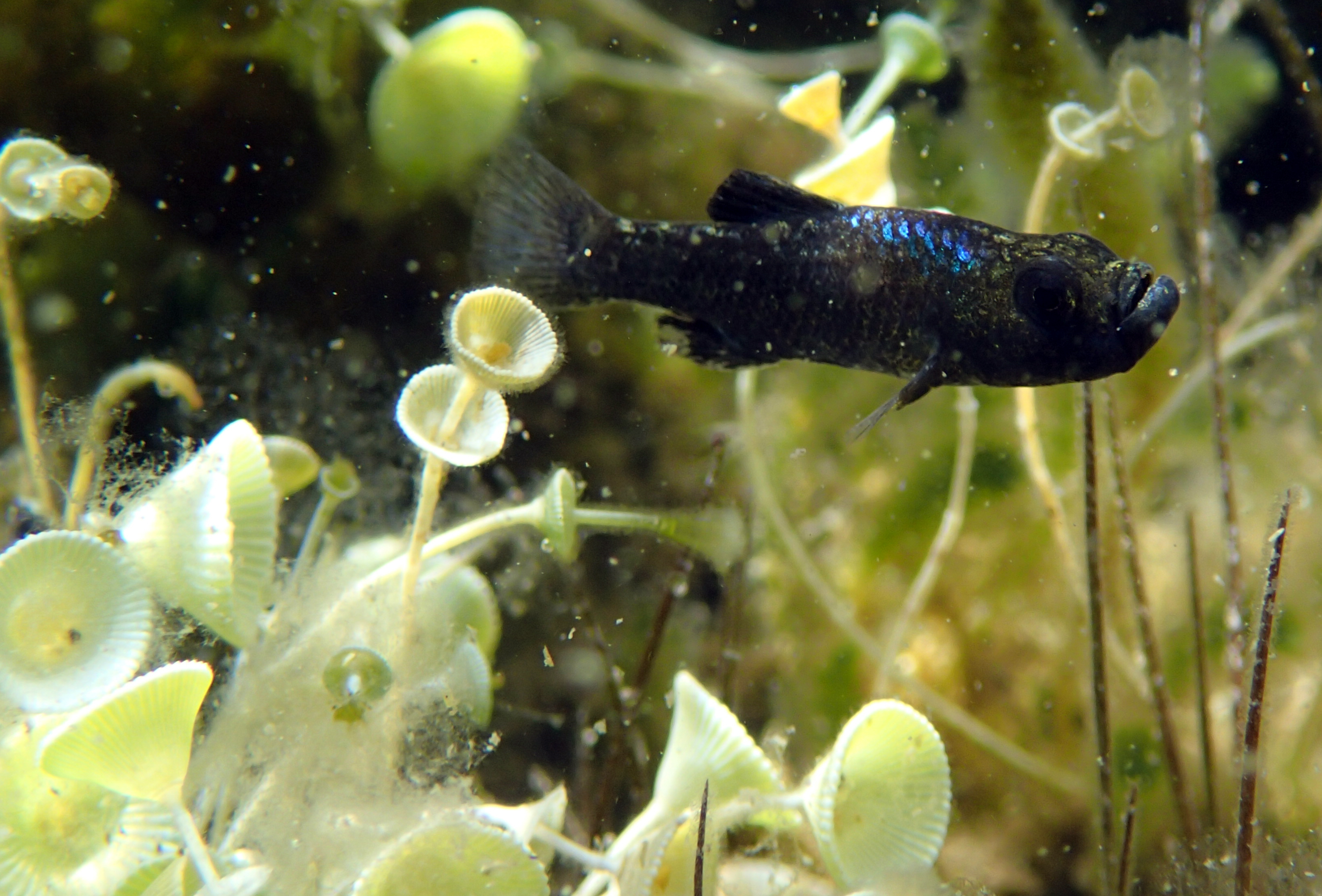
Male

General body color is silvery tan marked by irregular dark, wide bars along the length of the body in both sexes. Characteristic of the genus, mature males display a metallic blue anterodorsal region. This species uniquely lacks the typical black terminal margin to the caudal fin, which is replaced by black pigmentation covering the median fins.

Females and juveniles display the typical black and white ocellus on the dorsal fin. Breeding males display a distinctive coloration of slate gray to jet black pigmentation throughout body and fins, broken only by a speckling of metallic blue in the anterodorsal region. Unlike most congeners, breeding males do not display any orange ventral coloration that is replaced by gray or black pigmentation.
