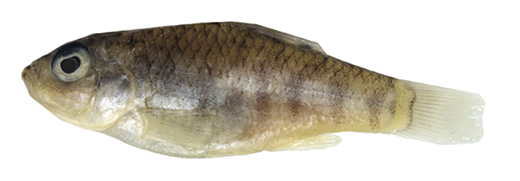

Conservation status
- Endangered (IUCN 3.1)

Scientific classification
- Kingdom: Animalia
- Phylum: Chordata
- Class: Actinopterygii
- Order: Cyprinodontiformes
- Family: Cyprinodontidae
- Genus: Cyprinodon
- Species: C. bondi

Binomial name
- Cyprinodon bondi Myers, 1935

= Hispaniola pupfish =

Species of fish

The Hispaniola pupfish (Cyprinodon bondi) is a fish endemic to the lakes of Etang Saumâtre and Lake Enriquillo on the island of Hispaniola, in both Haiti and the Dominican Republic.

== Taxonomic history ==
George S. Myers wrote its species description in 1935. Its holotype was deposited at the National Museum of Natural History. The type locality of the fish is Étang Saumâtre, Haiti. Myers named this species after R. M. Bond, who collected the specimens Myers used for his description.

== Description ==
The adults' total length is up to 82 mm (3.2 in); this is large for the genus Cyprinodon. Its standard length is up to 62 mm (2.4 in).

== Distribution ==
The fish's holotype and paratypes were all collected in Étang Saumâtre, Haiti. Michael Leonard Smith writes this species is endemic to this lake, on the border of Haiti and the Dominican Republic; some specimens collected from Lago Enriquillo had been identified as being C. bondi, but Smith argues that this identification was mistaken.
