= Cachorrito de la Trinidad =

Cachorrito de la trinidad

Conservation status
- Extinct (1985) (IUCN 3.1)

Scientific classification
- Kingdom: Animalia
- Phylum: Chordata
- Class: Actinopterygii
- Order: Cyprinodontiformes
- Family: Cyprinodontidae
- Genus: Cyprinodon
- Species: †C. inmemoriam

Binomial name
- †Cyprinodon inmemoriam Lozano-Vilano & Contreras-Balderas, 1993

Species of fish

The Cachorrito de la Trinidad, also known in English as the Charco Azul pupfish (Cyprinodon inmemoriam), was a small species of fish in the family Cyprinodontidae. It was endemic to Ojo de Agua la Presa in southwestern Nuevo Leon state in Mexico, but became extinct in 1985 due to habitat loss (water extraction and pollution). The same freshwater spring system was the home of three other pupfish: Cyprinodon ceciliae (extinct), Cyprinodon longidorsalis (extinct in the wild, survives in captivity) and Cyprinodon veronicae (extinct in the wild, survives in captivity). Although these were from the same spring system, each was restricted to its own individual spring pool. The spring pond inhabited by the Charco Azul pupfish was also the home of a now-extinct, undescribed species of Cambarellus crayfish. The specific name inmemoriam means "in memory" and signifies the extinction of the species due to its native spring being dried out by groundwater extraction soon after the discovery of this fish in 1983.
