= Titus Canyon Formation =

Geologic formation in Inyo County, California

- Stratigraphic range: Late Eocene (Priabonian), 38–34 Ma
- Type: Geologic formation

Location
- Region: California
- Country: United States

Type section
- Named for: Titus Canyon

The Titus Canyon Formation is an Late Eocene-aged geologic formation in Inyo County, California. It was deposited in an inland freshwater environment, and preserves fossil fish and mammal specimens.

H. Donald Curry collected the type specimens of the three teleosts Fundulus curryi, Fundulus euepis, and Cyprinodon breviradius in the Titus Canyon Formation. Both of these genera are present in the Titus Canyon Formation sediments of Death Valley National Park.
