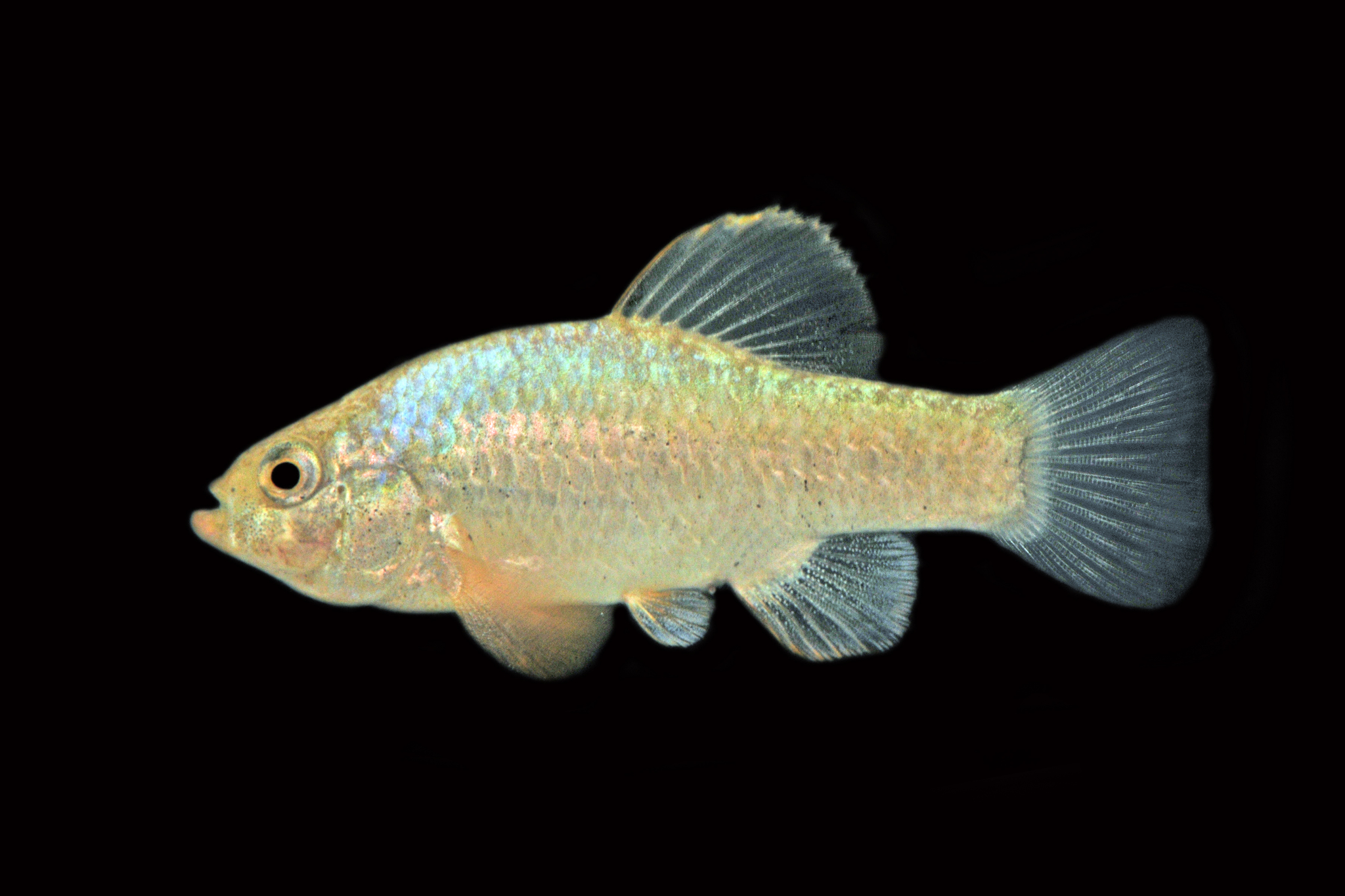

Conservation status
- Endangered (IUCN 3.1)

- Critically Imperiled (NatureServe)

Scientific classification
- Kingdom: Animalia
- Phylum: Chordata
- Class: Actinopterygii
- Division: Teleostei
- Order: Cyprinodontiformes
- Family: Cyprinodontidae
- Genus: Cyprinodon
- Species: C. tularosa

Binomial name
- Cyprinodon tularosa R. R. Miller & A. A. Echelle, 1975

= White Sands pupfish =

Species of fish

The White Sands pupfish (Cyprinodon tularosa) is an endangered species of pupfish from the family Cyprinodontidae. The native range of the White Sands pupfish included the Pleistocene Lake Otero and its surrounding tributaries. Currently, the extant populations of White Sands pupfish reside on the Tularosa Basin in White Sands, New Mexico, United States. Four populations of White Sands pupfish exist: native populations found in Salt Creek and Malpais Spring, and two introduced populations in Mound Spring and Lost River.

== Description ==
The White Sands pupfish ranges from 4.4 to 6.4 cm (1.75 to 2.5 in) in length. The males have gray scales and a white underside; they are differentiated from females by a blue sheen and a band on their tails. Females have a dark spot on their ventral fin and vertical striping on their sides. During mating season, the White Sands pupfish undergo a colorful transformation. Males turn a bright metallic blue with yellow-orange fins. Females turn green to yellow with butter-colored fins.

== Habitat ==
White Sands pupfish are found in the Tularosa Basin, New Mexico, where they occur in two springs and two streams. Their native habitats include Salt Creek and Malpais Spring, and new populations have been established in Mound Springs and Lost Creek. Vegetation such as salt grass, salt alder, pondweed, bulrush and pickleweed lining the sides of creeks provide negative cover for the pupfish. The population living in Salt Creek spends the winter months living in the lower portion of the creek; once summer arrives, this section of the creek begins to dry up, and the pupfish return to the springs feeding the creek. It has been noted that the salinity of Salt Creek is higher than the salinity of the ocean. There have been recorded genetic differences between populations of White Sands pupfish that live in Malpais Springs and Salt Creek. High F_{ST} values were reported for the populations of pupfish in Malpais springs and Salt Creek. There was also a high-F_{ST} subpopulation of pupfish living in Salt Creek that is fragmented by a head-cut waterfall.

== Biology ==
The lifespan of a White Sands pupfish is two years. These fish reach maturity at around 4.4–6.4 cm (1.75–2.5 in) in length. Mating season lasts from beginning of April and continues through early fall in October. Males are often territorial during mating and will mate with a multitude of females. The White Sands pupfish will lay clutches of 12–15 eggs in size. They have become highly adaptive, living in water conditions that range from fresh to saltier than the ocean.

== Conservation efforts ==
Only two native populations of White Sands pupfish were known before 1967: Malpais Springs and Salt Creek. In 1967, a population of pupfish was introduced to Mound Springs, and in 1970, a group of 30 White Sands pupfish from the Salt Creek population was introduced into Lost River through conservation efforts. Populations of White Sands pupfish are still threatened by introduction of exotic species such as Virile Crayfish and Western mosquitofish. White Sands pupfish are also vulnerable to parasites such as trematodes.

== See also ==
- Index of Cyprinodon species (pupfish) – North American pupfish genus
- Pupfish
