= Thicklip pupfish =

Conservation status
- Vulnerable (IUCN 3.1)

Scientific classification
- Kingdom: Animalia
- Phylum: Chordata
- Class: Actinopterygii
- Order: Cyprinodontiformes
- Family: Cyprinodontidae
- Genus: Cyprinodon
- Species: C. labiosus

Binomial name
- Cyprinodon labiosus Humphries & R. R. Miller, 1981

Species of fish

The thicklip pupfish (Cyprinodon labiosus), known in Spanish as Cachorrito cangrejero, is a species of fish in the family Cyprinodontidae. The thicklip pupfish is endemic to Laguna Chichancanab in Quintana Roo, Mexico. In almost all places, different Cyprinodon species do not overlap in their range, but there are two notable exceptions and one of these is Lake Chichancanab, which is inhabited by C. labiosus, C. beltrani, C. esconditus, C. maya, C. simus, C. suavium and C. verecundus (the other place where several Cyprinodon species live together are lakes in San Salvador Island, the Bahamas). Among the endemic Cyprinodon species in Lake Chichancanab, only C. beltrani and C. labiosus still occur in some numbers in their habitat, while the remaining are virtually—if not fully—extinct in the wild (at least some of these still survive in captivity). They usually live in a tropical climate with temperatures ranging from 22 to 26 °C (72 to 79 °F). The maximum total length of this fish is 7 centimetres (2.8 in).
