= Blackfin pupfish =

Conservation status
- Vulnerable (IUCN 3.1)

Scientific classification
- Kingdom: Animalia
- Phylum: Chordata
- Class: Actinopterygii
- Order: Cyprinodontiformes
- Family: Cyprinodontidae
- Genus: Cyprinodon
- Species: C. beltrani

Binomial name
- Cyprinodon beltrani Álvarez, 1949

Species of fish

The Blackfin pupfish (Cyprinodon beltrani) is a species of fish in the family Cyprinodontidae. This pupfish is endemic to Lake Chichancanab in Quintana Roo, Mexico. In almost all places, different Cyprinodon species do not overlap in their range, but there are two notable exceptions and one of these is Lake Chichancanab, which is inhabited by C. beltrani, C. esconditus, C. labiosus, C. maya, C. simus, C. suavium and C. verecundus (the other place where several Cyprinodon species live together are lakes in San Salvador Island, the Bahamas). Among the endemic Cyprinodon species in Lake Chichancanab, only C. beltrani and C. labiosus still occur in some numbers in their habitat, while the remaining are virtually—if not fully—extinct in the wild (at least some of these still survive in captivity). This species feeds on detritus. Compared to the other species of pupfish mentioned previously, the C. beltrani prefer a different feeding substrate (which is sand). In regards to mating, the female blackfin pupfish seems to mate with other species of pupfish and not just the C. beltrani. The male blackfin pupfish have similar markings and courting behaviors to other pupfish in their habitat. The person honored in the specific name of this pupfish is the Mexican biologist Enrique Beltrán Castillo (1903–1994) to mark his quarter century of being a biologist.
