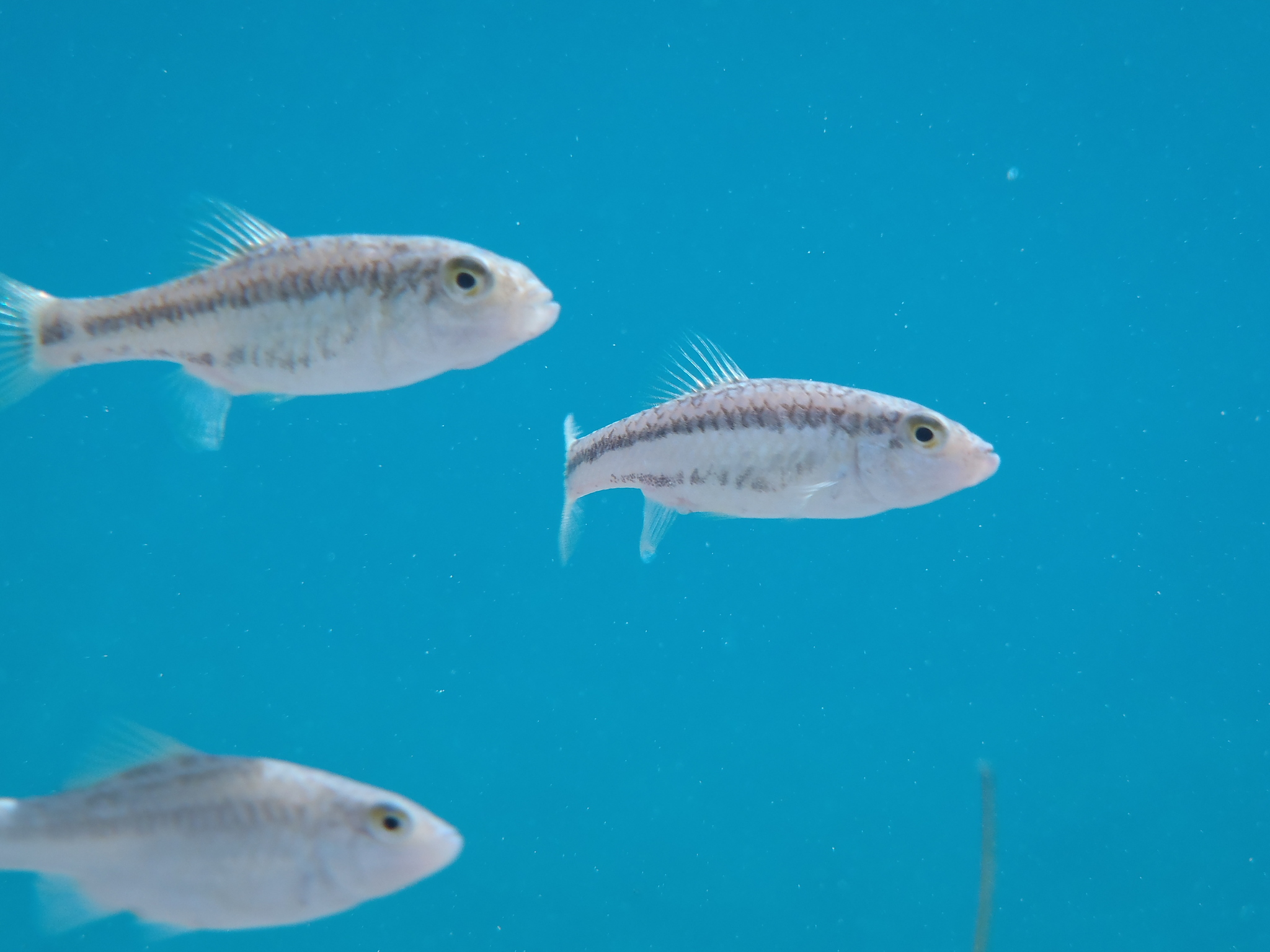
- Cyprinodon bifasciatus in Cuatro Ciénegas, Mexico

Conservation status
- Endangered (IUCN 3.1)

Scientific classification
- Kingdom: Animalia
- Phylum: Chordata
- Class: Actinopterygii
- Order: Cyprinodontiformes
- Family: Cyprinodontidae
- Genus: Cyprinodon
- Species: C. bifasciatus

Binomial name
- Cyprinodon bifasciatus R. R. Miller, 1968

= Cuatro Cienegas pupfish =

Species of fish

Cuatro Cienegas pupfish (Cyprinodon bifasciatus) is a species of fish in the Cyprinodon genus of the family Cyprinodontidae.

It is endemic to the Cuatro Cienegas springs in Coahuila state, northeastern Mexico.

== See also ==
- Pupfish
- Cyprinodon (pupfish) species topics
