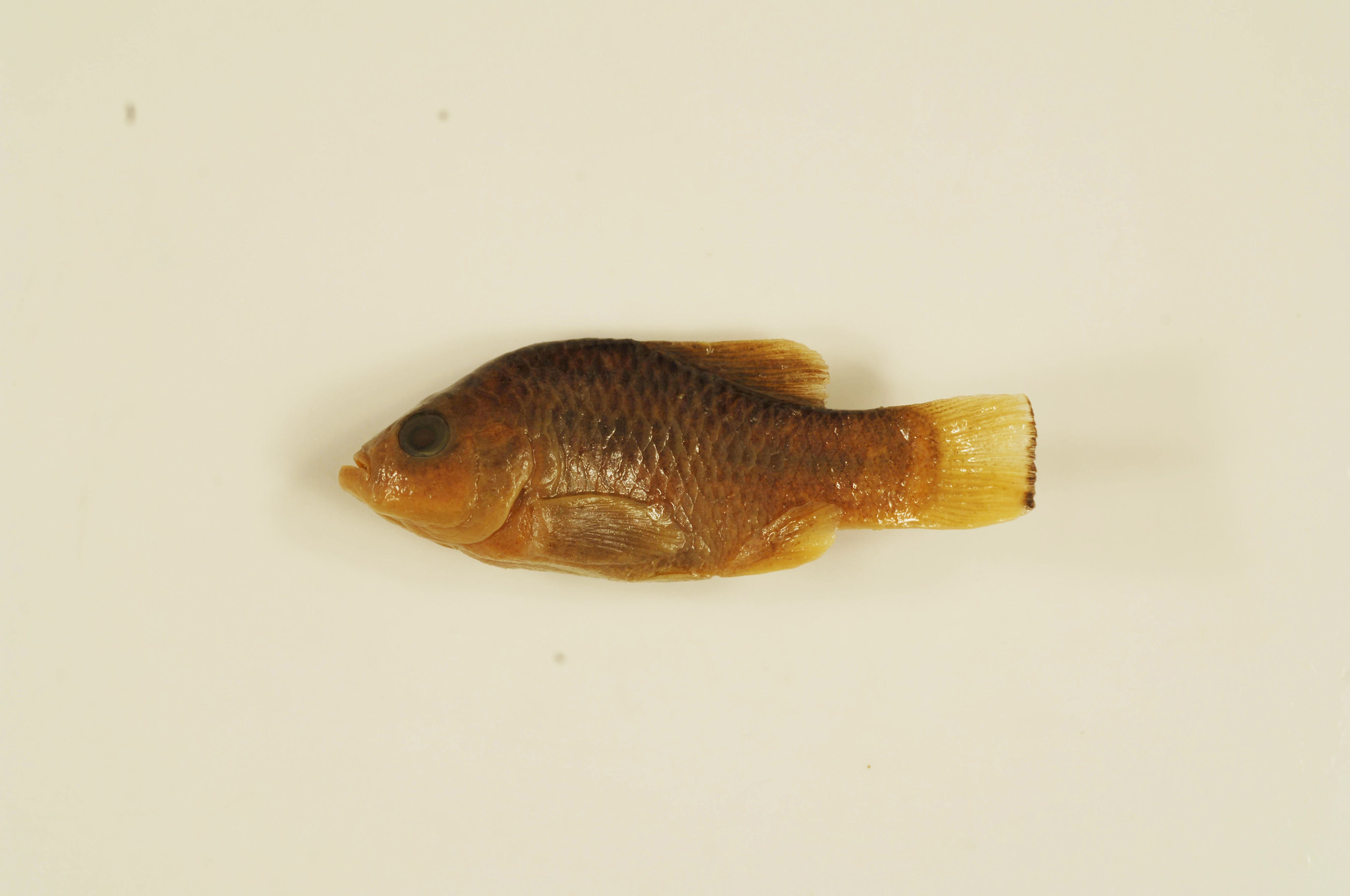

Conservation status
- Vulnerable (IUCN 3.1)

- Endangered (ESA)

Scientific classification
- Kingdom: Animalia
- Phylum: Chordata
- Class: Actinopterygii
- Order: Cyprinodontiformes
- Family: Cyprinodontidae
- Genus: Cyprinodon
- Species: C. bovinus

Binomial name
- Cyprinodon bovinus S. F. Baird & Girard, 1853

= Leon Springs pupfish =

Species of fish

The Leon Springs pupfish (Cyprinodon bovinus) is a species of fish in the family Cyprinodontidae. It is endemic to Pecos County, Texas in the United States. It is a federally listed endangered species.

The Leon Springs pupfish is found at the shallow edges of spring-fed wetland pools, where it is most frequently observed in areas without vegetation. Its diet consists of diatoms, amphipods, and ostracods.

This fish was first discovered in 1851 at Leon Springs, near Fort Stockton, Texas. Leon Springs was impounded, poisoned, stocked with game fish, and drained, and the fish was considered extinct by 1938. In the 1960s it was rediscovered at Diamond Y Spring a few miles away. It is also found in the Diamond Y Draw, a tributary of the Pecos River.
