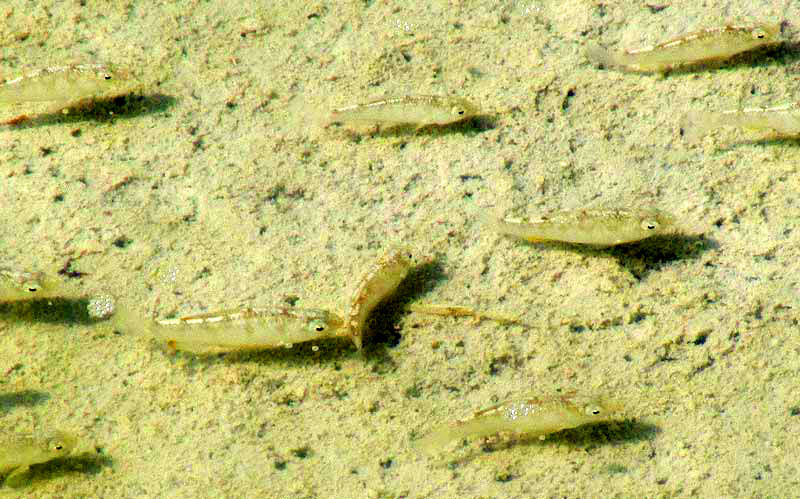

Scientific classification
- Kingdom: Animalia
- Phylum: Chordata
- Class: Actinopterygii
- Order: Cyprinodontiformes
- Family: Cyprinodontidae
- Genus: Cyprinodon
- Species: C. artifrons

Binomial name
- Cyprinodon artifrons Hubbs, 1936

= Cyprinodon artifrons =

Species of fish

Cyprinodon artifrons is a species of ray-finned fish.

== Description ==
These carp-like fish are somewhat flattened, olive colored, the females a lighter shade than the males. Males display ~6 poorly defined dark bars on their sides, while the females' bars are more irregular. Males are whitish below, the females pale. Dorsal fins on breeding males are metallic blue on the back, female dorsals are clear except for a dark spot at the rear.

== Range ==
Mexico's coastal northern Yucatan Peninsula and Belize.

== Habitat ==
They live in tropical seawater, freshwater and brackish water, keeping close to the water's bottom.

== Ecology ==
They stay in shallow water, particularly where the bottom is vegetated. The fish pictured in the taxonomy box were in extremely salty water along a levee running among salt evaporation ponds at Las Coloradas, Yucatán.

== Etymology ==
Cyprinodon: Latin, cyprinus = carp + Greek, odous = teeth

== Taxonomy ==
The name Cyprinodon artifrons is a synonym of Cyprinodon variegatus artifrons.
