= Bolson pupfish =

Conservation status
- Endangered (IUCN 3.1)

Scientific classification
- Kingdom: Animalia
- Phylum: Chordata
- Class: Actinopterygii
- Order: Cyprinodontiformes
- Family: Cyprinodontidae
- Genus: Cyprinodon
- Species: C. atrorus

Binomial name
- Cyprinodon atrorus R. R. Miller, 1968

Species of fish

Bolson pupfish (Cyprinodon atrorus) is a species of freshwater fish in the family Cyprinodontidae.

It is endemic to northeastern Mexico, in the Río Salado and Cuatro Ciénegas river systems.

== See also ==
- Pupfish
