= Lee A. Fuiman =

American marine biologist

Lee Alan Fuiman is an American marine biologist, currently the Perry Richardson Bass Chair in Fisheries at University of Texas at Austin

== Education ==
- Ph.D., University of Michigan (1983)
- M.S., Cornell University (1978)
- B.S., Southampton College of Long Island University (1974)

== See also ==
- Category:Taxa named by Lee A. Fuiman
