= Robert Rush Miller =

American ichthyologist

- Born: April 23, 1916; Colorado Springs, Colorado, United States
- Died: February 10, 2003 (aged 86)
- Education: University of Michigan
- Relatives: Frances Hubbs Miller (wife); Carl Leavitt Hubbs (father-in-law); Laura Hubbs (mother-in-law); Carl Hubbs (brother-in-law); Frances Naomi Clark (aunt-in-law)

Robert Rush Miller (April 23, 1916 – February 10, 2003) was an important figure in American ichthyology and conservation from 1940 to the 1990s.

He was born in Colorado Springs, earned his bachelor's degree at University of California, Berkeley in 1938, a master's degree at the University of Michigan in 1943, and a Ph.D. at the University of Michigan in 1944. He received tenure at the University of Michigan in 1954.

Together with W. L. Minckley, he discovered a new species of platyfish, Xiphophorus gordoni, that they named in honor of Dr Myron Gordon. He served as the ichthyological editor of Copeia from 1950 to 1955.

== Fish discovered ==
- Chortiheros wesseli R. R. Miller 1996 - Cichlid
- Cualac tessellatus R. R. Miller 1956 - (Checkered Pupfish)
- Cyprinodon albivelis W. L. Minckley & R. R. Miller, 2002 (Whitefin pupfish)
- Cyprinodon alvarezi R. R. Miller, 1976 (Potosi pupfish)
- †Cyprinodon arcuatus W. L. Minckley & R. R. Miller, 2002 (Santa Cruz pupfish)
- Cyprinodon atrorus R. R. Miller, 1968 (Bolson pupfish)
- Cyprinodon bifasciatus R. R. Miller, 1968 (Cuatro Cienegas pupfish)
- Cyprinodon eremus R. R. Miller & Fuiman, 1987 (Sonoyta pupfish)
- Cyprinodon fontinalis M. L. Smith & R. R. Miller, 1980 (Carbonera pupfish)
- Cyprinodon labiosus Humphries & R. R. Miller, 1981 (Thicklip pupfish)
- Cyprinodon laciniatus C. L. Hubbs & R. R. Miller, 1942 (Bahama pupfish)
- Cyprinodon macrolepis R. R. Miller, 1976 (Largescale pupfish)
- Cyprinodon maya Humphries & R. R. Miller, 1981 (Maya pupfish)
- Cyprinodon meeki R. R. Miller, 1976 (Mezquital pupfish)
- Cyprinodon nazas R. R. Miller, 1976 (Nazas pupfish)
- Cyprinodon nevadensis amargosae R. R. Miller, 1948 (Amargosa River pupfish)
- †Cyprinodon nevadensis calidae R. R. Miller, 1948 (Tecopa pupfish)
- Cyprinodon nevadensis mionectes R. R. Miller, 1948 (Ash Meadows pupfish)
- Cyprinodon nevadensis pectoralis R. R. Miller, 1948 (Warm Springs pupfish)
- Cyprinodon nevadensis shoshone R. R. Miller, 1948 (Shoshone pupfish)
- Cyprinodon pisteri R. R. Miller & W. L. Minckley, 2002 (Palomas pupfish)
- Cyprinodon radiosus R. R. Miller, 1948 (Owens pupfish)
- Cyprinodon salinus R. R. Miller, 1943
- Cyprinodon salinus salinus R. R. Miller, 1943 (Death Valley pupfish, Salt Creek pupfish)
- Cyprinodon simus Humphries & R. R. Miller, 1981 (Boxer pupfish)
- Cyprinodon tularosa R. R. Miller & A. A. Echelle, 1975 (White Sands pupfish)
- Xiphophorus gordoni Miller and W. L. Minckley 1963

== Taxon described by him ==
- See Category:Taxa named by Robert Rush Miller

== Selected publications ==
- Miller, Robert R. and Minckley, W. L. (1963) "Xiphophorus gordoni, A New Species of Platyfish from Coahuila, Mexico" Copeia 1963(3): pp. 538–546
- Lagler, Karl Frank; Bardach, John E. and Miller, Robert Rush (1962) Ichthyology University of Michigan, Ann Arbor, Michigan, OCLC 61070182 (textbook)
- Miller, Robert Rush, Wendell L. Minckley, and Steven Mark Norris. Freshwater fishes of Mexico. University of Chicago Press, 2005.
- Hubbs, C. L., and R. R. Miller. 1948. The Great Basin with emphasis on glacial and postglacial times. II. The zoological evidence. Univ. Utah Bull. 38:17-166
- Miller, Robert Rush. Man and the changing fish fauna of the American Southwest. Michigan Academy of Science, Arts, and Letters, 1961.
- Miller, R.R. 1972. Threatened Freshwater Fishes of the United States. Transactions of the American Fisheries Society 101, 239–252.
