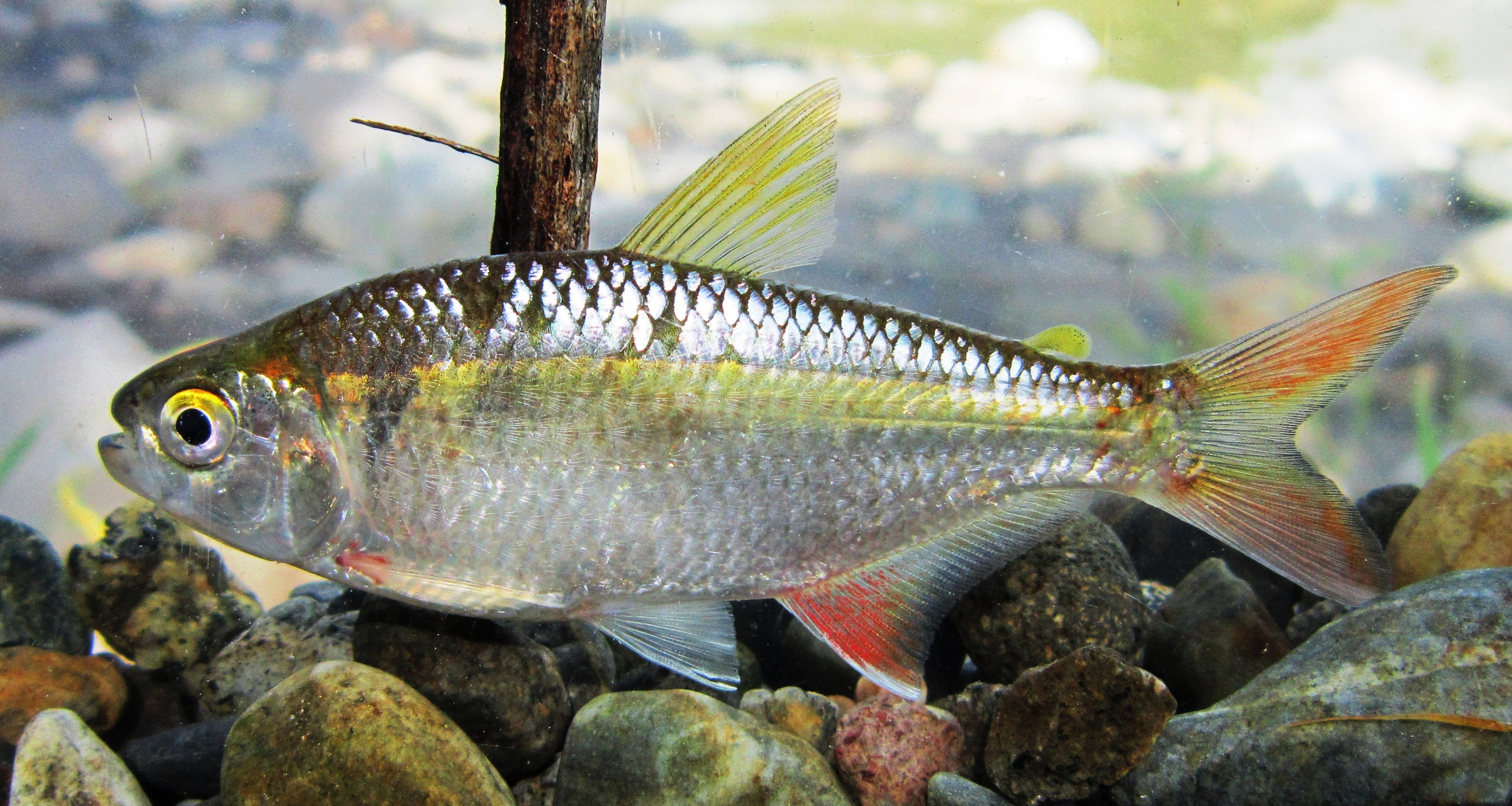

Conservation status
- Least Concern (IUCN 3.1)

Scientific classification
- Kingdom: Animalia
- Phylum: Chordata
- Class: Actinopterygii
- Order: Characiformes
- Family: Acestrorhamphidae
- Genus: Psalidodon
- Species: P. fasciatus

Binomial name
- Psalidodon fasciatus (Cuvier, 1819)

Synonyms
- Chalceus fasciatus Cuvier, 1819; Astyanax fasciatus (Cuvier, 1819); Tetragonopterus viejita Valenciennes, 1850; Astyanax carolinae Gill, 1870; Tetragonopterus cuvieri Lütken, 1875; Astyanax heterurus C. H. Eigenmann & C. E. Wilson, 1914; Astyanax hanstroemi Dahl, 1943; Astyanax fasciatus orteguasae Fowler, 1943

= Psalidodon fasciatus =

Species of fish

Psalidodon fasciatus, commonly known as the banded astyanax, is a species of freshwater ray-finned fish belonging to the family Acestrorhamphidae, the American characins. This fish is widespread in the Americas from Mexico to Argentina. It grows up to 17.1 cm (6.7 in) in length. Formerly thought to be closely related to the Mexican tetra, it is now in the same genus as the Buenos Aires tetra.

It is the target species of the scale-eating Deuterodon heterostomus which is a close mimic.

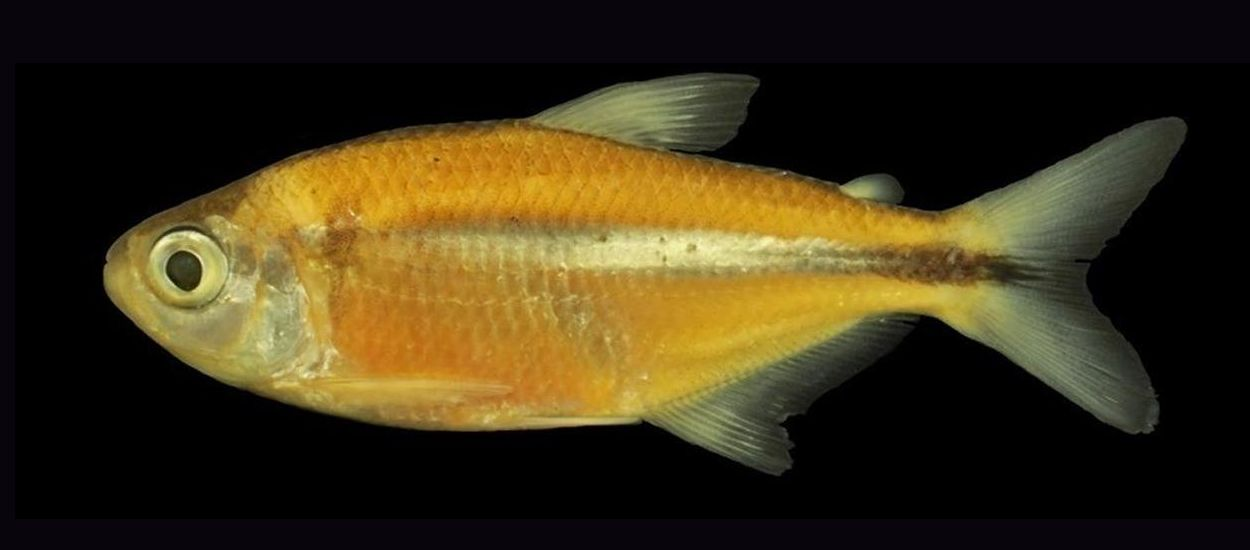
Preserved specimen
