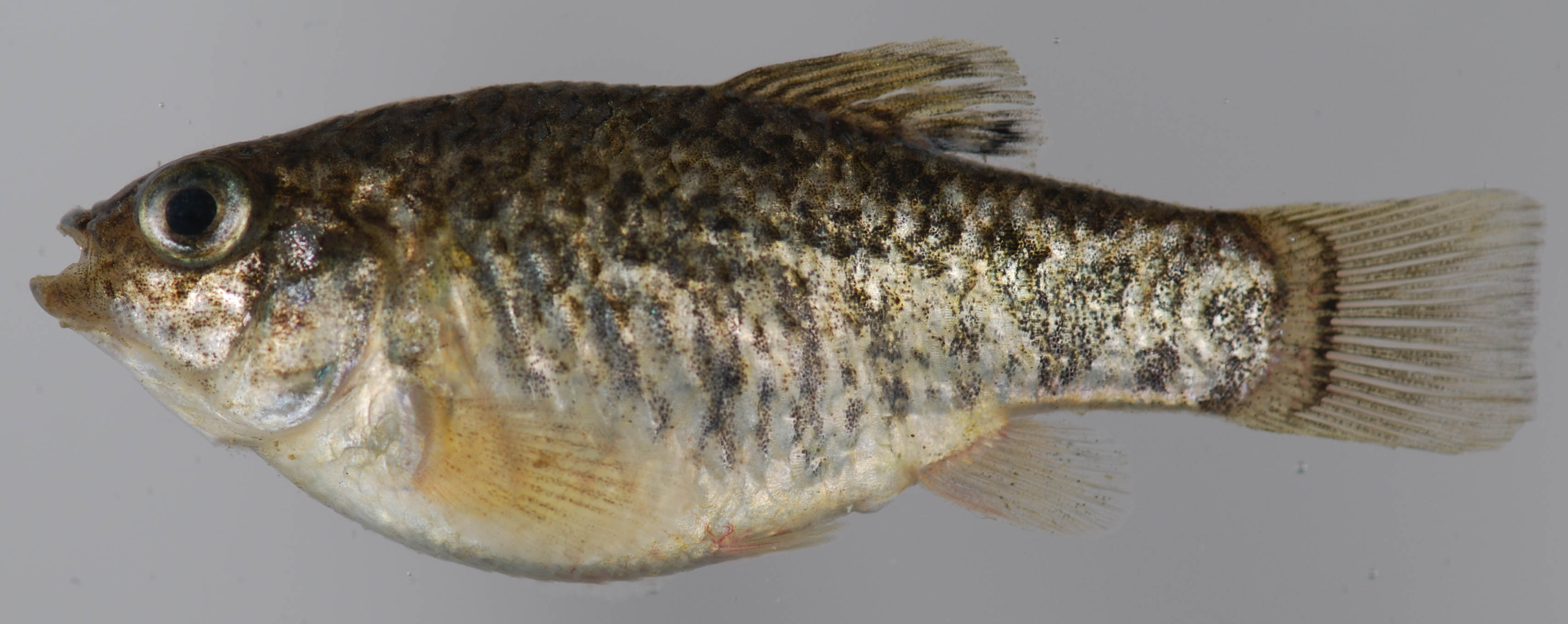

Conservation status
- Least Concern (IUCN 3.1)

Scientific classification
- Kingdom: Animalia
- Phylum: Chordata
- Class: Actinopterygii
- Division: Teleostei
- Order: Cyprinodontiformes
- Family: Cyprinodontidae
- Genus: Cyprinodon
- Species: C. variegatus

Binomial name
- Cyprinodon variegatus Lacépède, 1803

Subspecies
- Cyprinodon variegatus baconi Breder, 1932; Cyprinodon variegatus ovinus (Mitchill, 1815); Cyprinodon variegatus variegatus (Lacépède, 1803)

Synonyms
- Cyprinodon ellipsoidea (Lesueur, 1821); Cyprinodon gibbosus Baird & Girard, 1853; Cyprinodon rhomboidalis (Valenciennes, 1821); Cyprinodon variegatus Lacépède, 1803; Cyprinus variegatus Bosc, 1803; Lebia ellipsoidea Lesueur, 1821; Lebias rhomboidalis Valenciennes, 1821; Cyprinodon baconi Breder, 1932

= Sheepshead minnow =

Species of fish

The sheepshead minnow (Cyprinodon variegatus), also known as sheepshead pupfish, is a species of ray-finned fish in the family Cyprinodontidae, the pupfishes. It is found in salt marsh and estuary environments and is native to the eastern coasts of North and Central America.

== Description ==
The sheepshead minnow is a deep-bodied fish; its body, exclusive of its tail, is nearly half as deep as it is long. The length of the fish averages 30 mm (1.2 in); it ranges to a maximum of 75 mm (3 in). It is laterally compressed with flat sides, an arched back and a small head with a flattened top. The small mouth is at the end of the snout and the teeth are large and wedge-shaped with three cusps. The pectoral fins are large and extend past the origins of the small pelvic fins. The origin of the anal fin hardly overlaps the trailing edge of the dorsal fin. The caudal peduncle is thick and the caudal fin is truncated and square-ended. The arrangement of the fins, the deep body and the tri-cuspid teeth help to distinguish this fish from the mummichog (Fundulus heteroclitus), which is found in the same habitats. The body is covered by large, circular scales, the ones on the cheeks and the top of the head and a single scale just above the pectoral fin being the largest. The male is generally larger and more deep-bodied than the female, with larger dorsal, pelvic and anal fins.

The color of the sheepshead minnow is olive green above and yellowish below. Juveniles have irregular transverse dark bars and the females keep these as they mature, while the males lose theirs. The dorsal fin is dark while the pectoral, pelvic and anal fins are orange. During the breeding season the male becomes very colorful with steel blue upper parts in front of the dorsal fin, lustrous green upper parts behind and deep salmon-pink underparts.

== Distribution and habitat ==
The sheepshead minnow is native to the eastern coast of the United States. Its range extends from Cape Cod southwards to the Yucatan peninsula in Mexico, also the West Indies. It is found in brackish water in bays, inlets, lagoons, saltmarshes and similar locations with little wave action and sandy or muddy bottoms. It is tolerant of wide variations in salinity and is also found in hypersaline conditions.

== Behavior ==
The sheepshead minnow is an omnivore, eating both animal and vegetable matter. Its diet mainly consists of detritus, microalgae, crustacean larvae and other small invertebrates. Males are aggressive and will attack fish larger than itself, slashing its prey with its sharp teeth and devouring it when it is subdued. Breeding takes place in shallow water between April and September, the males competing fiercely for the females. A few eggs are spawned at a time, and these are fertilised by the males which grasp the females with their fins. The eggs clump together and sink to the seabed, connected by sticky threads. They hatch after five or six days. During the winter, this fish burrows into the soft substrate and remains dormant.

== Uses ==
The sheepshead minnow is commonly kept as an aquarium fish. It is easy to breed in captivity and is used as a forage fish in mariculture.

== Status ==
The sheepshead minnow has a wide range and a large total population, divided up into a number of subpopulations. The total number of individuals seems stable and no particular threats to the fish have been identified, so the IUCN has listed it as being of "Least concern". The sheepshead minnow is a eurytolerant fish able to withstand extreme temperatures and live in a wide range of environments. This species acclimates to different temperatures partly by altering the activity of enzymatic antioxidants in the body such as catalase, superoxide dismutase, and glutathione peroxidase. All of these enzyme antioxidants were altered within the fish's white muscle at extreme hot or cold temperatures in the lab, which may be one reason the fish showed no increase in lipid peroxidation damage. Although sheepshead minnows appear able to deal with oxidative stress caused by temperature extremes, they may be less adapted to cope with microplastics in their environment. Researchers found that when microplastics were ingested by the sheepshead minnow they decreased the fish's swimming behavior and caused changes in the expression of genes related to oxidative stress, immune responses, and apoptosis.
