= Cubanichthys pengelleyi =

Conservation status
- Endangered (IUCN 3.1)

Scientific classification
- Kingdom: Animalia
- Phylum: Chordata
- Class: Actinopterygii
- Division: Teleostei
- Order: Cyprinodontiformes
- Family: Cyprinodontidae
- Genus: Cubanichthys
- Species: C. pengelleyi

Binomial name
- Cubanichthys pengelleyi (Fowler, 1939)

Synonyms
- Chriopeoides pengelleyi Fowler, 1939

Species of fish

Cubanichthys pengelleyi, the Jamaican killifish, is a species of freshwater ray-finned fish belonging to the family Cyprinodontidae, the pupfishes, and the subfamily Cubanichthyinae, the island pupfishes. This killifish is endemic to Jamaica and is an endangered species.

== Taxonomy ==
Cubanichthys pengelleyi was first formally described in 1939 as Chriopeoides pengelleyi by the American zoologist Henry Weed Fowler with its type locality given as Jamaica. It is one of two species in the genus Cubanichthys , the other being Cubanichthys cubensis which is endemic to Cuba and the Isla de la Juventud. The genus Cubanichthys, along with Yssolebias, is classified in the island pupfish subfamily, Cubanichthyidae, of the pupfish family Cyprinodontidae.

== Etymology ==
Cubanichthys pengelleyi belongs to the genus Cubanichthys which prefixes the Greek word for "fish", -ichthys with Cuba, a name coined by Carl Leavitt Hubbs because he thought it was a monospecific gen endemic to Cuba. The specific name honours the Jamaican physician, medical officer and aquarist, who obtained the type.

== Description ==
Cubanichthys pengelleyi reaches a total length of 6 cm (2.4 in).

== Distribution and habitat ==
Cubanichthys pengelleyi is endemic to Jamaica. It is known fronm six locations, all in the Black River basin in Saint Elizabeth Parish in the southwest of the island. This species is found in clear, shallow, alkaline water with a bed made up of sand, with some sily.

== Biology ==
Cubanichthys pengelleyi hides within submerged and floating aquatic vegetation. It is a predatory, demersal fish which preys on damselfly and dragonfly nymphs, as well as other aquatic larvae, ostracods, copepods and gastropods.It lays eggs which have a diameter of 1.2 to 1.4 mm (0.047 to 0.055 in), hatching in around 9 days. It is not an annual species and can breed more than once.

== Conservation status ==
Cubanichthys pengelleyi is known from a small area where it is threatened by pollution, invasive non-native species, development and mining. The International Union for Conservation of Nature classify this species as Endangered.
