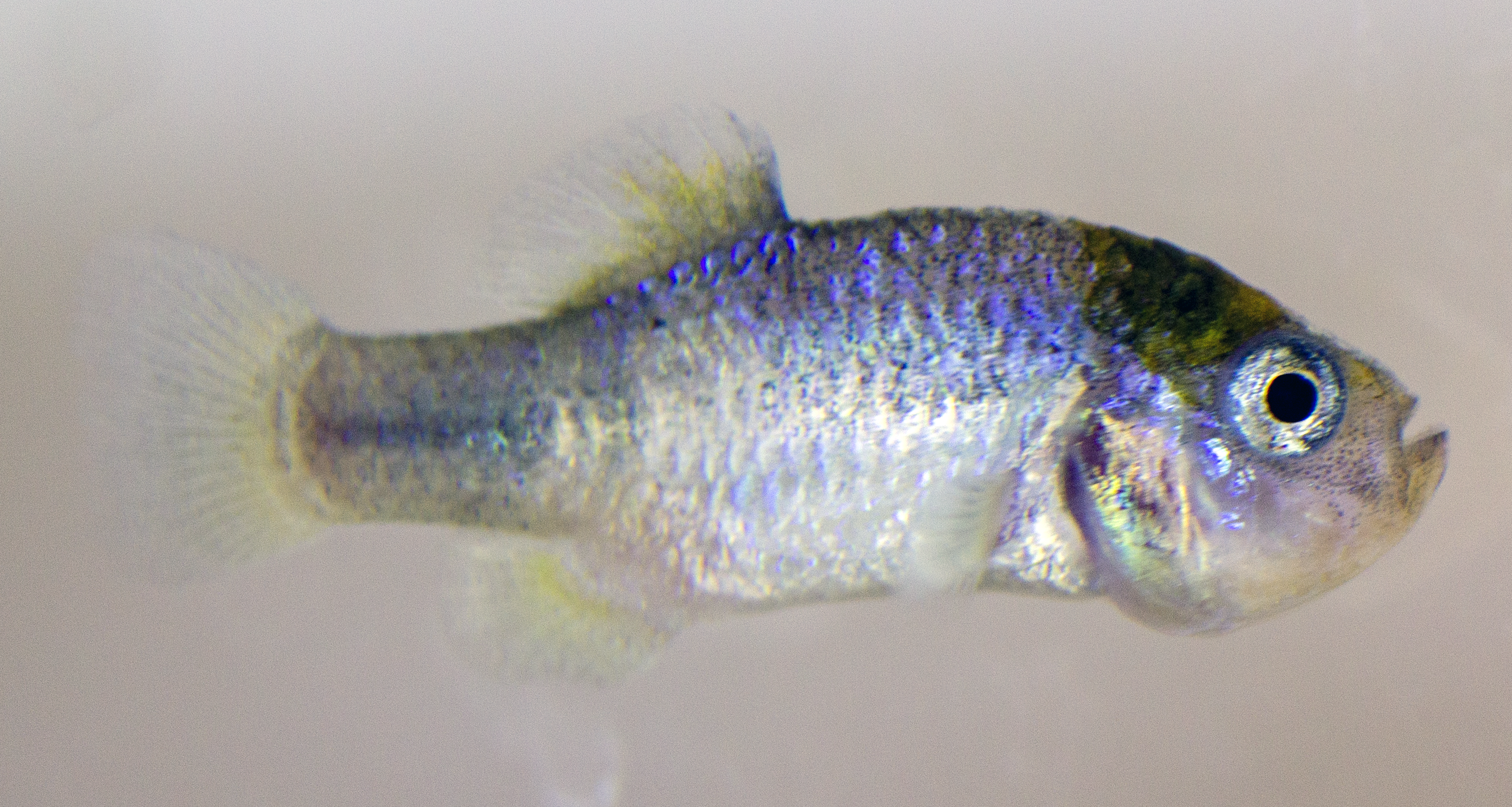
- The last Catarina pupfish, which died in 2014

Conservation status
- Extinct (2014) (IUCN 3.1)

Scientific classification
- Kingdom: Animalia
- Phylum: Chordata
- Class: Actinopterygii
- Order: Cyprinodontiformes
- Family: Cyprinodontidae
- Genus: †Megupsilon; R. R. Miller & Walters, 1972
- Species: †M. aporus

Binomial name
- †Megupsilon aporus R.R. Miller & Walters, 1972

= Catarina pupfish =

Species of fish

The Catarina pupfish (Megupsilon aporus) was a diminutive species of fish in the family Cyprinodontidae, first described in 1972. It was endemic to a spring in Nuevo León, Mexico. In an attempt of saving the rapidly declining species, some were brought into captivity in the late 1980s and early 1990s, but it proved very difficult to maintain. In 1994 it became extinct in the wild. Gradually the captive populations also perished. The last male (pictured in inset) died in 2014, and the species became extinct.

In addition to its small size, it was characterized by absence of pelvic girdle and pelvic fins, novel male reproductive behavior of jaw-nudging, a darkened dorsal patch, and by having different numbers of chromosomes in male and female fish due to a recent chromosomal fusion event. In 2013, its behavior was described based on very limited field observations of the previous wild population and more detailed observations in aquaria.

== Extinction ==
The Catarina pupfish is extinct. It was found in the wild in only one spring in southwestern Nuevo León, Mexico, together with Potosi pupfish (Cyprinodon alvarezi). In 1994, both species were "almost extinct" when their spring habitat essentially dried out; however, inspection of a side spring in November 1994 indicated that a few specimens remained. Subsequent publications indicated that both species had become extinct in the wild that year. The IUCN Red List also uses that designation, but cites an unpublished manuscript written earlier.

Mexico's 2010 official list of species at risk (NOM-059-SEMARNAT-2010) indicates that Megupsilon aporus is category "E", defined as "Probably extinct in the wild". Species that are considered extinct by experts are given that designation. However, if a species was rediscovered alive, it would be given legal protection status immediately.

In an attempt to save the Catarina pupfish, small numbers were brought into captivity in 1987 and 1992, but the species proved very difficult to maintain. Colonies were established in aquariums in Mexico, Europe, and the United States, but they gradually perished. By December 2012, only one colony remained: it consisted of about 20 fish at the Children's Aquarium at Fair Park in Dallas, Texas. In 2013, the last female in this colony died and only four eggs hatched, all male, resulting in functional extinction of the species. The last remaining males were then shipped individually to Chris Martin's laboratory at the University of California, Berkeley, for hybridization with Cyprinodon alvarezi in an attempt to save a hybrid population. Hybridization was successful, producing all-female F1 progeny as documented in an earlier study, but ultimately none of the backcross individuals survived more than a few weeks, most likely due to hybrid breakdown. In 2014, the last male individual of this colony died in Chris Martin's laboratory (photograph in inset), and with its demise, the species was fully extinct.

A number of Potosi pupfish, Cyprinodon alvarezi, a species restricted to the same spring as the Catarina pupfish, were also brought into captivity. They fared better, and today, populations are maintained at several aquariums and by private aquarists for conservation purposes. These can be used for a future reintroduction of the species back into the wild. The fate of the Catarina pupfish and Potosi pupfish are just two of many conservation issues in Mexico. As of 2008, approximately 40% of more than 500 described freshwater fishes in Mexico are considered to be at-risk, and there have been about 30 extinctions, mostly in the previous 50 years. The extinctions and threatened status of many freshwater fishes are associated with overexploitation, dewatering, habitat disruption, and competition with alien species of diverse sources. The inland fish fauna of Mexico is particularly vulnerable because many species (such as the Catarina pupfish) are endemic to isolated springs or small drainage systems as extensively described by Robert Rush Miller.

== Evolutionary history ==
Megupsilon aporus is the only known member of its genus. Based on a molecular clock analysis of mitochondrial DNA, it has been estimated that Megupsilon and Cyprinodon diverged from a common ancestor approximately 7 million years ago.

== Description ==
This species grew to a total length of 4 centimetres (1.6 in). It has been highlighted as one of the smallest fish in North America. The nape and sides of nuptial males were iridescent blue with a dark blotch at the base of the caudal peduncle. Mature females were golden olivaceous with an indistinct lateral band. There were no pelvic fins or pelvic girdle.

Miniaturization and lack of pelvic fins are also characteristic of the Devils Hole pupfish (Cyprinodon diabolis). An old-world pupfish, Aphanius apodus, and all South American Orestias pupfish species also lacks pelvic fins.

== Chromosomes ==
Megupsilon differs from Cyprinodon in having fewer chromosomes in males than in females (47 vs. 48). Males have a large Y chromosome, which appears to result from the fusion of two chromosomes: an autosome and the ancestral Y chromosome. The Megupsilon example was the first instance of autosome/Y chromosome fusion discovered in a fish. Subsequent research suggests that this type of chromosome fusion is relatively common; 35 examples have been found as of 2012. Among Cyprinodontidae species, Garmanella pulchra (Yucantan flagfish or Progreso flagfish) males also have one fewer chromosome than females.

== Behavior and morphology ==
Liu and Echelle (2013) describe its behavior and unusual morphology as follows:

"We provide the first description of behavior in the Catarina pupfish (Megupsilon aporus). Aggressive, courtship, and spawning behaviors resemble those of other North American cyprinodontids. However, M. aporus [Catarina pupfish] differs from others in the group in absence of breeding territoriality in males. Male M. aporus often perform opercular rotation during aggressive displays and jaw-nudging during courtship, behaviors that, among other North American cyprinodontids, are absent or known only in Floridichthys. Some unusual features of behavior (lack of territoriality) and morphology (dwarfism [=miniaturization]; absence of pelvic fins) in M. aporus might have been shaped by interaction with a cohabitant, the Potosi pupfish Cyprinodon alvarezi."

Opercular rotation observed during aggressive displays was described as outward flaring of opercules and branchiostegal rays. Jaw-nudging observed during courtship was described as repeated protraction and retraction of male premaxillaries during which the jaw occasionally touched the females head (significance of the touching undetermined).

The hypothesis that Megupsilon behavior and morphology might have been shaped by interaction with the other pupfish stems from the observation by Miller and Walters (1972) in the original description of the genus and species. In aggressive interactions between them, the larger Cyprinodon species dominated Megupsilon, which seemed to restrict its distribution to shallow, highly vegetated parts of the spring. Liu and Echelle (2013) theorized that the restricted habitat may have influenced its evolution. They also offered a contrary hypothesis that this species is a relict of a larger group of Megupsilon species in which miniaturization and absence of pelvic fins were characteristic.

Miniaturization and absence of pelvic fins in Catarina pupfish may be linked with each other. Studies indicate that miniaturization is often associated with morphological novelty. Also, numerous examples of adaptation of bone growth to miniaturization in fish, amphibians and reptiles have been noted; these include skeletal reductions such as reduced ossification or complete loss of the pelvic girdle.

Some of the variability in behavior and morphology among pupfishes may be a response to harsh environmental conditions mediated by endocrine systems. Studies of specific endocrine systems which foster phenotypic plasticity in fishes and the evolution of endocrine pathways are underway.
