= Orestias ascotanensis =

Scientific classification
- Domain: Eukaryota
- Kingdom: Animalia
- Phylum: Chordata
- Class: Actinopterygii
- Order: Cyprinodontiformes
- Family: Cyprinodontidae
- Genus: Orestias
- Species: O. ascotanensis

Binomial name
- Orestias ascotanensis Parenti, 1984

Species of fish

Orestias ascotanensis is a species of freshwater ray-finned fish within the family Cyprinodontidae, endemic to 12 springs in the Ascotán Salt Flat in Chile. It grows to a length of 7.5 centimeters.
