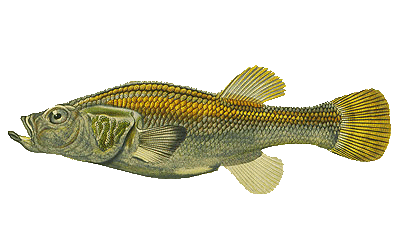
- Orestias cuvieri

Scientific classification
- Kingdom: Animalia
- Phylum: Chordata
- Class: Actinopterygii
- Order: Cyprinodontiformes
- Family: Cyprinodontidae
- Genus: Orestias; Valenciennes, 1839

Type species
- Orestias cuvieri Valenciennes, 1846

= Orestias (fish) =

Genus of fishes

Orestias is a genus of pupfish. Older systematics classified them into the own family Orestiidae. They are found in lakes, rivers and springs in the Andean highlands of South America, and several species are considered threatened. They are egg-laying fish that feed on small animals and plant matter. The largest species can reach a total length of 27 cm (10.6 in), but most remain far smaller. Their most characteristic feature is the absence of the ventral fin, although this is shared by a few other pupfish. Despite their moderate to small size, they are important to local fisheries and a few species are farmed.

Several species are locally and colloquially known as carache. The name of the genus is a reference to Orestes, a Greek mythological character who Valenciennes described as the "nymph of the mountains".

== Range and habitat ==
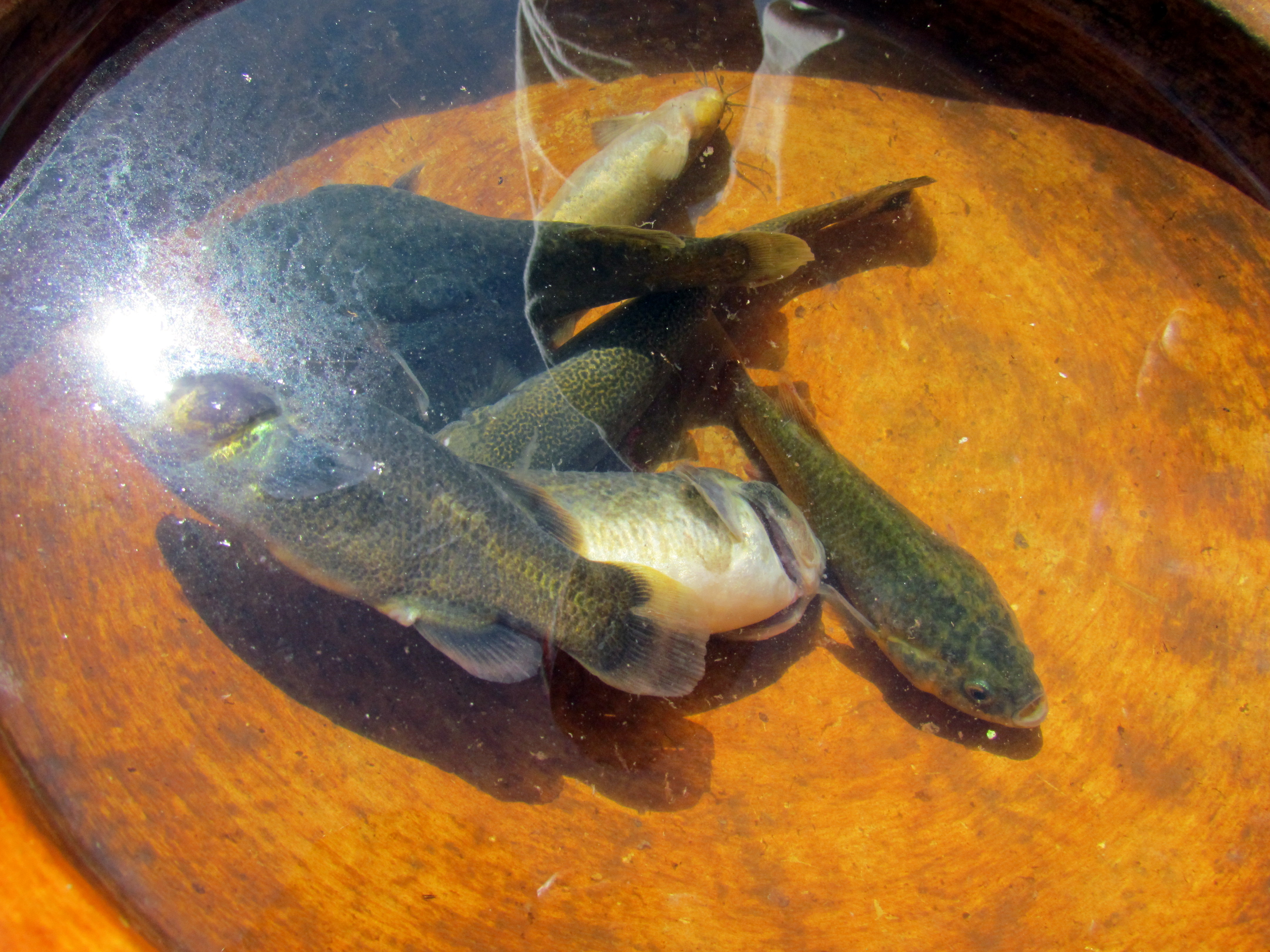
Four Orestias (possibly O. luteus) and two Trichomycterus catfish caught in Lake Titicaca, the center of Orestias richness

Orestias is restricted to freshwater habitats at an altitude of 2,800–4,600 m (9,200–15,100 ft) in the Andes of central and southern Peru, western Bolivia, and northeastern Chile. Although freshwater habitats at low and middle altitudes in the Andes are relatively rich in fish, few are found in the highest, with Orestias and the catfish Astroblepus and Trichomycterus being the primary—in many places only—native genera. Of the 45 recognized species of Orestias, the majority are found in Lake Titicaca (including 23 endemics to its basin), with the remaining from other Altiplano lakes, rivers or springs. In addition to differences in feeding, the many species in Lake Titicaca segregate by habitat preference, with some living among totora reeds, some among submerged macrophytes, some at the bottom in water too deep for macrophytes (deeper than 10 m or 33 ft), and some pelagically in the open water. Orestias species found elsewhere than Lake Titicaca often have very small ranges.

== Behavior ==
Relatively little is known about the behavior of Orestias.

They feed on small crustaceans (such as amphipods and cladocera), aquatic insects and larvae (such as chironomids), snails, small fish, fish eggs, algae, macrophyte seeds and plant detritus. There are significant variations depending on exact species, especially in Lake Titicaca where there is a degree of niche differentiation, including some that mainly feed on zooplanktonic organisms, two (O. albus and O. cuvieri) that are particularly willing to take other fish, primarily smaller Orestias (fish eggs are regularly consumed by a wider range of species), several that mainly feed on small bottom- or plant-living organisms, and some that are generalists that will feed on a wide range of things, sometimes varying depending on season.

Females tend to grow larger than males. Although generally rather dull-coloured, breeding males may become partially yellow or orange. The eggs, up to a few hundred, are placed in shallow water among vegetation. Orestias appear to reach maturity when around one year old.

== Conservation and relationship to humans ==
Many species of the genus became rare in recent decades due to predation by, and competition with introduced fish species (especially rainbow trout and Argentinian silverside), pollution, overfishing and other human activities in their habitats. In the 1960s, an expedition to Lake Titicaca led by Jacques Cousteau reported seeing many dead Orestias and when studied they were found to be infected by a disease introduced with the trout.

The two largest species in the genus, the Titicaca orestias (O. cuvieri) at up to 22 cm (8.7 in) in standard length and 27 cm (10.6 in) in total length, and O. pentlandii up to 20 cm (7.9 in) and 23.5 cm (9.3 in) respectively, have fared the worst. The Titicaca orestias was last seen in 1939 and is almost certainly extinct. O. pentlandii is from the same lake and it may have disappeared in its native form. It was still regarded as "only" vulnerable by the IUCN in 2009, but in 2014 the species was regarded as critically endangered in a review of Lake Titicaca fish. In the 1990s, some were introduced to a small highland lake in Peru in an attempt of safeguarding the species, but over time they have changed (possibly due to genetic drift, inbreeding depression, or their new and different habitat) and now appear very different from the original O. pentlandii of Lake Titicaca. The remaining Orestias of Lake Titicaca are also threatened to various degrees, as are the three species in Lake Junin and its vicinity, which in turn may threaten the Lake Junin giant frog that feeds on the fish and invertebrates. Many Orestias found elsewhere are vulnerable because of their highly restricted ranges, like O. ascotanensis where the entire habitat covers 18 km^{2} (7 sq mi) of Salar de Ascotán and O. chungarensis found only in Lake Chungará.

Despite their moderate to small size, some species are important to local fisheries, but they are overfished, there are few regulations and limited enforcement of the rules that do exist. In Lake Titicaca, the moderately sized O. agassizii and O. luteus (complexes) represent more than 90% of the total catches of native fish species, but others like the small open-water ispi (O. forgeti and O. ispi) are also frequently caught. The natives have now been greatly surpassed by fisheries for the non-native introduced trout and Argentinian silverside. Because of pollution, studies have revealed levels of metals in Orestias of Lake Titicaca that exceed the internationally recommended safety thresholds for human consumption. O. agassizii and O. luteus are also farmed and spawned in captivity; both to supply the food market and for release to support their vulnerable wild populations.

== Species and taxonomy ==
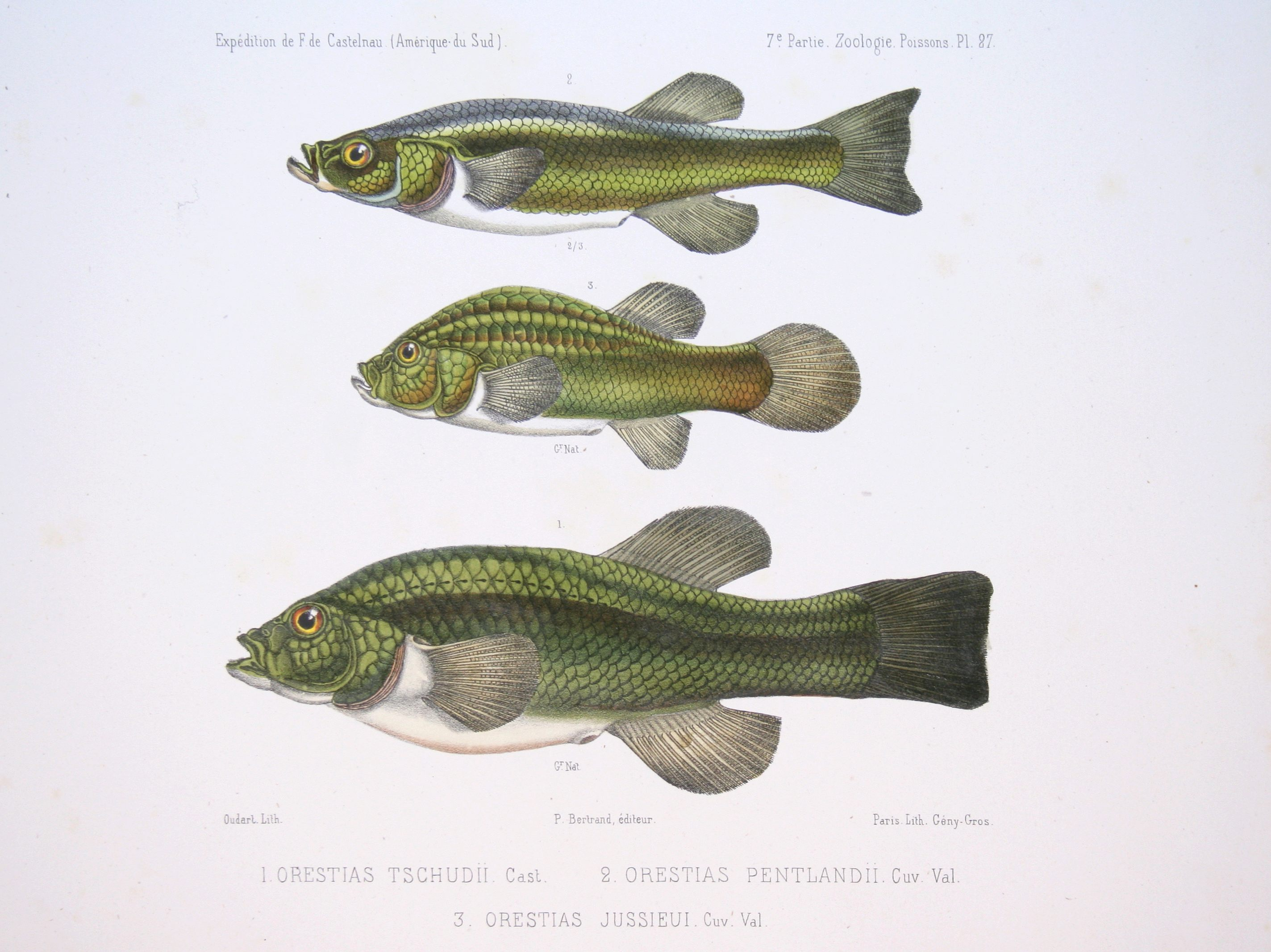
Three Orestias species showing some of the variations in shape in this genus

There are currently 45 recognized species in this genus, divided depending on their relationships into four species complexes. The genus is estimated to be 5 million years old, with a significant diversification occurring within the last one million years. Lüssen (2003) researched the phylogeny of several species including mtDNA sequence data; because hybridization is known to occur (Villwock 1964, Parenti 1984), mtDNA data cannot be relied upon on its own to resolve the evolution of this genus. For example, O. agassizii and O. luteus reach a similar maximum standard length of c. 17 cm (6.5 in), but otherwise they are quite different. Despite this, hybrids between them are known.

=== Agassizii species complex ===
Some species restricted to the Lake Titicaca basin (which includes the inflowing rivers and connected smaller lakes like Arapa, Lagunillas and Saracocha), and some restricted to other lakes, rivers and springs elsewhere in the Andean highlands. O. agassizii (often spelled agassii instead) is the only member of the genus found both in the Lake Titicaca basin and elsewhere.

- Orestias agassizii Valenciennes, 1846 (Carache Negro)
- Orestias albus Valenciennes, 1846 (Carache Amarillo)
- Orestias ascotanensis Parenti, 1984
- Orestias chungarensis Vila & M. Pinto, 1987
- Orestias ctenolepis Parenti, 1984
- Orestias elegans Garman, 1895
- Orestias empyraeus W. R. Allen, 1942
- Orestias frontosus Cope, 1876
- Orestias gloriae Vila, S. Scott, Méndez, Valenzuela, Iturra & Poulin, 2012
- Orestias gymnotus Parenti, 1984
- Orestias hardini Parenti, 1984
- Orestias jussiei Valenciennes, 1846 (Carache Amarillo)
- Orestias lastarriae Philippi {Krumweide}, 1876
- Orestias laucaensis Arratia, 1982
- Orestias luteus Valenciennes, 1846 (Carache Amarillo)
- Orestias multiporis Parenti, 1984
- Orestias mundus Parenti, 1984
- Orestias olivaceus Garman, 1895
- Orestias parinacotensis Arratia, 1982
- Orestias piacotensis Vila, 2006
- Orestias polonorum Tchernavin, 1944
- Orestias puni Tchernavin, 1944 — likely a synonym of O. jussiei
- Orestias richersoni Parenti, 1984
- Orestias silustani W. R. Allen, 1942
- Orestias tschudii Castelnau, 1855
- Orestias ututo Parenti, 1984

=== Cuvieri species complex ===
All restricted to the Lake Titicaca basin.

- Orestias cuvieri Valenciennes, 1846 (Titicaca Orestias, Amanto; likely extinct (mid-20th century))
- Orestias forgeti Lauzanne, 1981 (Ispi)
- Orestias ispi Lauzanne, 1981 (Ispi)
- Orestias pentlandii Valenciennes, 1846 (Boga)

=== Gilsoni species complex ===
All restricted to the Lake Titicaca basin.

- Orestias gilsoni Tchernavin, 1944
- Orestias imarpe Parenti, 1984
- Orestias minimus Tchernavin, 1944
- Orestias minutus Tchernavin, 1944 — likely a synonym of O. minimus
- Orestias mooni Tchernavin, 1944
- Orestias robustus Parenti, 1984
- Orestias taquiri Tchernavin, 1944
- Orestias tchernavini Lauzanne, 1981
- Orestias tomcooni Parenti, 1984
- Orestias uruni Tchernavin, 1944

=== Mulleri species complex ===
All restricted to the Lake Titicaca basin.

- Orestias crawfordi Tchernavin, 1944
- Orestias gracilis Parenti, 1984
- Orestias incae Garman, 1895
- Orestias mulleri Valenciennes, 1846
- Orestias tutini Tchernavin, 1944
