= Orestias chungarensis =

Conservation status
- Vulnerable (IUCN 2.3)

Scientific classification
- Kingdom: Animalia
- Phylum: Chordata
- Class: Actinopterygii
- Order: Cyprinodontiformes
- Family: Cyprinodontidae
- Genus: Orestias
- Species: O. chungarensis

Binomial name
- Orestias chungarensis Vila & M. Pinto, 1987

Species of fish

Orestias chungarensis is a species of fish in the family Cyprinodontidae. It is endemic to Lake Chungara in Chile.
