= Orestias laucaensis =

Conservation status
- Endangered (IUCN 3.1)

Scientific classification
- Kingdom: Animalia
- Phylum: Chordata
- Class: Actinopterygii
- Division: Teleostei
- Order: Cyprinodontiformes
- Family: Cyprinodontidae
- Genus: Orestias
- Species: O. laucaensis

Binomial name
- Orestias laucaensis Arratia, 1982

Species of fish

Orestias laucaensis is a species of fish in the family Cyprinodontidae. It is endemic to the Lauca River in Chile.
