= Potosi pupfish =

Cyprinodon alvarezi

Conservation status
- Extinct in the Wild (IUCN 3.1)

Scientific classification
- Kingdom: Animalia
- Phylum: Chordata
- Class: Actinopterygii
- Order: Cyprinodontiformes
- Family: Cyprinodontidae
- Genus: Cyprinodon
- Species: C. alvarezi

Binomial name
- Cyprinodon alvarezi R. R. Miller, 1976

Species of fish

Potosi pupfish (Cyprinodon alvarezi) is a species of fish in the family Cyprinodontidae. It is endemic to Mexico, but is now extinct in the wild, only surviving in captivity.

== Distribution ==
The Potosi pupfish is endemic to an isolated spring known as Ojo de Potosi near El Potosi, a settlement in southwestern Nuevo Leon state in Mexico. However, the species is now regarded as being extinct in the wild, and is represented only by captive populations.

== Habitat and extinction in the wild ==
The Potosi pupfish is endemic to a clear spring-fed pool in an endorheic basin known as 'La Hediondilla' near the foot of Cerro Potosi. The pool had a maximum depth of 2.5 metres (8 ft 2 in), and surface area of 10,000 m^{2} (110,000 sq ft), covered by abundant vegetation including Ceratophyllum, Najas, Nasturtium, and Utricularia. Sparse clumps of Typha and Scirpus were also present in the spring. A large earthen and rock dam enlarged the original pool, and a series of seeps and secondary outflows created distributaries that ran 1–1.5 km (0.62–0.93 mi) downstream. The Potosi pupfish shared the pools with the Catarina pupfish (Megupsilon aporus) and the crayfish Cambarellus alvarezi, which are both fully extinct. In addition, the introduced goldfish (Carassius auratus) had sustained a small population from its introduction (which may have occurred before 1961), and largemouth bass (Micropterus salmoides), which had become common in the deeper central pond, with some individuals growing to 30 cm (12 in) in total length. No large individuals of the endemic species were found, and populations had declined precipitously. From 1968 to 1983 the ecosystem remained relatively stable, with water levels fluctuating 0.2–0.3 meters, and losing 10% of the pond's surface area. By 1984, the water level had dropped 1.5 meters, and the pond had lost 90% of its former surface area. On October 26, 1985, the water level dropped another 0.3 meters, and by the next summer no water was left in the pool or reservoir, limiting the distribution of the cyprinodontids and the crustacean to the small side springs downstream from the former pond. In conclusion, the species had become extinct in the wild due to invasive species and habitat alteration. Potosi pupfish are maintained in aquariums in both North America and Europe, and can be used as a basis for reintroducing it back into the wild in the future.

== Description ==
Fin of nuptial male is white, milky or bluish white, the terminal black caudal fin bar is broad (wider than the pupil). Dorsal and anal fin of nuptial male has milky white edge, pelvic is bluish. Pectoral fins are grey-black. The interradial membranes of the rest of the caudal fin are immaculate in both sexes. Nuptial males are typically without vertical bars. Both sexes possess a long mandible and prominent lower jaw and reduced pelvic fins. Mature individuals are typically 50–60 mm (2.0–2.4 in) in standard length.

Details on the number and presence of various characteristics of the Potosi pupfish, as collected by R.R. Miller:

Feature	Number/Presence
Lateral scales	24–26 (typically 25)
Gill-rakers	16–20 (typically 17–19)
Vertebrae	26–27 (predominantly 26)
Mandibular pores	2
Branchiostegal rays	5–6
Scales around Caudal Peduncle	14–16 (typically 16)
Scales around body	30–34 (typically 32)
Lacrimal pores	2–5 (typically 4)
Dorsal-fin ocellus	Well developed in female/juvenile, males of <37mm (SL) may have remnants
Fin rays: 1. Dorsal; 2. Anal; 3. Pectoral; 4. Pelvic; 5. Caudal	1. 10-12 (usually 10-11); 2. 9-11 (usually 10); 3. 13-17 (usually 15 or 16); 4. 5-7 (usually 6); 5. 16-20 (usually 17-19)
Scales: 1. Lateral; 2. Dorsal-anal	1. 24-26 (usually 25); 2. 10–12 (usually 11–12)

== Etymology ==
The Potosi pupfish's scientific name Cyprinodon alvarezi honours Jose Alvarez del Villar (1903–1986) who had originally intended to describe the species, but had given the type, which he had collected in 1952, to Robert Rush Miller who took on the task of describing it.
