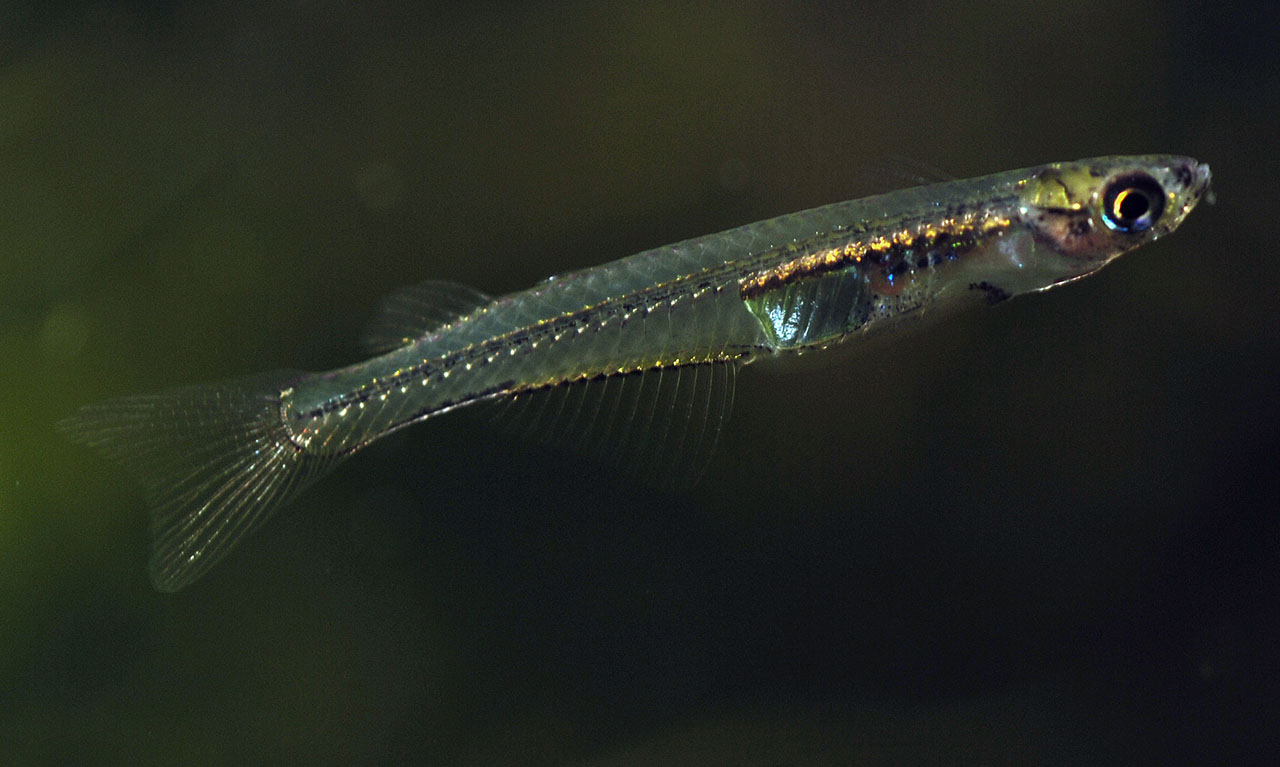
- Neostethus lankesteri

Scientific classification
- Kingdom: Animalia
- Phylum: Chordata
- Class: Actinopterygii
- Order: Atheriniformes
- Family: Phallostethidae
- Subfamily: Phallostethinae
- Genus: Neostethus; Regan, 1916

Type species
- Neostethus lankesteri Regan, 1916

Synonyms
- Plectrostethus G. S. Myers, 1935; Ceratostethus G. S. Myers, 1937; Ctenophallus Herre, 1939; Sandakanus Herre, 1942; Solenophallus Herre, 1953

= Neostethus =

Genus of fishes

Neostethus is a genus of fishes in the family Phallostethidae, native to freshwater and brackish habitats in southeast Asia, with the majority of the species restricted to the Philippines.

== Species ==
There are currently 12 recognized species in this genus:

- Neostethus amaricola (Villadolid & Manacop, 1934)
- Neostethus bicornis Regan, 1916
- Neostethus borneensis Herre, 1939
- Neostethus ctenophorus (Aurich, 1937)
- Neostethus geminus Parenti, 2014
- Neostethus djajaorum Parenti & Louie, 1998
- Neostethus lankesteri Regan, 1916
- Neostethus palawanensis (G. S. Myers, 1935)
- Neostethus robertsi Parenti, 1989
- Neostethus thessa (Aurich, 1937)
- Neostethus villadolidi Herre, 1942
- Neostethus zamboangae Herre, 1942
