= Phallostethus =

Scientific classification
- Domain: Eukaryota
- Kingdom: Animalia
- Phylum: Chordata
- Class: Actinopterygii
- Order: Atheriniformes
- Family: Phallostethidae
- Subfamily: Phallostethinae
- Genus: Phallostethus; Regan, 1913

Type species
- Phallostethus dunckeri Regan, 1913

Species
- 3 recognized species, see article.

Genus of fishes

Phallostethus is a small genus of fishes in the family Phallostethidae native to freshwater and brackish habitats in southeast Asia.

== Species ==
The currently recognized species in this genus are:

- Phallostethus cuulong Shibukawa, Đ. Đ. Trần & X. L. Trần, 2012
- Phallostethus dunckeri Regan, 1913
- Phallostethus lehi Parenti, 1996
