= Phenacostethus =

Scientific classification
- Kingdom: Animalia
- Phylum: Chordata
- Class: Actinopterygii
- Order: Atheriniformes
- Family: Phallostethidae
- Subfamily: Phallostethinae
- Genus: Phenacostethus; G. S. Myers, 1928

Type species
- Phenacostethus smithi Myers, 1928

Genus of fishes

Phenacostethus is a genus of fishes in the family Phallostethidae found in freshwater and brackish habitats in southeast Asia.

== Species ==
The currently recognized species in this genus are:

- Phenacostethus posthon T. R. Roberts, 1971
- Phenacostethus sikat Parenti, Lumbantobing & Haryono, 2023
- Phenacostethus smithi G. S. Myers, 1928 (Smith's priapium fish)
- Phenacostethus trewavasae Parenti, 1986
