= Neostethus thessa =

Conservation status
- Endangered (IUCN 3.1)

Scientific classification
- Kingdom: Animalia
- Phylum: Chordata
- Class: Actinopterygii
- Order: Atheriniformes
- Family: Phallostethidae
- Genus: Neostethus
- Species: N. thessa

Binomial name
- Neostethus thessa (Aurich, 1937)

Synonyms
- Solenophallus thessa Aurich, 1937

Species of fish from the Philippines

Neostethus thessa, locally known as bolinao, is a species of freshwater priapium fish endemic to Lake Mainit, Mindanao, Philippines. It is classified as Endangered by the IUCN Red List of Threatened Species due to its highly restricted range which is threatened by pollution and the introduction of invasive species of fish.

== Taxonomy ==
Neostethus thessa was first described as Solenophallus thessa by the German ichthyologist Horst Joachim Aurich in 1937. It is a member of the genus Neostethus in the priapium fish family Phallostethidae

== Distribution and habitat ==
Neostethus thessa is only found in Lake Mainit in northeastern Mindanao in the Philippines.

== Description ==
Neostethus thessa swim in schools and feed near the surface of the water. They are small fish, reaching a length of only around 2.6 cm (1.0 in) for males and 2.9 cm (1.1 in) for females. They are transparent to opaque gray in color. Like other priapium fish (and the origin of their common name), the males are distinguished by a muscular clasping organ from modified fins found under their "chin". These are used by the males for mating with females via internal fertilization. The females attach their eggs to surfaces by sticky filaments.

== Conservation and uses ==
Neostethus thessa is classified as Endangered by the IUCN Red List of Threatened Species. The lake it inhabits is only 173.40 km^{2} (66.95 sq mi) and is threatened by pollution from mining and agriculture runoffs and waste from residential areas around the lake. It is also threatened by the introduction of invasive species of fish, including the Nile tilapia and the Eurasian carp.

Neostethus thessa is caught for food with fine-meshed nets.
