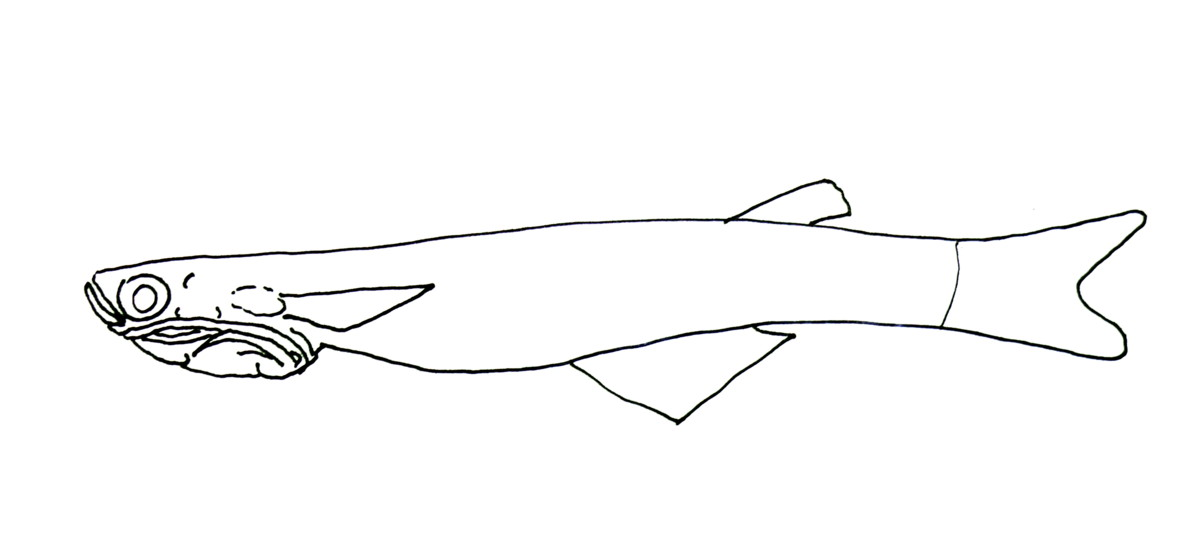

Scientific classification
- Kingdom: Animalia
- Phylum: Chordata
- Class: Actinopterygii
- Order: Atheriniformes
- Family: Phallostethidae
- Genus: Phallostethus
- Species: P. cuulong

Binomial name
- Phallostethus cuulong Shibukawa, Đ. Đ. Trần & X. L. Trần, 2012

= Phallostethus cuulong =

Species of fish

Phallostethus cuulong is a species of fish in the family Phallostethidae. It was discovered in 2009 and described in 2012. This species is found at depths of 0.5 to 3.5 m (1.6 to 11.5 ft) in tidal canals on the Mekong Delta. This species attains about 25 mm (0.98 in) in standard length and is translucent white. Males have their gonads under the chin – along with a serrated saw and rod for grasping females. The name cuulong is from the Vietnamese name of the river system where they are found, Cửu Long River.
