= Phallostethus dunckeri =

Conservation status
- Vulnerable (IUCN 3.1)

Scientific classification
- Kingdom: Animalia
- Phylum: Chordata
- Class: Actinopterygii
- Order: Atheriniformes
- Family: Phallostethidae
- Genus: Phallostethus
- Species: P. dunckeri

Binomial name
- Phallostethus dunckeri Regan, 1913

Species of fish

Phallostethus dunckeri is a species of fish in the family Phallostethidae. It is endemic to Malaysia.

== Environment ==
Phallostethus dunckeri is recorded to be found in a freshwater environment within a pelagic depth range. This species is native to a tropical climate.

== Distribution ==
Phallostethus dunckeri is native to the areas of Asia and Malaysia.

== Biology ==
The eggs of Phallostethus dunckeri are fertilised internally and then after laying they are attached to the substrate by adhesive filaments.

== Taxonomy and naming ==
Phallostethus dunckeri is the type species of the genus Phallostethus. It was described by Charles Tate Regan in 1913 with a type locality of the Muar River, Johor in Malaysia. Regan honoured the German ichthyologist Georg Duncker (1870–1953) of the Zoologisches Museum Hamburg, Duncker initially wrote about this species in 1904 but he was too busy to write a description so he passed some of his specimens on to Regan for him to describe.
