= Orestias elegans =

Orestias elegans may refer to:

- Orestias elegans (fish), a species of fish
- Orestias elegans (plant), a species of orchids
