= Orestias parinacotensis =

Conservation status
- Endangered (IUCN 3.1)

Scientific classification
- Kingdom: Animalia
- Phylum: Chordata
- Class: Actinopterygii
- Division: Teleostei
- Order: Cyprinodontiformes
- Family: Cyprinodontidae
- Genus: Orestias
- Species: O. parinacotensis

Binomial name
- Orestias parinacotensis Arratia, 1982

Species of fish

Orestias parinacotensis, locally known as karachi, is a species of pupfish in the family Cyprinodontidae. It is endemic to northern Chile. This fish was described in 1982 by María Gloria Eliana Arratia Fuentes from a type locality given as a wetland near the hamlet of Parinacota, Chile called the Bofedales de Parinacota.

In salar Ascotán the species was devastated by the extraction of water by the copper mining. Since the 2020s the species is threatened by the expansion of the lithium extraction.
