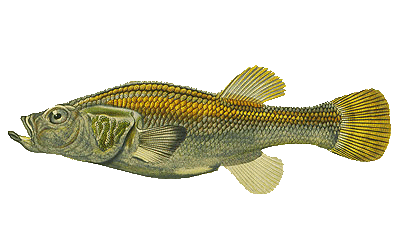

Conservation status
- Critically endangered, possibly extinct (IUCN 3.1)

Scientific classification
- Kingdom: Animalia
- Phylum: Chordata
- Class: Actinopterygii
- Order: Cyprinodontiformes
- Family: Cyprinodontidae
- Genus: Orestias
- Species: O. cuvieri

Binomial name
- Orestias cuvieri Valenciennes, 1846

Synonyms
- Orestias humboldti Valenciennes, 1846

= Titicaca orestias =

Species of fish

The Titicaca orestias, Lake Titicaca orestias, or Lake Titicaca flat-headed fish (Orestias cuvieri), also known by its native name amanto, is a likely extinct freshwater killifish from Lake Titicaca in South America. It belongs in the pupfish genus Orestias, endemic to lakes, rivers and streams in the Andean highlands. With a total length of up to 27 cm (10.6 in), it was the largest member in that genus. In the hope that an undiscovered population remains, it is listed as Critically Endangered, possibly extinct by the IUCN. Despite its common name, it is not the only Orestias from Lake Titicaca.

Its mouth was nearly turned upwards, thereby giving the flat head a concave shape. The head took up nearly a third of the whole body length. The upperside was greenish-yellow to umber. The lower jaw was black. Its scales were oddly light coloured at their centre. The scales of the young were blotched.

The Titicaca orestias became extinct due to competition by introduced trout like the lake trout, brown trout, or the rainbow trout as well as Argentinian silverside from the 1930s to the 1950s. A survey in 1962 failed to find any Titicaca orestias.

== History ==
Orestias cuvieri is a species of killfish that belongs in the genus Orestias. Other related species of Orestias live in the region, forming a species flock.

== Anatomy ==
The Titicaca orestias was characterized by a unique pattern of pores on the head. Large thick scales lined the median dorsal ridge and thinner smaller scales surrounded the ridge. Between these two areas of skin were patches with no scales. Unlike most other species of Orestias, the scales of the adult O. cuvieri were granulated. The concave dish shape of its body and jaw further helped distinguish O. cuvieri from other species of Orestias. The anatomy of O. cuvieri closely resembled a species of trout which is now found in Lake Titicaca, a similarity which has led many researchers to hypothesize that competition between the two groups was the reason for the extinction of O. cuvieri.

=== Size ===
Each species of Orestias has varying size. The Titicaca orestias was the largest species in the genus. The maximum recorded size is 22 cm (8.7 in) in standard length and 27 cm (10.6 in) in total length, which is considerably larger than most other species; only O. pentlandii at up to 20 cm (7.9 in) and 23.5 cm (9.3 in), respectively, comes close.

=== Coloration and markings ===
With regard to the coloration of the amanto during their lifetime, specimens present black melanophores laterally as a band on the lateral line and as small groups on the upper lateral sides. Small melanophores cover the fins giving them a grayish color. The grayish color fades to white on the dorsum and belly; juvenile pigmentation pattern persists with little modification in adult males and females. This information shows that the color of the Orestias in question depends on what part of the body is being considered.

== Life history ==
=== Reproduction ===
Nothing has been published about the reproduction of the Titicaca orestias, but in other Orestias species of Lake Titicaca, the males become more orange or yellow in color when they are spawning. During their reproductive stage, the females lay somewhere between 50 and 400 eggs, each of which has a yellowish filament up to about 2.5 mm in diameter. As an adaptation to solar radiation, the eggs develop a black protective coat, derived from melanophores, around the embryo sac.

== Ecology ==
=== Range and habitat ===
The freshwater fish belonging to the genus Orestias are found in high-altitude isolated lakes in the Altiplano region of South America, ranging from Peru to Chile. Lake Titicaca, which is on the border of Peru and Bolivia, contains a wide variety of Orestias fish. This large lake was once the home to Orestias cuvieri before their extinction.

=== Population, trends and predation ===
At one time, there were as many as 30 native fish species in Lake Titicaca, of which 28 species belonged to the genus Orestias. In the middle of the 20th century, there were many attempts to introduce exotic species to the lake. Two of these introductions were successful: rainbow trout introduced in 1942 and silverside (Odontesthes bonariensis) in the early 1950s. The success of the silverside meant the decline of the Titicaca orestias, since the larger silversides were observed to eat them. As long as the silverside continued to flourish, it meant difficult times for the amanto. Fifty years ago, there was no sign of Orestias cuvieri in Lake Titicaca and the species was presumed to be extinct.

=== Feeding ===
O. cuvieri mainly ate smaller fish.

== Human interaction ==
Since the Miocene era, species of Orestias have lived in relative isolation. Most of the aquatic regions in the Altiplano region are endorheic, meaning that they are closed off from drainage and do not let any water out. Thus, species of Orestias have been confined to their respective basins. Each group of fish is specifically adapted to the unique basin in which it lives and any alteration to the dynamics of the body of water would greatly impact the fish. Human introduction of foreign fishes to the Altiplano basins predictably had negative consequences. The alien species created competition and preyed upon Orestias cuvieri, eventually leading to its extinction.

Pollutants contaminate the water and traces of metals, such as zinc and copper, have been found in the tissues of fishes. In addition, runoff from fertilizers and pesticides used in agricultural lands has been extremely toxic to the fish. The water from the Altiplano region is also in high demand. People have constantly been taking water out of the basins and depleting the Orestias habitats. The compilation of the effects of human actions have harmfully affected the health and survival of different species of Orestias, in particular the species O. cuvieri. Thus, the extinction of the Titicaca orestias is largely anthropogenic.

== Conservation ==
=== Law enforcement ===
With regard to law enforcement, major efforts are still needed to prevent pollution and illegal fishing. These efforts need to be made specifically on the area, between Peru and Bolivia, of Lake Titicaca. O cuvieri has likely already become extinct. Other native species, including the suche (Trichomycterus rivulatus), boga (O. pentlandii), yellow karachi (O. albus) and ispi (O. ispi), are threatened to various degrees, as a result of overfishing, predation by introduced species, and the impacts of intensive production in trout farms. This idea of law enforcement is particularly challenging because of the immense body of water that would need patrolling. Actions to be on the lookout for by law enforcement should include long casting; where a long line (over 100 kilometers in some instances) is cast and other unintended fish are caught. Perhaps more importantly though is to be on the lookout, as an entity of law enforcement for pollution.

== Museum specimens ==
The National Museum of Natural History in the Netherlands, Naturalis, has several specimens. Two of these specimens were donated by the Zoological Museum at Heidelberg University in 1877 and one in 1880 from the Smithsonian Institution. In addition, four specimens, labeled "Orestias humboldti" were donated by the Muséum national d'histoire naturelle in France.

== Related species ==
Scientists have determined that there are 44 species of the genus Orestias. These species were divided into four groups by the American ichthyologist Lynne R. Parenti in 1984. In 2003, Arne Lüssen researched the phylogeny, including the mtDNA sequence data of many species. The Lake Titicaca orestias, O. cuvieri, is a member of the cuvieri species complex, which also includes O. forgeti, O. ispi and O. pentlandii.
