= Gulaphallus =

Scientific classification
- Kingdom: Animalia
- Phylum: Chordata
- Class: Actinopterygii
- Order: Atheriniformes
- Family: Phallostethidae
- Subfamily: Gulaphallinae; Aurich, 1937
- Genus: Gulaphallus; Herre, 1925

Type species
- Gulaphallus eximius Herre, 1925

Species
- 5 recognized species, see article.

Genus of fishes

Gulaphallus is a genus of fishes in the family Phallostethidae, native to the Philippines. They are mainly found in freshwater habitats, but G. panayensis is from brackish and marine habitats. It is the only genus in the subfamily Gulaphallinae.

== Species ==
The currently recognized species in this genus are:

- Gulaphallus bikolanus (Herre, 1926)
- Gulaphallus eximius Herre, 1925
- Gulaphallus falcifer Manacop, 1936
- Gulaphallus mirabilis Herre, 1925
- Gulaphallus panayensis (Herre, 1942)
