= Yssolebias =

Scientific classification
- Kingdom: Animalia
- Phylum: Chordata
- Class: Actinopterygii
- Division: Teleostei
- Order: Cyprinodontiformes
- Family: Cyprinodontidae
- Genus: Yssolebias; Huber, 2012
- Species: Y. martae

Binomial name
- Yssolebias martae (Steindachner, 1875)

Synonyms
- Cyprinodon martae Steindachner, 1875

Species of fish

Yssolebias martae is a species of fish in the family Cyprinodontidae only known from the Río Magdalena near Santa Marta, Colombia. This species is poorly known and may possibly be extinct with only one specimen (the holotype) known. Long of questioned validity and uncertain generic attribution, in 2012 J. H. Huber erected the genus Yssolebias to contain this enigmatic species. This species is the only known member of its genus. This species is placed in the tribe Yssolebiini. It has been suggested that this species is a member of the genus Cubanichthys.
