= Pseudorestias =

Scientific classification
- Kingdom: Animalia
- Phylum: Chordata
- Class: Actinopterygii
- Order: Cyprinodontiformes
- Family: Cyprinodontidae
- Genus: Pseudorestias; Arratia, Vila, Lam, Guerrero & Quezada-Romegialli, 2017
- Species: P. lirimensis

Binomial name
- Pseudorestias lirimensis Arratia, Vila, Lam, Guerrero & Quezada-Romegialli, 2017

Genus of fishes

Pseudorestias is a monospecific genus in the family Cyprinodontidae, the pupfishes. The only species in the genus is Pseudorestias lirimensis which was described in 2017. from a type locality given as "Charvinto Creek near to the thermal pond Baños San Andrés about 6 km E of Lirima village, Chancacolla River, Tarapacá Region, northern Chile". It was also found in the Chancacolla River.
