= Orestias elegans (fish) =

Conservation status
- Endangered (IUCN 3.1)

Scientific classification
- Kingdom: Animalia
- Phylum: Chordata
- Class: Actinopterygii
- Order: Cyprinodontiformes
- Family: Cyprinodontidae
- Genus: Orestias
- Species: O. elegans

Binomial name
- Orestias elegans Garman, 1895

Species of fish

Orestias elegans is a species of pupfish from the family Cyprinodontidae. The type locality are small lakes among headwaters of Río Rimac, in Peru. It is part of the agassii species complex.
