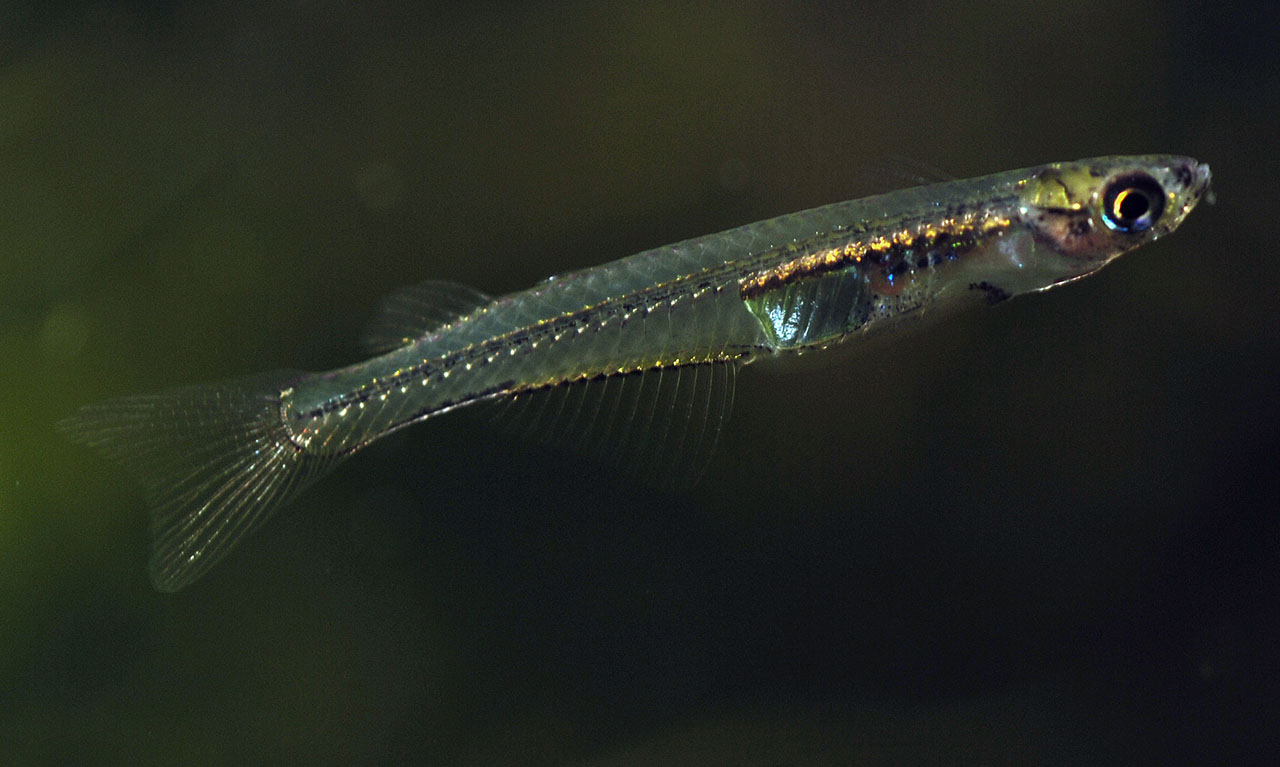
- Neostethus lankesteri

Scientific classification
- Kingdom: Animalia
- Phylum: Chordata
- Class: Actinopterygii
- Order: Atheriniformes
- Family: Phallostethidae
- Subfamily: Phallostethinae; Regan, 1916

= Phallostethinae =

Subfamily of fishes

Phallostethinae is a subfamily of fishes, one of two subfamilies in the family Phallostethidae, the priapiumfishes. The species in this subfamily are characterised mainly by having highly protrusible jaws. The genus Neostethus appears to be the sister taxon to the other two genera in the subfamily. The species in the Phallostethinae are found in south-east Asia, the Malay Archipelago and the Philippines.

== Genera ==
The following three genera are classified in the subfamily Phallostethinae:

- Neostethus Regan, 1916
- Phallostethus Regan, 1913
- Phenacostethus Myers, 1928
