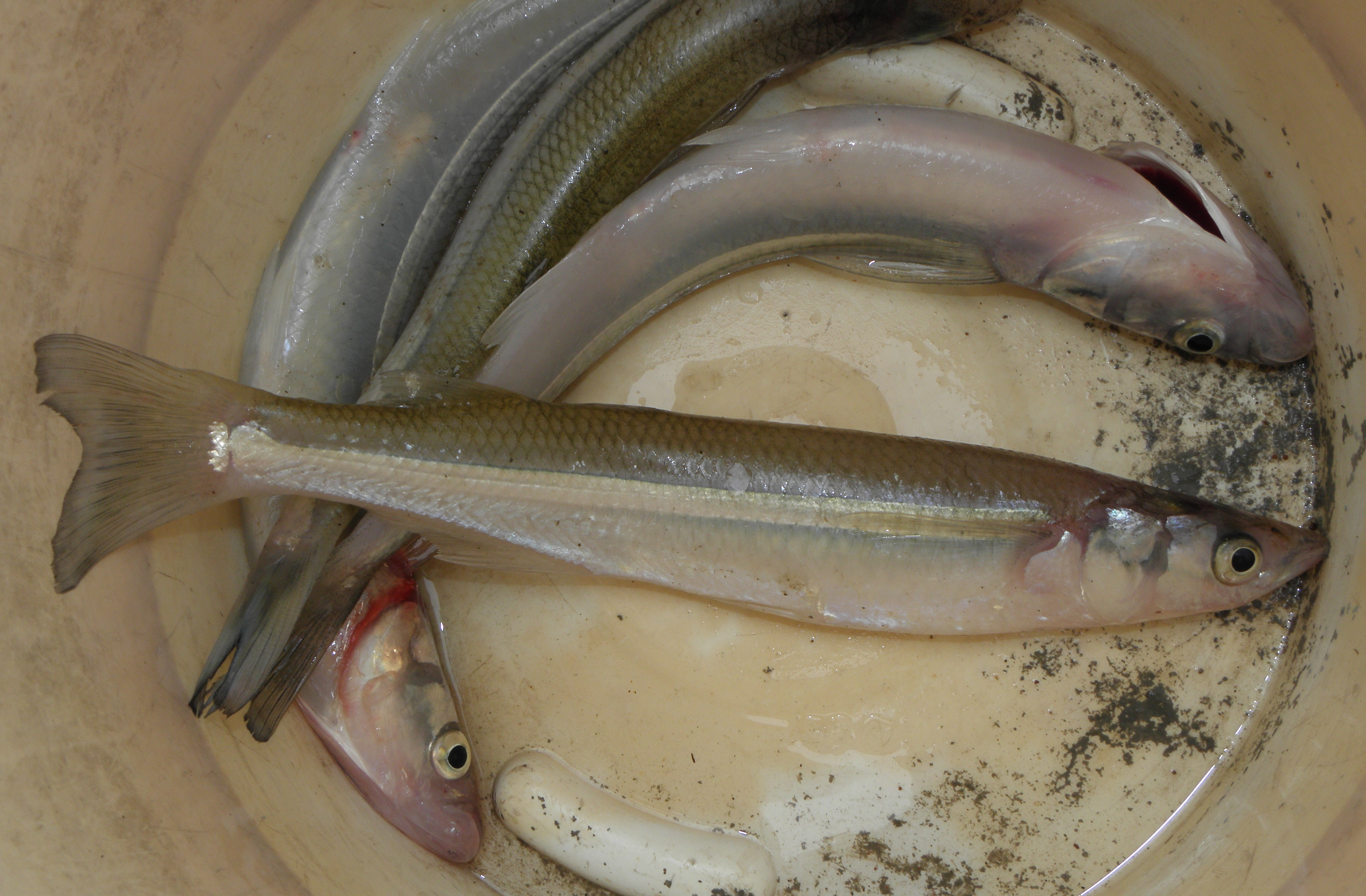

Conservation status
- Data Deficient (IUCN 3.1)

Scientific classification
- Kingdom: Animalia
- Phylum: Chordata
- Class: Actinopterygii
- Division: Teleostei
- Order: Atheriniformes
- Family: Atherinopsidae
- Genus: Odontesthes
- Species: O. bonariensis

Binomial name
- Odontesthes bonariensis (Valenciennes, 1835)

Synonyms
- Atherina bonariensis Valenciennes, 1835; Basilichthys bonariensis (Valenciennes, 1835); Atherina lichtensteinii Valenciennes, 1835; Basilichthys chascomunensis Lahille, 1929; Basilichthys puntanus Lahille, 1929

= Odontesthes bonariensis =

Species of fish

Odontesthes bonariensis is a species of Neotropical silverside, an euryhaline fish native to fresh, brackish and salt water in south-central and southeastern South America, but also introduced elsewhere. It is often known by the common name Argentinian silverside or Pejerrey (the latter is of Spanish origin, meaning "king fish," the Latin piscis given rise to "pez," fish, and "peje," a kind of fish, and "rey," king), but it is not the only species of silverside in Uruguay and Argentina and pejerrey is also used for many other silversides. It is a commercially important species and the target of major fisheries.

O. bonariensis resembles the other species in the genus Odontesthes, but it is larger, generally reaching up to 50 cm (1.6 ft) in total length, and exceptionally as much as 82 cm (2.7 ft) long and 5.2 kg (11 lb 7 oz) in weight (reports of even larger are unconfirmed and questionable).

== Range, habitat and status ==
Odontesthes bonariensis is native to subtropical and temperate South America east of the Andes where it ranges from around the Río Negro basin in Argentina, north throughout most of the northern half of that country, to the Río de la Plata Basin in south Brazil, Paraguay and Uruguay. In coastal Atlantic parts of South America it ranges at least from the southernmost Buenos Aires Province in Argentina to Rio Grande do Sul State (Lagoa dos Patos) in Brazil. It has been introduced to many places outside its native range, including Argentina (in parts of the country where not native), Bolivia, Brazil (in parts of the country where not native), Chile, Peru, Morocco (where probably not established), Italy (only Lake Nemi), Israel (failed to become established) and Japan.

O. bonariensis is highly adaptable and can live in a wide range of habitats. This includes both stagnant and flowing waters, such as rivers, streams, channels, lakes, reservoirs, estuaries and coastal lagoons. In much of its range it is particularly common in Pampas lakes that generally are less than 4 m (13 ft) deep. The species is able to live in fresh, brackish and salt water (salinity up to 3.5%), but not in hypersaline conditions. The water temperature can range at least from 7 to 30 °C (45–86 °F); in short periods they can even survive in waters where the surface has frozen. Temperatures of 32 °C (90 °F) are lethal to most individuals, and when above 25 °C (77 °F) they often perish due to increases of the parasitic Lernaea copepods (also a primary reason for failed introduction attempts of O. bonariensis in some countries), the bacteria Aeromonas hydrophila and algal blooms.

Overall the species is widespread and common, but global warming can increase the temperature and salinity in some placed inhabited by O. bonariensis, representing a threat to these local populations.

== Behavior ==
=== Breeding ===
The growth rate of O. bonariensis is quite fast: They are typically around 14 cm (5.5 in) long when one year old, 24 cm (9.5 in) when two, 35 cm (14 in) when three, 43 cm (17 in) when four and 50 cm (20 in) when five years. They first reach maturity when 1–2 years old. Males are mature from a length of about 10.5 cm (4.1 in) and females from about 19.5 cm (7.7 in). Most females spawn in March and April, but a smaller number also spawn from August to November (occasionally December) when the water temperatures typically is between 13 and 21 °C (55–70 °F). Even short periods where the water is more than 23 °C (73 °F) during the spawning season can prevent the adults from breeding. Some females that spawn in August–September may spawn a second time in the same season in October–December. In theory, a female has the potential to spawn at least five times during her life. In each spawning a female can typically lay more than 10,000 eggs, but the full range reported in the species is from 1,170 to 30,300 eggs, with large and old females producing more than smaller and younger. The eggs are laid in shallow water in clusters attached to submerged macrophytes. The eggs hatch into fish larvae after around 13–14 days. The growth of the larvae is negligible at temperatures of 15 °C (59 °F) or less, and they die at 29 °C (84 °F). As known from some other Neotropical silversides, the temperature determines the sex in O. bonariensis. When the larvae and juveniles grow up in water that is 19 °C (66 °F) or colder, all become females. At higher temperatures the percentage of males gradually increases, and at 23 °C (73 °F) or warmer most become males. The larvae are unable to survive salinities of 3% (they thrive from 2% to pure fresh water), but they can already live at this relatively high range once they reach the juvenile stage.

Hybridization with other species in the genus Odontesthes has occurred both in captivity and the wild.

=== Feeding ===
In the first part of their life O. bonariensis mostly feed on zooplankton. When reaching around 10 cm (4 in) long they start to mainly feed on insects; both aquatic insect larvae and land insects that fall into the water. From an age of around 4 years they become more piscivorous, even cannibalising young of their own species. Other food items recorded in lower quantities are shrimp, snails and plants (algae and seeds). In captivity they will eat commercially available dry pellets developed for feeding trout.

== Fishing and as an invasive species ==
This species is considered an excellent food fish, and it is of major economic importance in both its native range and where introduced. Many thousand tonnes are caught each year. It is also considered a good game fish. It is sometimes kept in aquaculture due to its ability to live in a wide range of environments, the ease of breeding it in captivity and its fast growth. In Lake Titicaca where introduced they are typically caught when around 20 cm (8 in) long and 100 g (3.5 oz) in weight, but those caught in its native Argentina typically are around 27 cm (11 in) long and weigh 300 g (11 oz). However, some populations, notably the one in Lake Titicaca, contain levels of metals from pollution that exceed the internationally recommended safety thresholds for human consumption.

Although it has significantly aided the local economy in many places where introduced, it has become invasive in some places, causing serious problems to the native species. It is one of the causes of the major declines in Orestias pupfish and Trichomycterus catfish in Bolivia, Peru (notably Lake Titicaca where O. cuvieri has become extinct and relatives declined) and Chile. Another vulnerable habitat where it has been introduced is the Iguazu River at the Argentina–Brazil border. Odontesthes hatcheri replaces O. bonariensis in the southern half of Argentina (roughly equalling Patagonia), but the latter has been translocated to certain southern regions where the two hybridize. This offspring is viable and some native populations of O. hatcheri have become "diluted".
