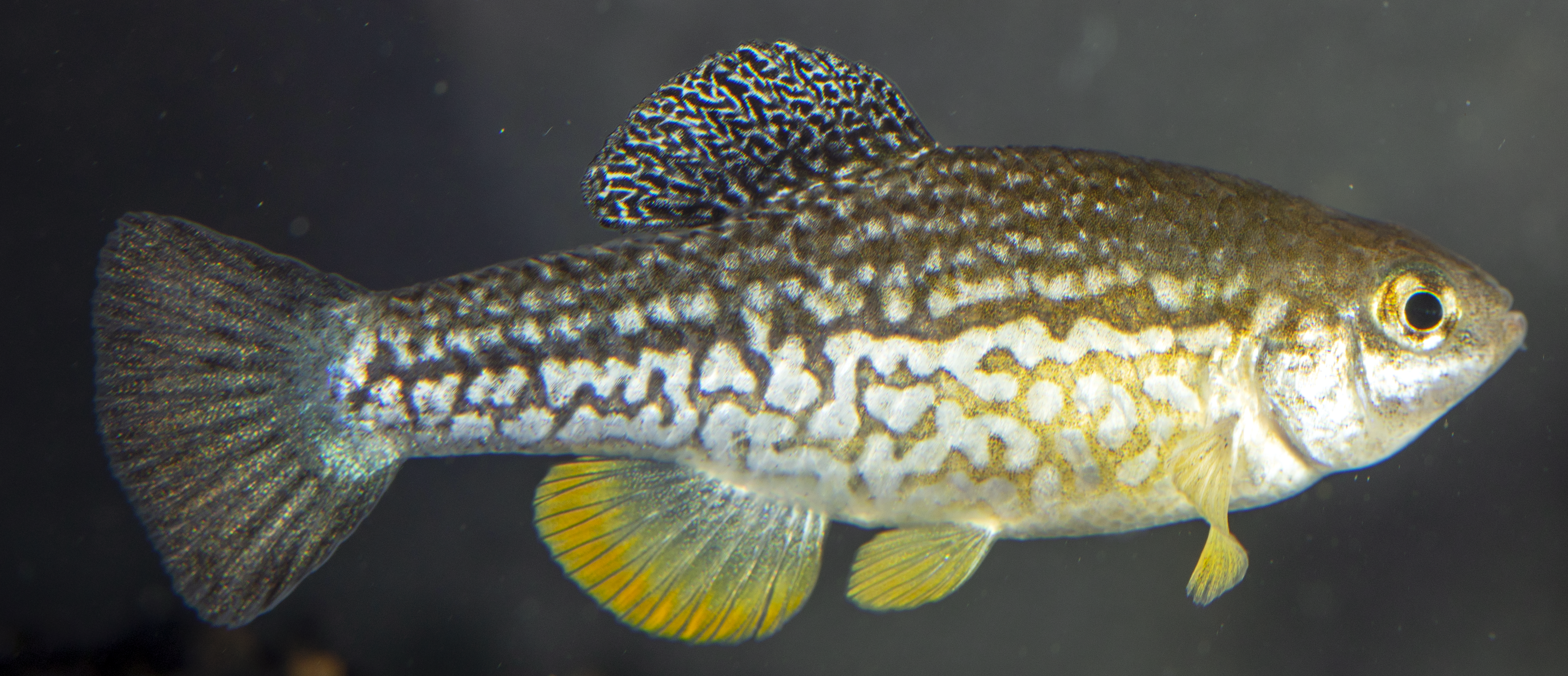
- A male captive-bred Cualac tessellatus

Conservation status
- Vulnerable (IUCN 3.1)

Scientific classification
- Kingdom: Animalia
- Phylum: Chordata
- Class: Actinopterygii
- Order: Cyprinodontiformes
- Family: Cyprinodontidae
- Genus: Cualac; Miller, 1956
- Species: C. tessellatus

Binomial name
- Cualac tessellatus R. R. Miller, 1956

= Checkered pupfish =

Species of fish

The checkered pupfish (Cualac tessellatus) is a species of pupfish endemic to San Luis Potosí in Mexico where it is restricted to the Río Verde and associated waters, including the Media Luna lake (all part of the Pánuco River basin). This species grows to a total length of 8 cm (3.1 in). It is the only known member of its genus.
