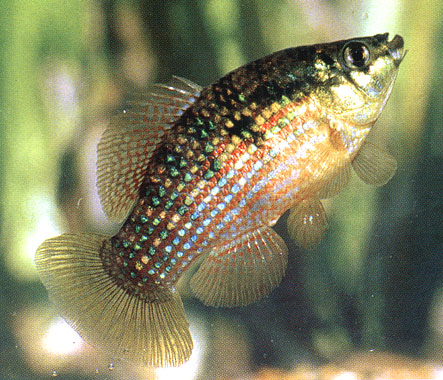

Conservation status
- Secure (NatureServe)

Scientific classification
- Kingdom: Animalia
- Phylum: Chordata
- Class: Actinopterygii
- Order: Cyprinodontiformes
- Family: Cyprinodontidae
- Genus: Jordanella; Goode & T. H. Bean, 1879
- Species: J. floridae

Binomial name
- Jordanella floridae Goode & T. H. Bean, 1879

Synonyms
- Cyprinodon floridae (Goode & T.H. Bean, 1879)

= Flagfish =

Species of fish

The flagfish (Jordanella floridae), also known as the American flagfish or Florida flagfish, is a species of pupfish, a type of killifish from the family Cyprinodontidae which is endemic to Florida. It is found in the aquarium trade. Its common name derives from the dominant males' body pattern, which bears some resemblance to the flag of the United States.

== Description ==
A male in an aquarium

Flagfish are small, robust fish, 6 centimetres (2.4 in) in length, with a truncated snout which has been compared to that of a bulldog. They have rounded fins with the dorsal and anal fins positioned posteriorly and adjoining the caudal fin. Females have an obvious spot on their flanks and a clear spot near the posterior end of the dorsal fin, this has an opaque white margin. The fins may show a slight reddish color but this comes and goes in any individual but the reason for this is unknown. The females body is mainly olive but marked with turquoise scales. The common name of the flagfish is derived from the male due to the resemblance of its patterning to the flag of the United States. There is a dark rectangle on the shoulder which is imagined as the blue and white stars in the corner of the US flag and there are stripes along the flanks, some of which are red and others paler, albeit greenish rather than white. The male also has a dark spot positioned at the lower posterior corner of the dark rectangle. The olive-grey coloration and pattern of nondominant males, females, and juveniles underlies the more colorful pattern of the dominant males.

== Distribution ==
The flagfish is endemic to Florida where it is found in the Florida Peninsula south of the drainage basins of the St. Johns River and Ochlockonee River.

== Habitat and biology ==
The flagfish normally occurs in shallow, well vegetated freshwater habitats such as backwaters, marshes, canals and ditches but it has occasionally been recorded in slightly brackish water. The flagfish is listed in the Guinness Book of World Records as the species of fish which lays the fewest eggs, a female will lay 20 eggs over a period of a few days. They have a courtship display in which the female encourages the male to chase her by nipping him. After that they face each other with the female swimming backwards, the male then backflips. After the eggs are laid the male guards them, attacking fish which stray too close. However, the male may also eat his own eggs or offspring. Other sources say that this species shows no parental care.

This species is omnivorous, it is a micropredator feeding on small invertebrates and zooplankton but it will also feed on algae and other plant material.

They are often used to naturally control hair algae in suitable aquariums, as they are one of the only fish to consume it in an impactful volume.

== Taxonomy and name ==
The flagfish was described by George Brown Goode and Tarleton Hoffman Bean in 1879 with the type locality given as Lake Monroe, Florida. The generic name honours the American ichthyologist David Starr Jordan (1851–1931). It is closely related to the Yucatan flagfish Garmanella pulchra which is sometimes also placed in the genus Jordanella.
