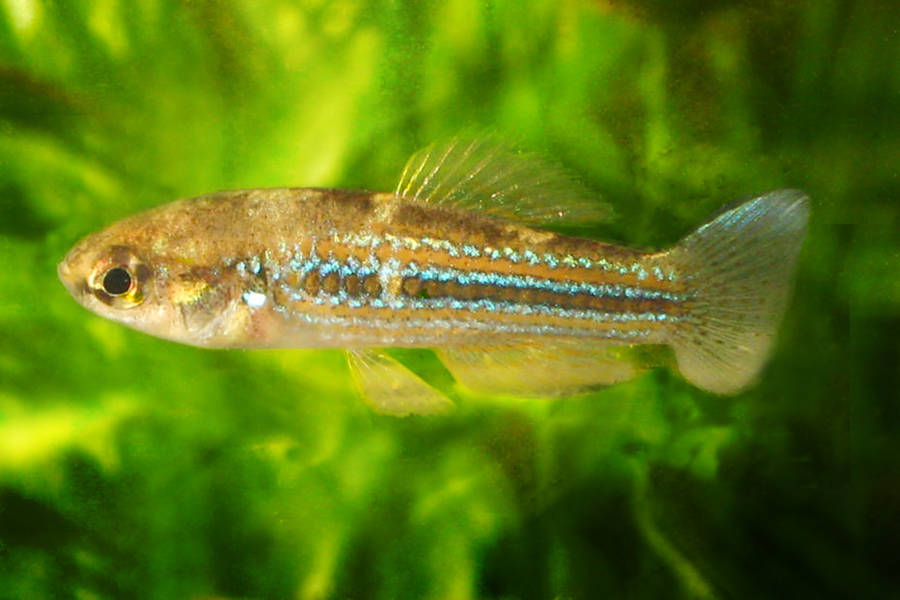

Conservation status
- Least Concern (IUCN 3.1)

Scientific classification
- Kingdom: Animalia
- Phylum: Chordata
- Class: Actinopterygii
- Order: Cyprinodontiformes
- Family: Cyprinodontidae
- Genus: Cubanichthys
- Species: C. cubensis

Binomial name
- Cubanichthys cubensis (C. H. Eigenmann, 1903)

Synonyms
- Fundulus cubensis Eigenmann, 1903

= Cubanichthys cubensis =

Species of fish

Cubanichthys cubensis, the Cuban killifish, is a species of killifish from the family Cyprinodontidae, the pupfishes which is endemic to Cuba.

== Description ==
Cubanichthys cubensis has a cylindrical body which is slightly broader and taller in the anterior portion. They are a typical size for killifish, the males are 3.6 centimetres (1.4 in) while the females are slightly smaller. They are not colourful, the body being a mottled semi-transparent golden buff with a creamy white patch which starts behind the gill covers and forms an diagonal arch which reaches the anal fin and which covers the viscera. A series of horizontal light blue lines start at the gill covers and extend along the body to the caudal peduncle. There is a broken dark line which frequently runs from the lower mandible through the middle of the eye, and proceeding to the upper part of the gill cover. The males are brighter and the blue lines are more obvious, continuing on to the bases of both the dorsal and anal fins. Like other pupfish this species is sexually dimorphic and the males have more extravagant fins than the females with added extensions on the anal and dorsal fins while their tail can be washed with blue. The females are plainer and often display mottling or splotching along the centre line of the body.

== Distribution ==
Cubanichthys cubensis is endemic species to Cuba where it is predominantly found in the western part of the island becoming more localised in the central parts. It has been found as far east as the municipality of Moron, Cuba in Ciego de Avila.

== Habitat and biology ==
Cubanichthys cubensis prefers fresh water but can infrequently be found in brackish water. They strongly prefer waters with thick vegetation consisting of macrophytes or algae plants and where they show a preference for open sunny areas. The spawning period lasts for several days during which the females can lay up to 10 eggs a day, laying each egg individually and placing them on a plant. The eggs are relatively large in size, measuring 1.4 mm in diameter, transparent and adhesive. Sometimes a female will be seen with some eggs hanging from her urogenital papillae but she soon rubs the eggs off onto water plants. It has been described as larvivorous and a large part of this species' diet consists of the larvae of mosquitoes.

== Formal description ==
Cubanichthys cubensis is the type species of the genus Cubanichthys. It was originally described in 1903 as Fundulus cubensis by Carl H. Eigenmann with the type locality being cited as Pinar del Rio, Cuba.
