= Yucatan flagfish =

Conservation status
- Least Concern (IUCN 3.1)

Scientific classification
- Kingdom: Animalia
- Phylum: Chordata
- Class: Actinopterygii
- Order: Cyprinodontiformes
- Family: Cyprinodontidae
- Genus: Garmanella; C. L. Hubbs, 1936
- Species: G. pulchra

Binomial name
- Garmanella pulchra C. L. Hubbs, 1936

Synonyms
- Jordanella pulchra (Hubbs, 1936)

Species of fish

The Yucatan flagfish (Garmanella pulchra), also known as the snakeskin killifish, is a species of pupfish from the family Cyprinodontidae. It is found in the coastal waters (both fresh and brackish) of the Yucatan Peninsula, in Mexico and Belize. This species grows to a length of 4 centimetres (1.6 in) TL and is found in the aquarium trade. This species was described by Carl Leavitt Hubbs in 1936 with the type locality given as 5 kilometres (3.1 mi) east of Progreso, Yucatán, Mexico. It is the only known member of its genus. The name of the genus commemorates the American ichthyologist Samuel Garman (1843-1927) who was working on a revision of his 1895 monograph on the Cyprinodontidae at the time of his death. It is sometimes treated as a junior synonym of Jordanella.

The Yucatan flagfish is found in coastal brackish water systems and inland freshwaters with hard water over substrates of marl, sand, decomposing vegetation, rocks and mud. It is mainly herbivorous, its diet largely being made up of microalgae, but it also eats small invertebrates such as ostracods, tanaidacea, and amphipods.
