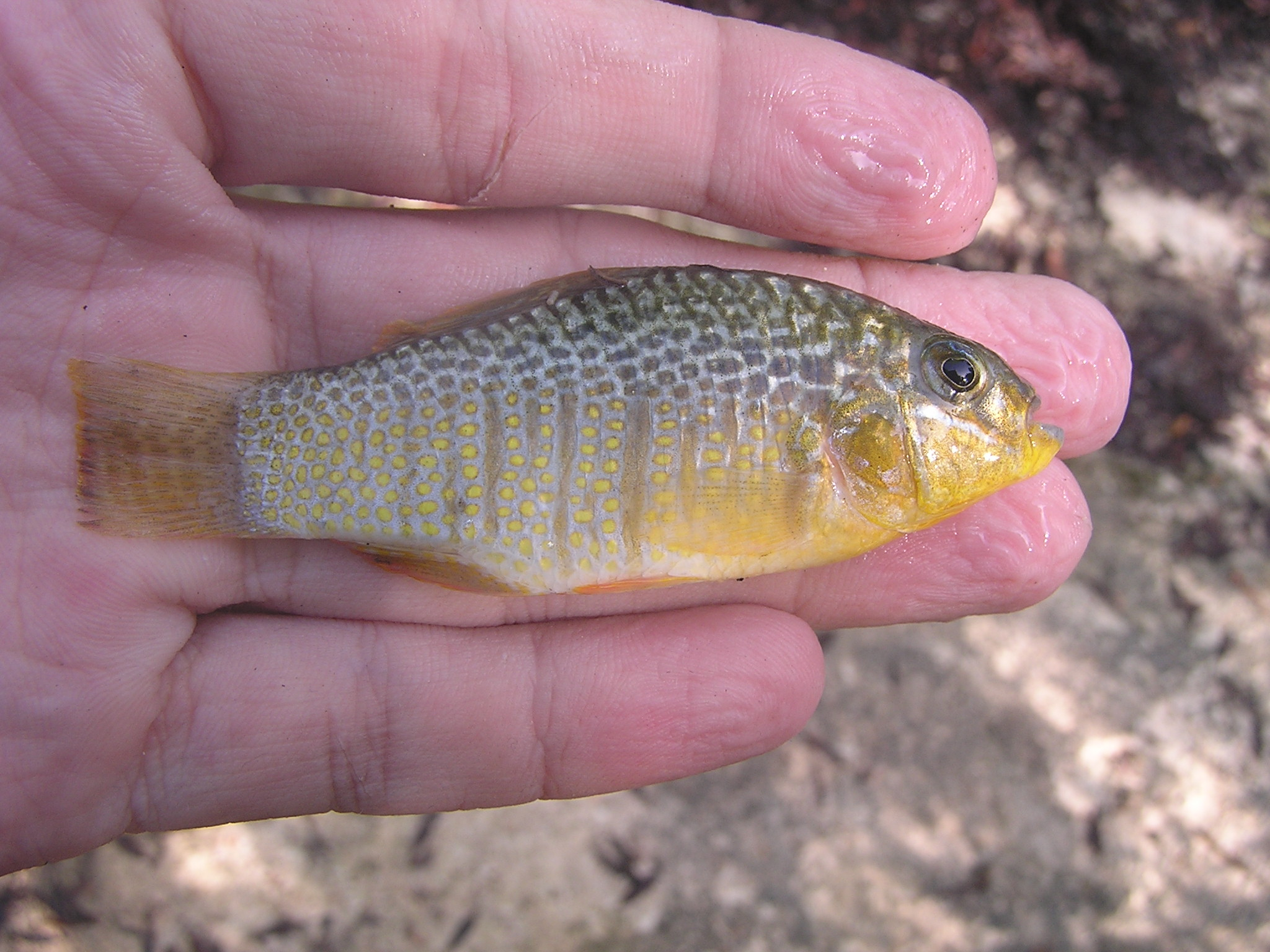
- Floridichthys polyommus at Laguna Bacalar, Mexico

Scientific classification
- Kingdom: Animalia
- Phylum: Chordata
- Class: Actinopterygii
- Division: Teleostei
- Order: Cyprinodontiformes
- Family: Cyprinodontidae
- Genus: Floridichthys; C. L. Hubbs, 1926

Type species
- Cyprinodon carpio Günther, 1866

= Floridichthys =

Genus of fishes

Floridichthys is a genus of pupfishes native to the southeastern United States, Mexico and northern Central America. The name of this genus is a compound of Florida and the Greek for "fish", ichthys. The ichthyologist Carl Leavitt Hubbs thought that the genus was confined to Florida at the time he coined the name.

== Species ==
There are currently two recognized species in this genus:

- Floridichthys carpio (Günther, 1866) (Goldspotted killifish)
- Floridichthys polyommus C. L. Hubbs, 1936 (Ocellated killifish)
