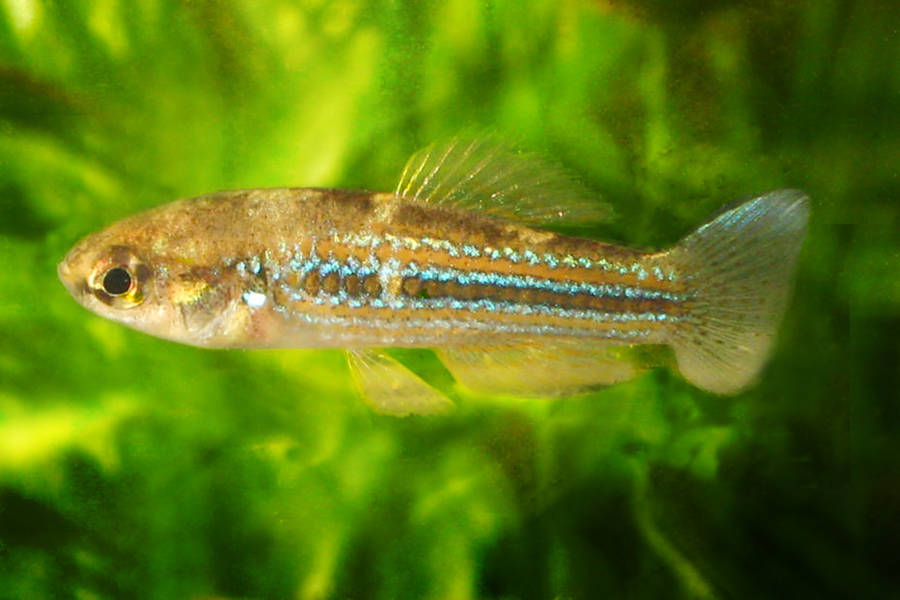
- Cuban killifish (C. cubensis)

Scientific classification
- Kingdom: Animalia
- Phylum: Chordata
- Class: Actinopterygii
- Order: Cyprinodontiformes
- Family: Cyprinodontidae
- Genus: Cubanichthys; C. L. Hubbs, 1926

Type species
- Fundulus cubensis C. H. Eigenmann, 1903

= Cubanichthys =

Genus of fishes

Cubanichthys is a small genus of pupfishes endemic to the Caribbean Islands of Cuba and Jamaica. The name of this genus is a compound of Cuba, where the genus was thought to be endemic until C. pengellyi was placed in the genus, and the Greek word for fish, ichthys.

== Species ==
There are currently two recognized species in this genus:

- Cubanichthys cubensis (C. H. Eigenmann, 1903) (Cuban killifish)
- Cubanichthys pengelleyi (Fowler, 1939) (Jamaican killifish)
