= Vladimir V. Tchernavin =

Russian scientist and political prisoner (1887–1949)

- Чернавин Владимир Вячеславович
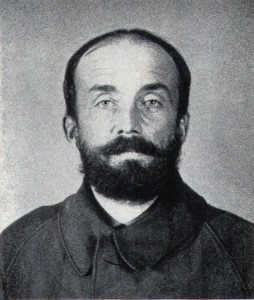
- Vladimir Vyacheslavovich Tchernavin
- Born: 1887; Tsarskoye Selo, Russia
- Died: 1949 (aged 61–62); Kensington, United Kingdom
- Spouse: Tatiana Tchernavin

Vladimir Vyacheslavovich Tchernavin (alternative transliteration: Chernavin) (Russian: Владимир Вячеславович Чернавин) (1887– 31 March 1949) was a Russian-born ichthyologist who became famous as one of the first and few prisoners of the Soviet Gulag system to escape abroad.

== Background ==
Tchernavin was born in 1887 in Tsarskoye Selo, near St. Petersburg, Russian Empire, into a noble family of modest means. After his father died in 1902 he participated in expeditions to the Altai region with the Russian explorer Vasili Sapozhnikov in order to study the local fauna. Later he became the leader of a series of scientific expeditions to the Altai Mountain and Sayanskii Mountain, Mongolia, the Tian Shan Mountains, the Amur River region, and the Ussuriysk region on the Siberian-Manchurian border, and to Lapland.

From 1912 to 1917, Tchernavin studied at St. Petersburg University but his studies were interrupted by the First World War. He was conscripted and served in the army, but was wounded and medically discharged in 1915. He resumed his studies at the renamed Petrograd University, and graduated in 1916.

== Career ==
Food shortages were very severe in Russian cities at this time, and Tchernavin took a lecturing post at the Petrograd Agronomical Institute in order to obtain the daily issue of milk from the Institute's herd to members of staff, for his infant son. Here he completed a thesis and obtained an advanced degree.

From 1923, he was Professor of Ichthyology at the Institute, and from 1926 he moved to Murmansk as Director of Production and Research Work of the Northern Fisheries Trust, the State-owned industry, which had been set up to deal with the fishing sector in the region along the Arctic Ocean. He stepped down from his position in the management of production in 1928, in order to concentrate on research work. His main academic research to this point had been the study of skeletal development and re-development in salmon species, and its application to systematics and evolution: these publications were not available outside the USSR in his lifetime.

His family remained in Leningrad (Saint-Petersburg), where Tatiana worked as curator in the Section of Applied Arts of the Hermitage. In 1930 some of his colleagues were arrested by the Soviet secret police, the Gosudarstvennoye Politicheskoye Upravlenie (State Political Directorate) or "GPU." He was also questioned by GPU officers. While on a visit to Moscow, 48 leading figures and intellectuals in charge of Russia's state food industry were convicted in show trials and executed for 'wrecking' activities. A number of the executed persons were personal friends and colleagues of Tchernavin.

=== Arrest and conviction ===
He then decided not to return to Murmansk but to join his family in Leningrad. Here he was arrested at his home and his apartment was searched. He was imprisoned in the Shpalernaya prison in Leningrad. He was interrogated and threatened with execution should he refuse to confess. To put more pressure on him, the GPU also arrested his wife in January 1931. He refused to confess in the knowledge that a confession would mean certain death. He was later moved to the Kresty prison.

On 25 April 1931, Tchernavin was convicted for "wrecking" under Article 58, Paragraph 7 of the Soviet Penal Code and was sentenced to 5 years of Gulag labor camps. He was able to have a brief meeting with his son before his transport to the camps.

=== Gulag life ===
He was put on a prison transport to the Solovetsky labor camp on 2 May 1931. Initially having to perform hard labor with the other inmates, such as loading logs, he was subsequently transferred to the camp of Kem where he worked as an ichthyologist in the Fishery Department of the camp. Here he started making preparations for his escape. Tchernavin then learned that his wife had been released from prison.

He was able to arrange that as part of his prison work, he could travel extensively throughout the Kem district without an escort in order to set up new fishing points and study the possibility of using fish for animal feed. He used these travels to make further preparations for his family's escape. He had his first meeting with his wife and son in November 1931 since his arrest and show trial.

For a while he was "rented" by the prison authorities as a lecturer, and worked in an advisory role training managers of collective fish farms. The better treatment that he received during this period allowed him to remain physically healthy and fit for his planned escape.

=== Escape ===
In August 1932, his wife and son visited him again and they then set out on their escape. After 22 days of trekking through rugged terrain and suffering hardships due to a lack of provisions and poor weather, they were finally able to reach Finland. Tchernavin's son gave an account of the escape, filmed on location in the Russian arctic, in Angus MacQueen's documentary Gulag (2000).

== Life after the Gulag ==
Tchernavin's wife Tatiana began to write her account of their escape during her time spent in the hospital in the immediate aftermath of their escape; she was recovering from the adverse effects of the journey and life in the gulag, given the fact that she had a heart condition. The book was published first in London in October 1933. The Tchernavins were still living in Finland in 1933, but in April of that year, a letter from Vladimir, entitled "Methods of the OGPU" was published in The London Times. The letter was a rebuttal from his personal experience of the statement by Andrey Vyshinsky at the then current trial in Moscow of Metropolitan-Vickers engineers that '...in U.S.S.R. the accused are not put to torture...'. A subsequent letter from Sir Bernard Pares strongly suggests that Pares had helped to bring about Vladimir's publication, and in March 1934 Pares presided at Tatiana's public lecture in London, entitled "The fate of the intellectual worker in Soviet Russia".

In 1934 Tchernavin and his family moved to England, where he continued his scientific work as an ichthyologist. He worked in the Natural History Museum in London until his death. (Tatiana became a translator in the UK Ministry of Information for the remainder of World War II and helped subtitle Noël Coward's war propaganda film In Which We Serve. Andrei became a civil engineer and designed the Bow Flyover.)

== Personal life and death ==
Tchernavin married Tatiana Vasilievna Sapozhnikova (1887–1971), an arts graduate from the same university. They had one child, a son Andrei (Andrei Vladimirovich Tchernavin, 1918–2007).

Tchernavin took his own life by inhaling gas in a flat in Kensington, London, on 31 March 1949, the day after Miss Agnes Drew, a friend he had been caring for, died of an illness.

Vladimir Vyacheslavovich Chernavin was rehabilitated in the Soviet Union on October 11, 1989 by the prosecutor's office of the Murmansk region.

== Legacy ==
Tchernavin's I Speak for the Silent: Prisoners of the Soviets (1935) and his wife's book Escape From The Soviets (1934) were among the first to give testimony of life under the Soviets, the GPU's operations, and the Gulag system.

The New Masses (a literary, communist magazine in New York City) decried Tchernavin's I Speak for the Silent as a "vicious" attack on the Soviet Union by a member of the "nobility." The review stated:

Tchernavin poses as the intellectual who is above political intrigue and is anxious to do his job, but prevented by persecution as a class enemy... Under the guise of a "scientific analysis" he points out that the control figures "dictated" by the Central Planning Buro were impossible and absurd, because of the shortage of labor, skilled and unskilled, the physical handicaps, and inefficiency of party members... The rest of the book deals with Tchernavin's prison experiences and his attempts to escape. Here the scientist's mask is dropped and we enter the dime novel world... Tchernavin makes a show of scientific objectivity but essentially his is the story of a man who through class drawbacks was a misfit in a new society.

In his memoir, Whittaker Chambers cited Tchernavin's I Speak for the Silent as one of the original factors in his own decision to break from the Soviet GRU during the latter 1930s.

Five Dials literary magazine reprinted an excerpt from I Speak for the Silent in its second issue.

== Works ==
- "Methods of the OGPU," The London Times (1933)
- I Speak for the Silent: Prisoners of the Soviets (1934)
- "Notes on the chondrocranium and bronchial skeleton of Salmo," Proceedings of the Zoological Society (1938)

== See also ==
- Tatiana Tchernavin
- Gulag
- Andre Mikhelson
- Whittaker Chambers
- Anti-communism
