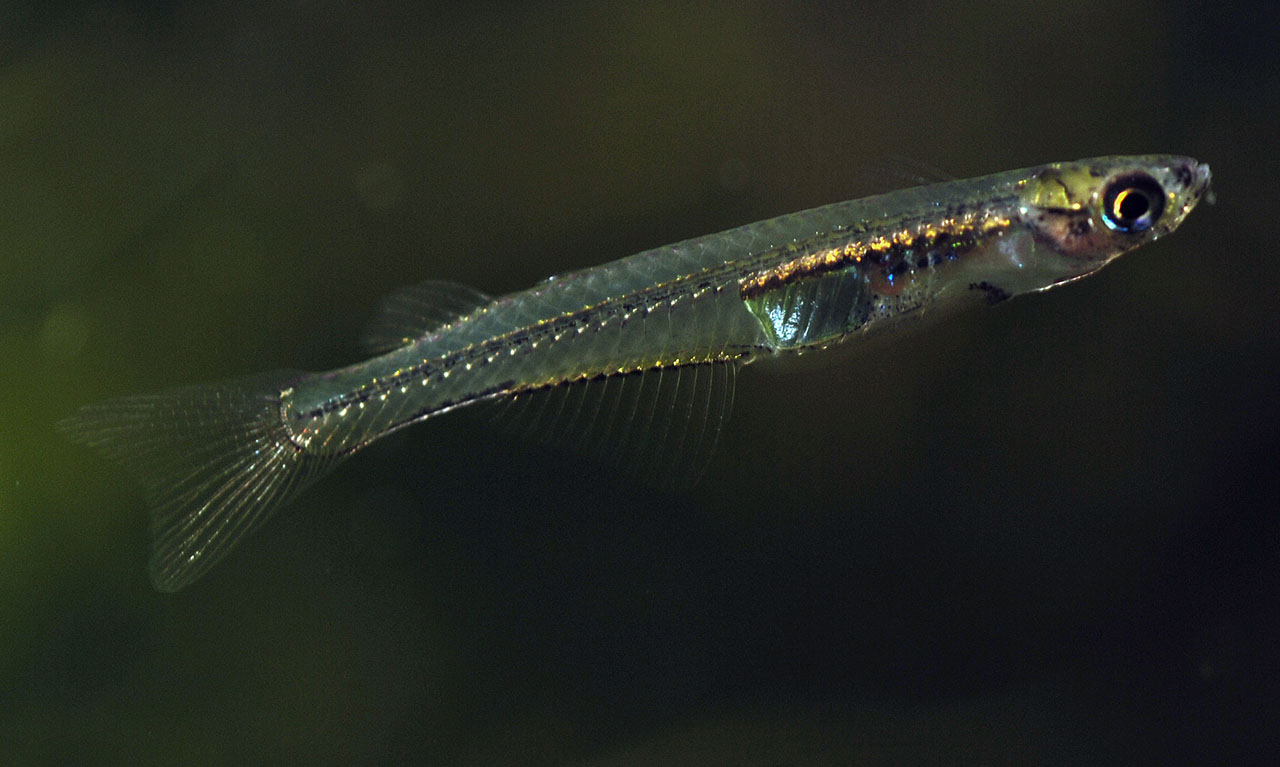
- Neostethus lankesteri

Scientific classification
- Kingdom: Animalia
- Phylum: Chordata
- Class: Actinopterygii
- Order: Atheriniformes
- Suborder: Atherinoidei
- Family: Phallostethidae; Regan, 1916

Subfamilies
- see text

= Phallostethidae =

Family of ray-finned fishes

Phallostethidae, also known as priapium fish, is a family of atheriniform fish native to freshwater and brackish habitats in southeast Asia.

They are small, no more than 3.5 cm (1.4 in) in length, with partially translucent bodies. They are found in fresh and brackish water from Thailand to the Philippines and Sulawesi. They are named for a muscular organ found under the chin of males. This organ, which may possess small testicles, is used together with the pelvic fins to grasp the female during mating. Unlike most other fish, priapium fishes exhibit internal fertilisation, although they are oviparous.

== Subdivision ==
The family Phallostethidae is divided into two subfamilies and four genera:

- Subfamily Phallostethinae Regan, 1916
  - Genus Neostethus Regan, 1916
  - Genus Phallostethus Regan, 1916
  - Genus Phenacostethus Myers, 1928
- Subfamily Gulaphallinae Aurich, 1937
  - Genus Gulaphallus Herre, 1925
