= Lynne R. Parenti =

U.S. ichthyologist

- Born: 1954 (age 71–72); Manhattan, New York
- Education: Stony Brook University; CUNY Graduate Center
- Known for: Ichthyology
- Scientific career
- Workplaces: Smithsonian Institution

Lynne R. Parenti (born 1954) is an American ichthyologist. She serves as a Research Scientist and Curator of Fishes at the National Museum of Natural History of the Smithsonian Institution. Her specialty is the systematics and historical biogeography of freshwater and coastal fishes, and she has conducted research in this area for about thirty years.

== Early life and education ==
Parenti was born in Manhattan, New York, grew up in Staten Island. She earned her B.S. in Biological Sciences from the Stony Brook University in 1975 and her Ph.D. in Biology through a joint program between the Graduate Center of the City University of New York and the American Museum of Natural History in 1980.

== Career ==
Parenti has written, spoken and conducted research in the areas of systematics, phylogeny and biogeography of tropical freshwater and coastal marine fishes, comparative teleost anatomy, development and reproduction, and theory and methods of historical biogeography. She has led expeditions in Papua New Guinea, the Malay Peninsula, Borneo, China, Taiwan, Sulawesi, Hawaii, Tasmania, and New Zealand. She has been the principal investigator of several National Science Foundation (NSF) grants. Among other work, her research has led to biological reclassification of killifish.

In 1995, Parenti became a member of the Washington Biologists’ Field Club. In 2005, she was the first woman ichthyologist to be President of the American Society of Ichthyologists and Herpetologists.

== Publications ==
Parenti has written more than 100 peer-reviewed articles published in scientific journals including Science. Many of her articles are highly cited. She has also written four books, including Cladistic Biogeography — Interpreting Patterns of Plant and Animal Distributions, for which a second edition was published in 1999. Her most recent book, Comparative Biogeography: Discovering and Classifying Biogeographical Patterns of a Dynamic Earth (2009, University of California Press), was recognized in 2010 as the Smithsonian Secretary's Research Prize Winner.

== Honors and awards ==
She is a Fellow of the American Association for the Advancement of Science, Honorary Fellow of the California Academy of Sciences, and Honorary member of the Indonesian Ichthyological Society. In 2005, she was a Distinguished Lecturer in the Petrus Artedi Tricentennial Symposium on Ichthyology.

== See also ==
- Category:Taxa named by Lynne R. Parenti
