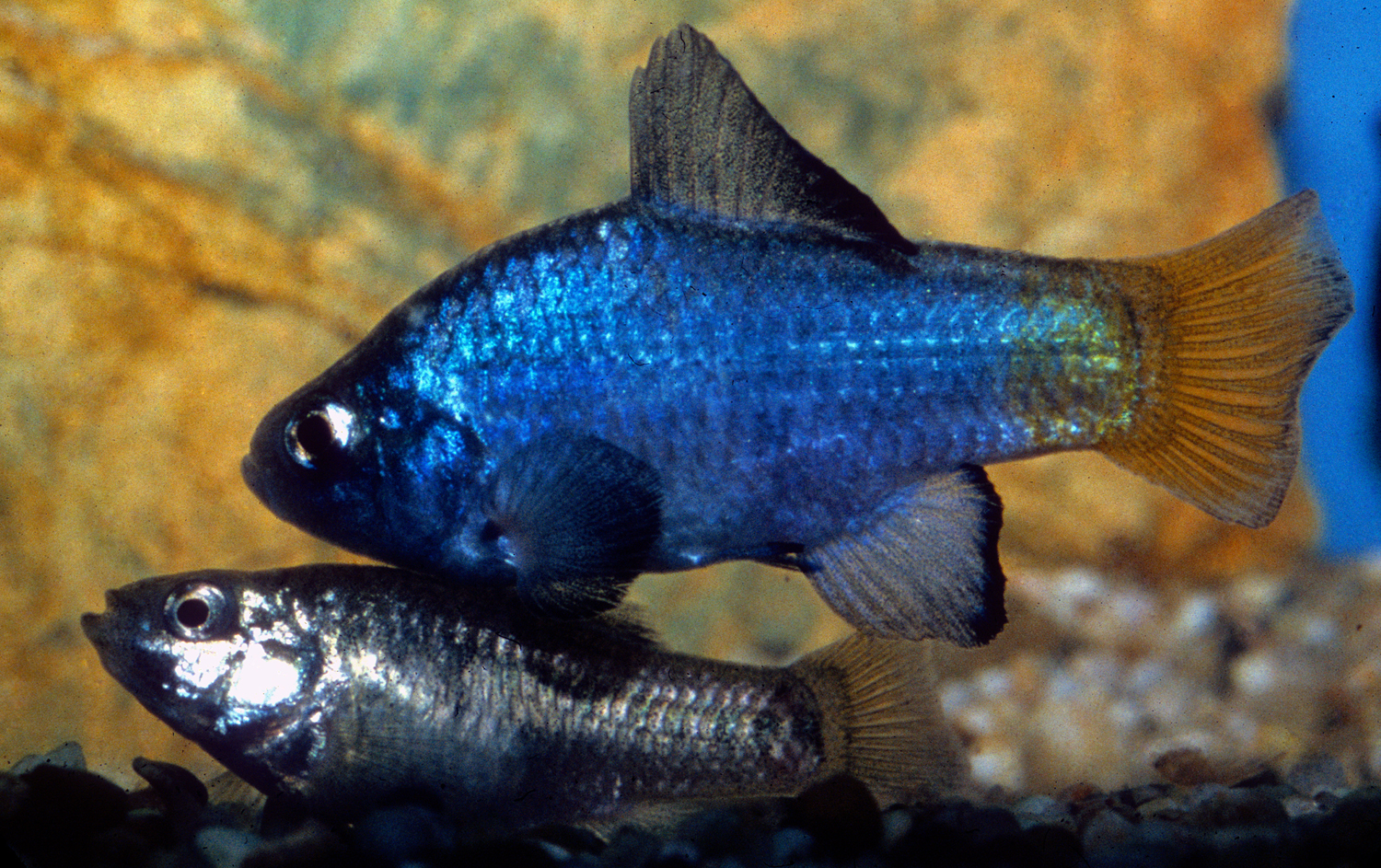
- Desert pupfish (Cyprinodon macularius)

Scientific classification
- Kingdom: Animalia
- Phylum: Chordata
- Class: Actinopterygii
- Division: Teleostei
- Order: Cyprinodontiformes
- Suborder: Cyprinodontoidei
- Family: Cyprinodontidae; T. N. Gill, 1865

Genera
- See the text

= Pupfish =

Pupfish Temporal range: Early Miocene–present

Family of fishes

Pupfish are a group of small killifish belonging to ten genera of the family Cyprinodontidae of ray-finned fish. Pupfish are especially noted for being found in extreme and isolated situations. They are primarily found in North America, South America, and the Caribbean region. As of August 2006, 120 nominal species and 9 subspecies were known. Several pupfish species are extinct and most extant species are listed. In the U.S., the most well-known pupfish species may be the Devils Hole pupfish, native to Devils Hole on the Nevada side of Death Valley National Park. Since 1995 the Devils Hole pupfish has been in a nearly steady decline, where it was close to extinction at 35–68 fish in 2013.

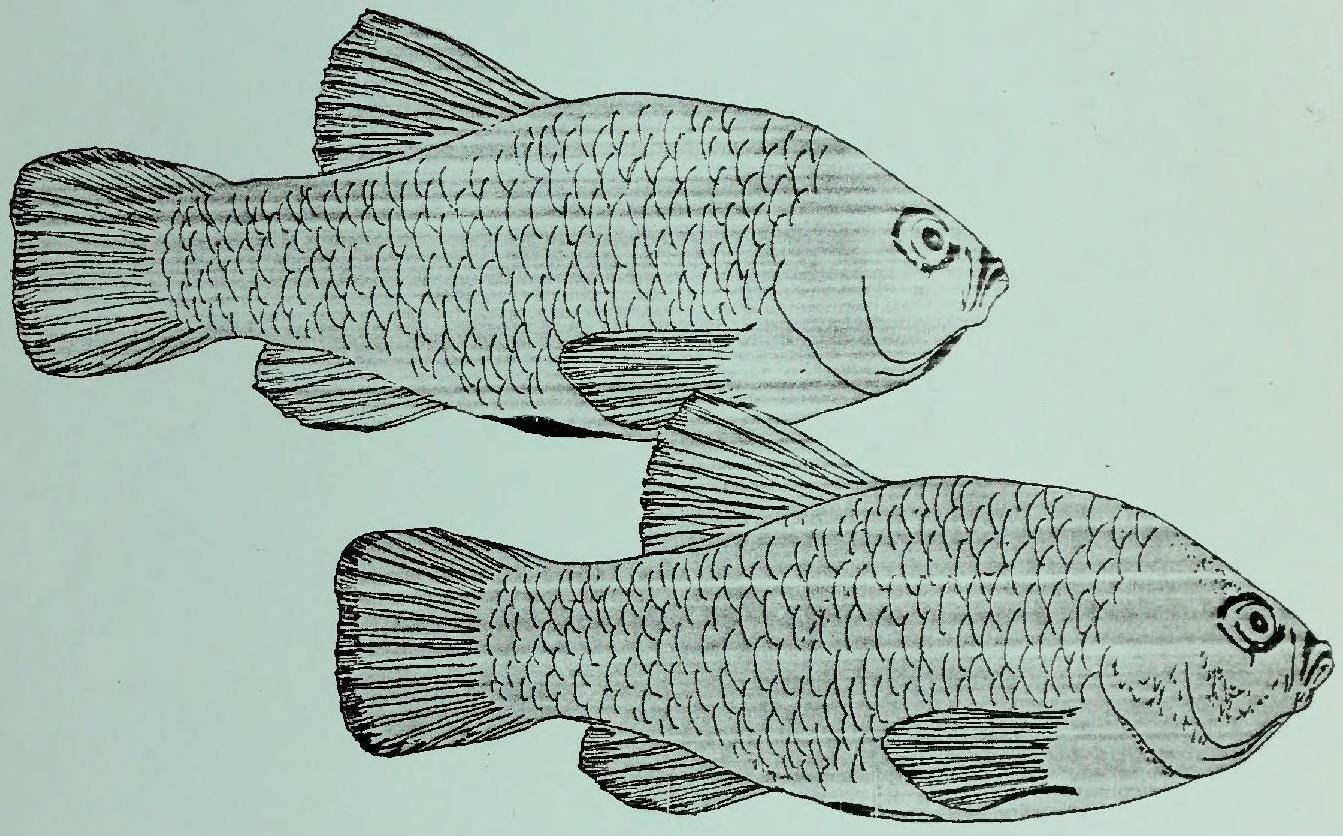
Warm Springs pupfish recovery plan art

The common name is said to derive from the mating habits of the males, whose activities vaguely resemble puppies at play; Carl L. Hubbs, a prominent ichthyologist and one of the first people to take an interest in them, coined the name after he observed their "playful" circling and tussling, which is actually the aggressive behavior of territorial males.

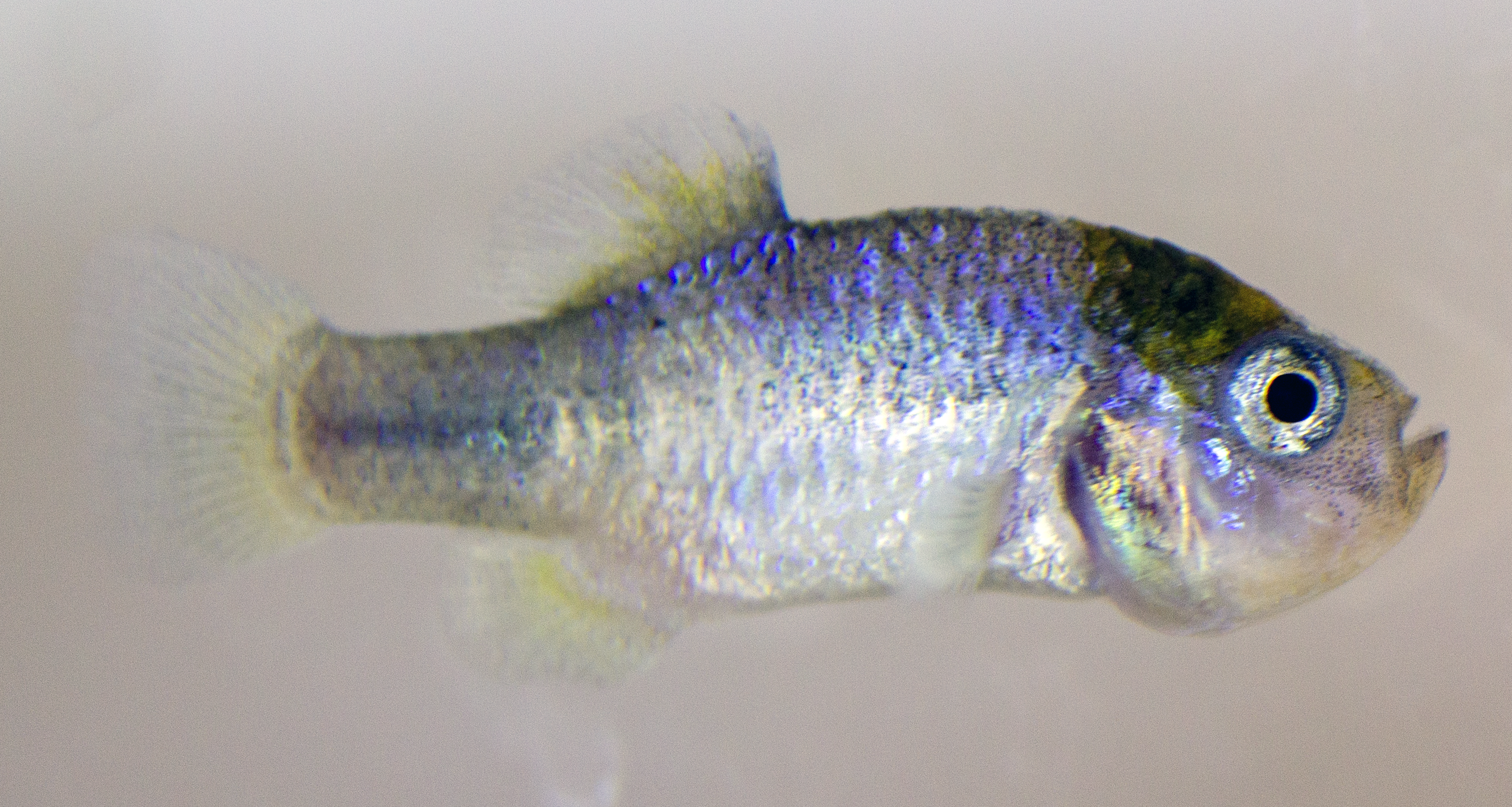
Now extinct, this was the last male Catarina pupfish (Megupsilon aporus) which died in 2014

In spite of their name, the cyprinodontids are not closely related to Cyprinidae, or carp family. They were formerly considered near allies of the pikes and their relatives, as they share some features: a flat head with protractile mouth beset with cardiform, villiform, or compressed, bi- or tricuspid teeth, generally large scales, and the absence of a well-developed lateral line. However, they are now generally assigned to the order Cyprinodontiformes. Several forms occur in the fossil records of the Oligocene and Miocene beds of Europe. Pupfish from San Salvador Island were able to diversify into multiple species with different eating habits due to interbreeding with pupfish from other islands, mainly Caribbean.

Most pupfish are inhabitants of fresh and brackish waters. Many species are ovoviviparous; often the sexes are dissimilar, the female being larger and less brilliantly coloured, with smaller fins; the anal fin of the male may be modified into an intromittent organ by means of which internal fertilization takes place. Most pupfishes' diet consists, mainly, of algae, decaying vegetation, and any insects they can get.

== Genera ==
- †Carrionellus White, 1927 (fossil; Early Miocene of Ecuador)
- Cualac Miller, 1956
- Cubanichthys C.L. Hubbs, 1926
- Cyprinodon Lacépède, 1803
- Floridichthys C.L. Hubbs, 1926
- Garmanella C.L. Hubbs, 1936
- Jordanella Goode & Bean, 1879
- †Megupsilon Miller & Walters, 1972 (extinct 2014)
- Orestias Valenciennes 1839
- Pseudorestias Arratia, Vila, Lam, Guerrero & Quezada-Romegialli, 2017
- Yssolebias Huber 2012 (possibly extinct, only known from one old specimen)

== Pupfish evolution ==
Pupfish on the island of San Salvador, Bahamas, have a large adaptive diversification in only two small lakes. They evolve 50–130 times faster than any other species of pupfish. This is also the fastest morphological diversification seen in any fish that has been documented. It is believed that this diversification is because of their ecological niches.

Three species of pupfish on the island of San Salvador, Bahamas, all live in salty lakes. These pupfish are able to take advantage of different food sources so they can all coexist. One species feeds on only the scales of other pupfish. Another has a modified jaw to be able to eat snails and ostracods.

Before the 1990s, Lake Chichancanab, in Mexico, was full of brackish water and another five species of pupfish were found there. Cyprinodon maya was the largest pupfish, and it ate other fish. Cyprinodon simus was the second smallest, and it ate zooplankton. These species are now considered extinct in the wild because of an invasive species of African tilapia.

The Death Valley pupfish evolve 5–10 faster than average and are known for their abilities to survive in extremely hot waters. Cyprinodon diabolis eat algae off a rock shelf near the surface of the deep pool they live in.

Pupfish are facultative anaerobes.

== North American pupfish ==
The pupfish found in Death Valley were once thought to be one main species. They were once all found in Lake Manly, a glacial lake over 620 square miles (1,600 km^{2}), roughly 185,000-128,000 years ago. Over time this lake dried up and started to separate into smaller lakes or ponds. As this drying happened the pupfish became separated into different ponds and started to divergently evolve. There are thought to be two main subspecies of Death Valley pupfish (C. salinus and C. milleri) present. These are both considered endangered since they are only found in one area of the world. Cyprinodon pachycephalus live in extremely hot waters, 114 °F (45.5 °C).

The Devils Hole pupfish (Cyprinodon diabolis) is a specific species native to Nevada. There are fewer than 200 individuals since 2005. Their population size usually fluctuates between 37 and 400 fish. They are considered one of the world's rarest fish. These fish live in 94 °F (34.4 °C) waters.

== See also ==
- List of fish families
- Devils Hole
- Devils Hole pupfish
- White Sands Pupfish
