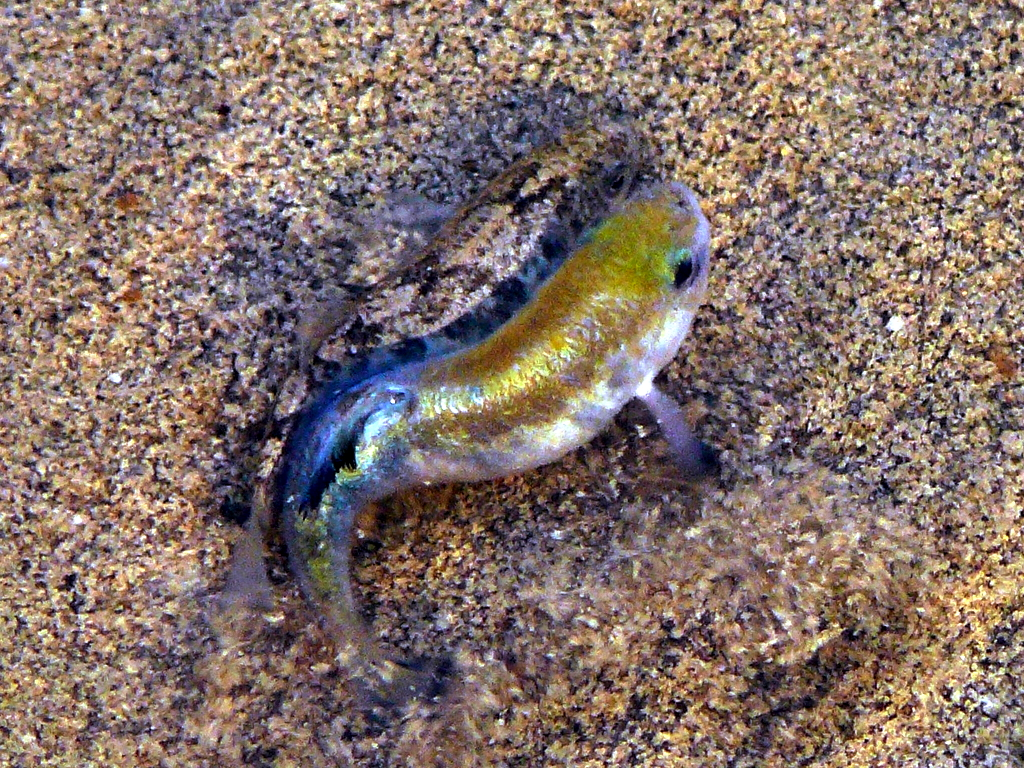
- Male (right) and female (left)

Conservation status
- Endangered (IUCN 3.1)

- Critically Imperiled (NatureServe)

Scientific classification
- Kingdom: Animalia
- Phylum: Chordata
- Class: Actinopterygii
- Division: Teleostei
- Order: Cyprinodontiformes
- Family: Cyprinodontidae
- Genus: Cyprinodon
- Species: C. salinus

Binomial name
- Cyprinodon salinus R. R. Miller, 1943

Subspecies
- C. s. salinus; C. s. milleri
- IUCN range map for Cyprinodon salinus, Version 2022-2

= Death Valley pupfish =

Small endangered fish native to Death Valley, California

The Death Valley pupfish (Cyprinodon salinus), also known as Salt Creek pupfish, is a small species of fish in the family Cyprinodontidae found only in Death Valley National Park, California, United States. There are two recognized subspecies: C. s. salinus and C. s. milleri. The Death Valley pupfish is endemic to two small, isolated locations and currently classified as endangered.

== Description ==
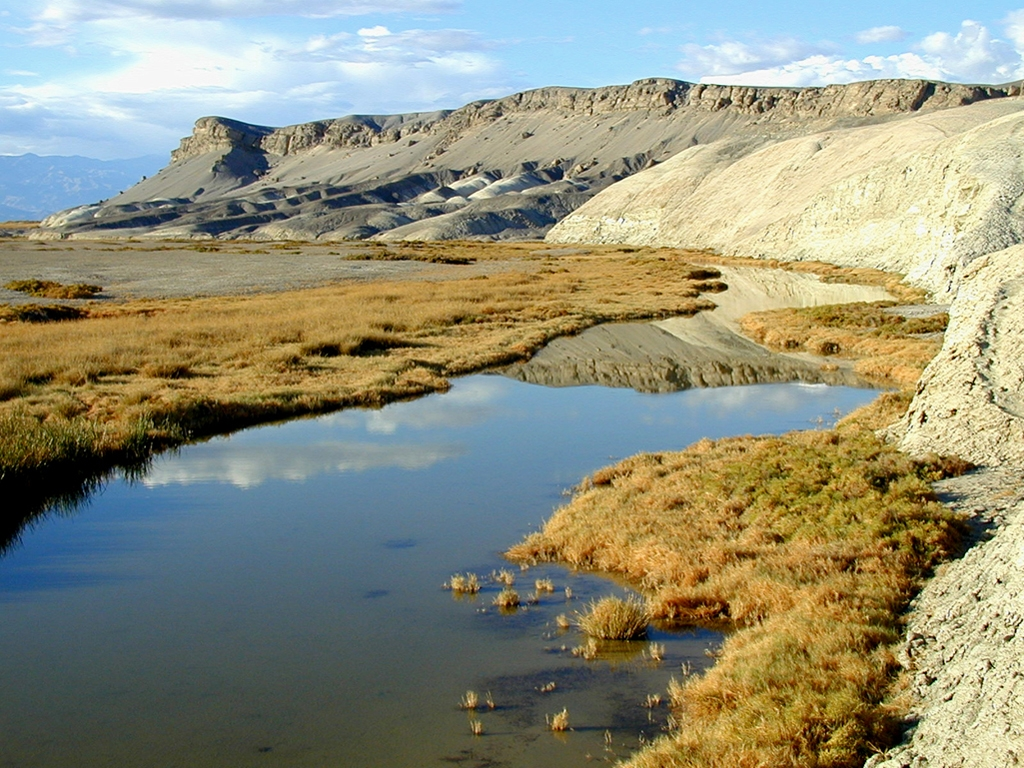
The spring-fed pools of upper Salt Creek are the year-round habitat of pupfish

The Death Valley pupfish is a small, silvery colored fish with 6–9 vertical dark bands on its sides. It has an average length of 3.7 cm (1.5 in), with a recorded maximum of 7.8 cm (3.1 in).

The males, often appearing in larger sizes compared to females, turn bright blue during mating season, April through October. The females, along with premature pupfish, tend to have tanned backs with iridescent, silvery sides. Both males and females have plump bodies with rounded fins, a squashed head and an upturned mouth. The pupfish can withstand harsh conditions that would kill other fish: water that is 4 times more saline than the ocean, hot water up to 116 °F (47 °C), and cold water down to 32 °F (0 °C).

== Distribution and habitat ==
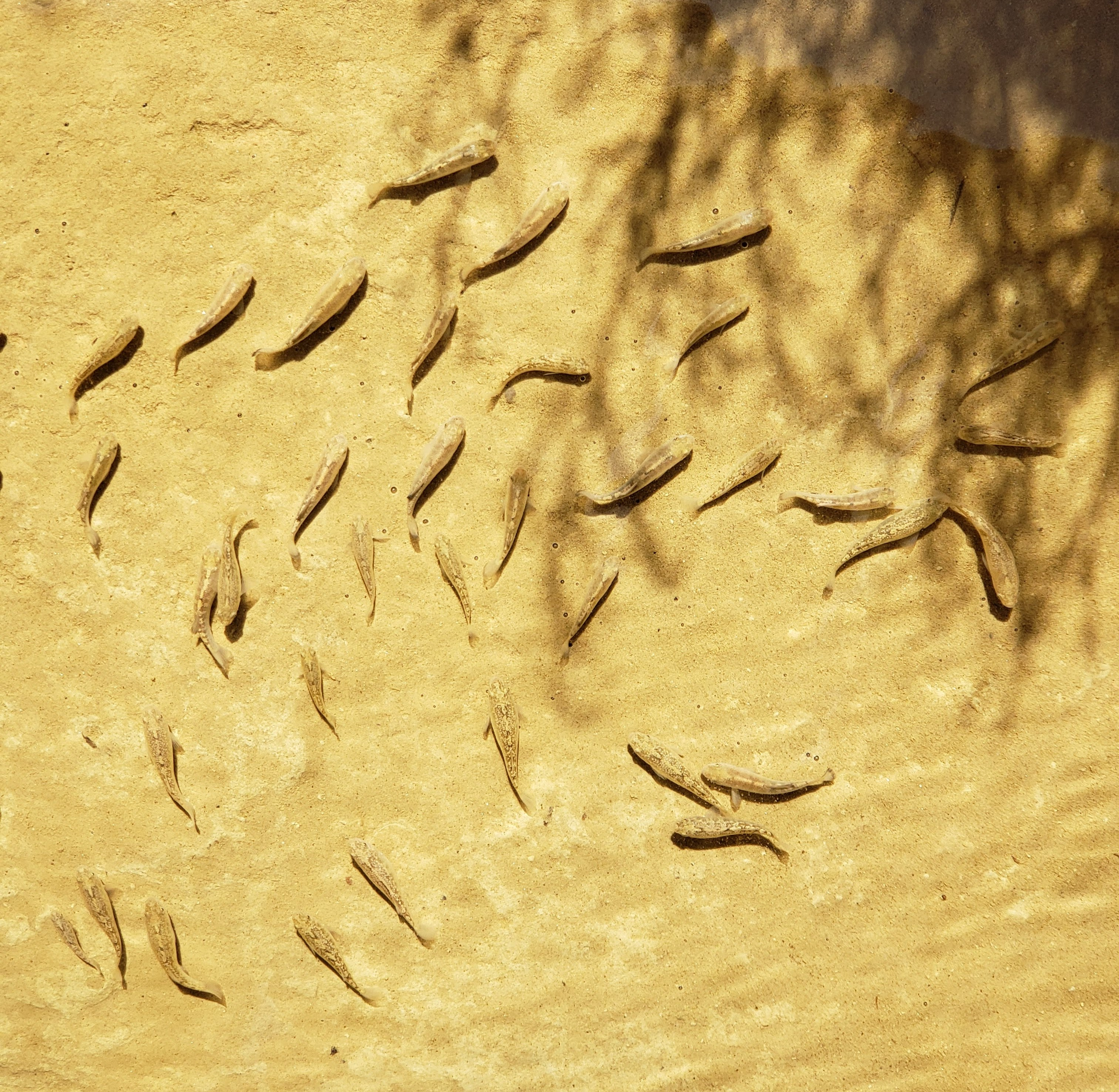
A school of Death Valley pupfish, seen in Salt Creek in 2019

This species is known from only two locations in Death Valley: Salt Creek (subspecies salinus) at about 49 m (161 ft) below sea level, and Cottonball Marsh (subspecies milleri), at about 80 m (260 ft) below sea level. They are thought to be the remainders of a large ecosystem of fish species that lived in Lake Manly, which dried up at the end of the last ice age leaving the present-day Death Valley.

The Salt Creek subspecies is also found at River Springs and Soda Lake, in Death Valley National Park.

== Diet ==
The Death Valley pupfish mostly feeds on algae and, when available, small invertebrates. In the winter, its diet primarily consists of diatoms, while in the summer it eats spirogyra.

== Conservation ==
The Death Valley pupfish has been classified as endangered by the IUCN because of its extremely restricted distribution (if the two extant locations were treated as a single unit, it would be considered critically endangered). Numbers of individuals at the locations are highly seasonally variable, and fluctuate with water level and flow volume. While the entire range of the species is located in a protected area, it may be under threat from accidental introduction of non-native species, local catastrophic events, and excessive pumping of the aquifer that feeds the habitat.

The habitats of the known Death Valley pupfish populations, characterized by warm temperatures, high salinity, and seasonal fluctuations in water availability, are vulnerable to environmental change and disturbance. Pupfish species rely on highly variable seasonal output of nutrients in order to survive. Due to the short life span of individuals (10–12 months), successful annual reproduction is crucial to population survival. Climate change-driven increases in air and water temperatures in the shallow spawning habitats can significantly reduce egg survival and increase larva mortality. Research has shown that the spawning habitats have already warmed, and it is forecast that by 2050, the window for successful optimum conditions for pupfish reproduction will have shortened by at least 2 weeks.

Changes in ground-water availability or flow can alter spring habitats and reduce suitable environments used by pupfish populations that are already experiencing seasonal fluctutations in water levels. Long-time monitoring of the Devils Hole pupfish habitat in the 1960s and 1970s showed declining water levels caused by nearby pumping, followed by recovering water levels as ground-water pumping was discontinued due to implemented management (such as hydrologic monitoring) and protection plans.

== See also ==
- Tecopa pupfish, Cyprinodon nevadensis calidae (extinct)
- Saratoga Springs pupfish, Cyprinodon nevadensis nevadensis, from Saratoga Springs at the south end of Death Valley
- Amargosa pupfish, Cyprinodon nevadensis amargosa, from the Amargosa River northwest of Saratoga Springs
- Devils Hole pupfish, Cyprinodon diabolis, critically endangered and found in Devils Hole in western Nevada
- Shoshone pupfish, Cyprinodon nevadensis shoshone
- Desert pupfish, Cyprinodon macularius
- Owens pupfish, Cyprinodon radiosus
