= Saratoga Springs pupfish =

Conservation status
- Critically Imperiled (NatureServe)

Scientific classification
- Kingdom: Animalia
- Phylum: Chordata
- Class: Actinopterygii
- Order: Cyprinodontiformes
- Family: Cyprinodontidae
- Genus: Cyprinodon
- Species: C. nevadensis
- Subspecies: C. n. nevadensis

Trinomial name
- Cyprinodon nevadensis nevadensis (C. H. Eigenmann & R. S. Eigenmann, 1889)

Subspecies of fish

The Saratoga Springs pupfish (Cyprinodon nevadensis nevadensis) is a subspecies of the Amargosa pupfish (Cyprinodon nevadensis) of the family Cyprinodontidae. The native population is endemic to Saratoga Springs, a small wetland in Death Valley National Park in the United States.

== Taxonomy ==
The pupfish is a member of the genus Cyprinodon. Most divergence of Cyprinodon species likely took place during the early-to-mid Pleistocene, a time when pluvial lakes intermittently filled the now-desert region, though some may have occurred during the last 10,000 years. The evaporation of the lakes resulted in the geographic isolation of small Cyprinodon populations and the speciation of C. nevadensis.

Ichthyologists Rosa Smith Eigenmann and Carl H. Eigenmann first identified Cyprinodon nevadensis in 1889. Later authors considered it the same species as Cyprinodon macularius. In the 1940s, Robert Rush Miller again described C. nevadensis as a distinct species, and identified six subspecies, including C. n. nevadensis.

Other subspecies include the Amargosa River pupfish (C. n. amargosae), the Ash Meadows pupfish (C. n. mionectes), the Warm Springs pupfish (C. n. pectoralis), the Shoshone pupfish (C. n. shoshone), and the extinct Tecopa pupfish (C. n. calidae).

== Description ==
Male Saratoga Springs pupfish are bright blue in color, while females are a drab olive-brown. The fish have a standard length of 4 cm (1.5 in), and the total length is rarely greater than 5 cm (2 in).

The diet of C. n. nevadensis is typical of pupfishes. Cyanobacteria (blue-green algae) are the primary food source, for which their lengthy guts are particularly well adapted. Ostracods, copepods, and the larvae of chironomids provide seasonal nutrition.

Mating behavior differs from stream-dwelling pupfishes but is similar to other spring-dwellers. Males defend territories in which females lay eggs throughout the year. While the fish are capable of surviving a wide range of temperatures, reproduction is limited to a narrower range (75–86 °F; 24–30 °C).

== Distribution and habitat ==
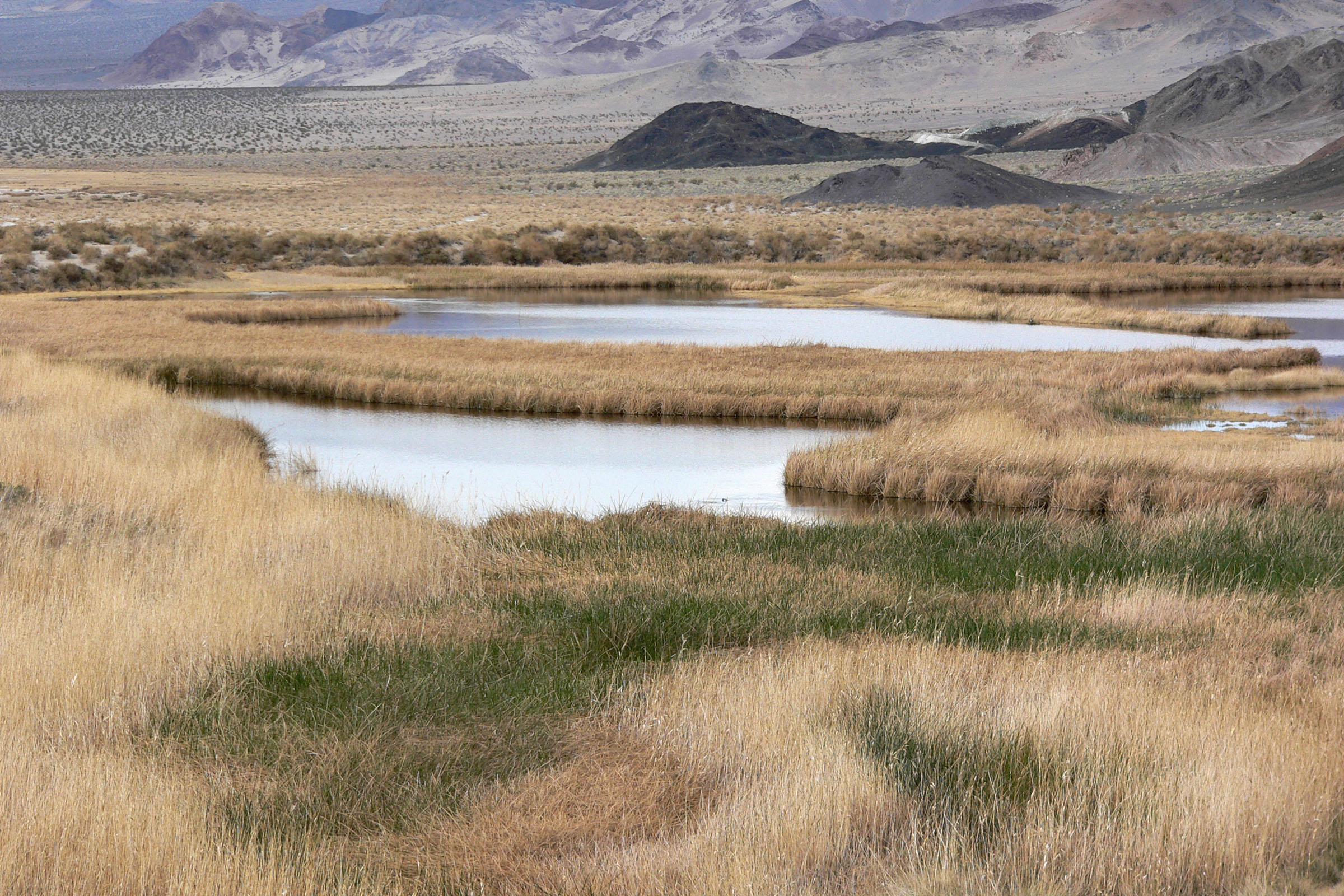
Ponds at Saratoga Springs

The fish is only known to occur naturally at Saratoga Springs. A 30-foot (9.1 m) diameter, 3–6 feet (0.91–1.83 metres) deep spring pool overflows into several ponds totaling about 4–6 acres (1.6–2.4 ha). The temperature at the spring is a near constant 82–84 degrees Fahrenheit (28–29 °C), while the ponds fluctuate seasonally between 50 and 120 degrees Fahrenheit (10 and 49 °C). Fish at all life stages are found in the ponds, but juvenile fish are not known to occur in the spring itself.

A population was introduced at Lake Tuendae, an artificial pond in Zzyzx, California, but reports conflict as to its continued survival there.

== Conservation ==
The Saratoga Springs pupfish carries no official conservation status. The state of California has identified it as possibly qualifying as threatened based on its limited distribution and the possibility that distant groundwater pumping may deplete the aquifer that supplies Saratoga Springs. The aquifer may extend to as far away as western Utah. Groundwater depletion in the Las Vegas Valley, 75 miles (121 km) to the northeast, is of particular concern.

In order to protect the pupfish and several other sensitive species, the National Park Service prohibits visitors from entering the wetland at Saratoga Springs.
