= Dos Palmas Preserve =

Wildlife preserve in California, US

Dos Palmas
- IUCN category V (protected landscape/seascape)
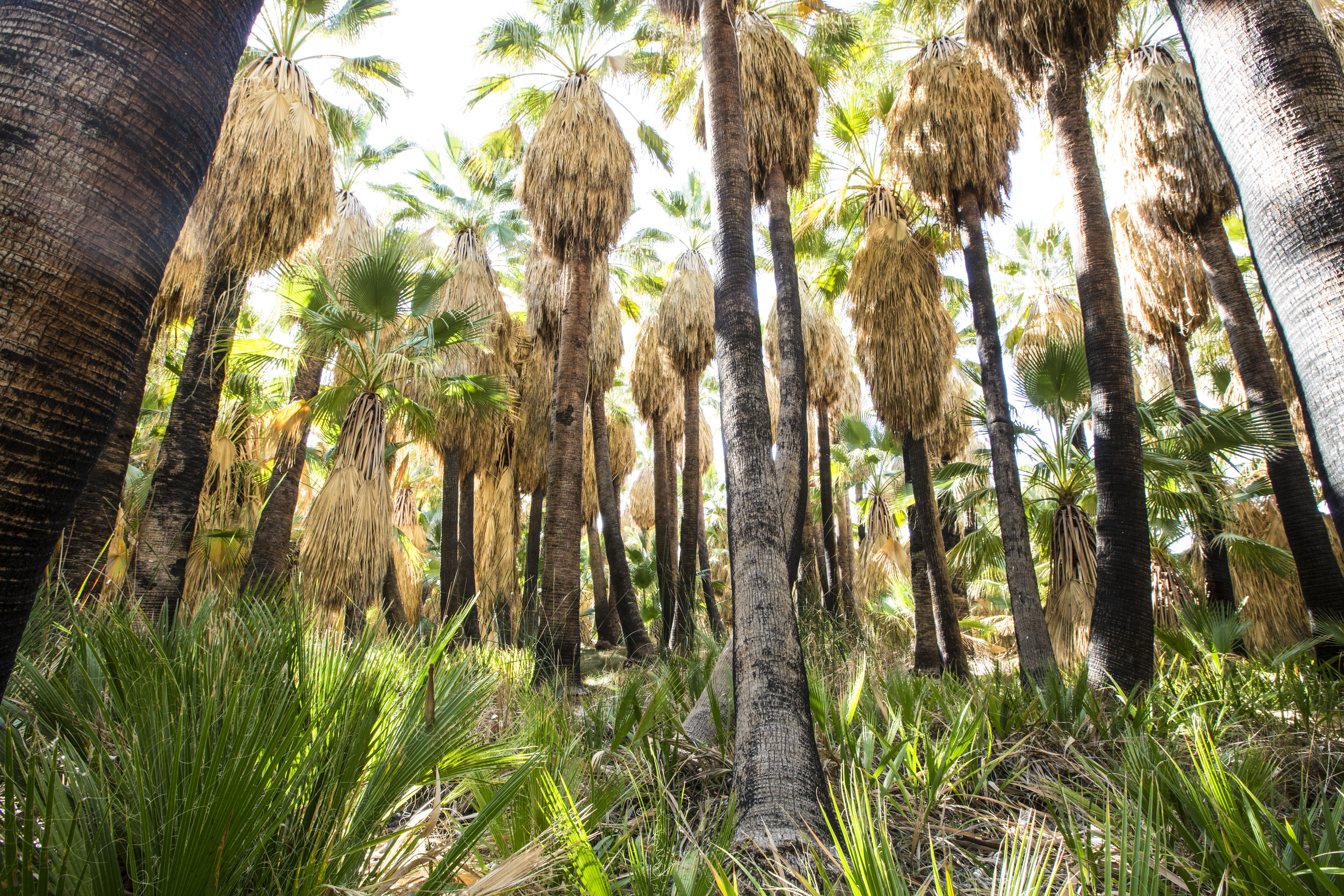
- Desert fan palms at Dos Palmas Preserve

- Location within southern California Location within California Location within the United States
- Location: Eastern Coachella Valley, California
- Nearest city: North Shore, California
- Coordinates: 33°29′58.5″N 115°50′54.3″W
- Governing body: Bureau of Land Management

Dos Palmas Preserve is a 14,000-acre (5,700 ha) wildlife preserve in the Colorado Desert in Riverside County, California, in the United States. The preserve is within the Salt Creek Area of Critical Environmental Concern, and is managed by the Bureau of Land Management. It contains a large oasis and wetland habitat, with pools fed both by water seeping from the Coachella Canal and by artesian water from several springs, including the Dos Palmas Spring. Desert fan palms are abundant.

== Plants and wildlife ==
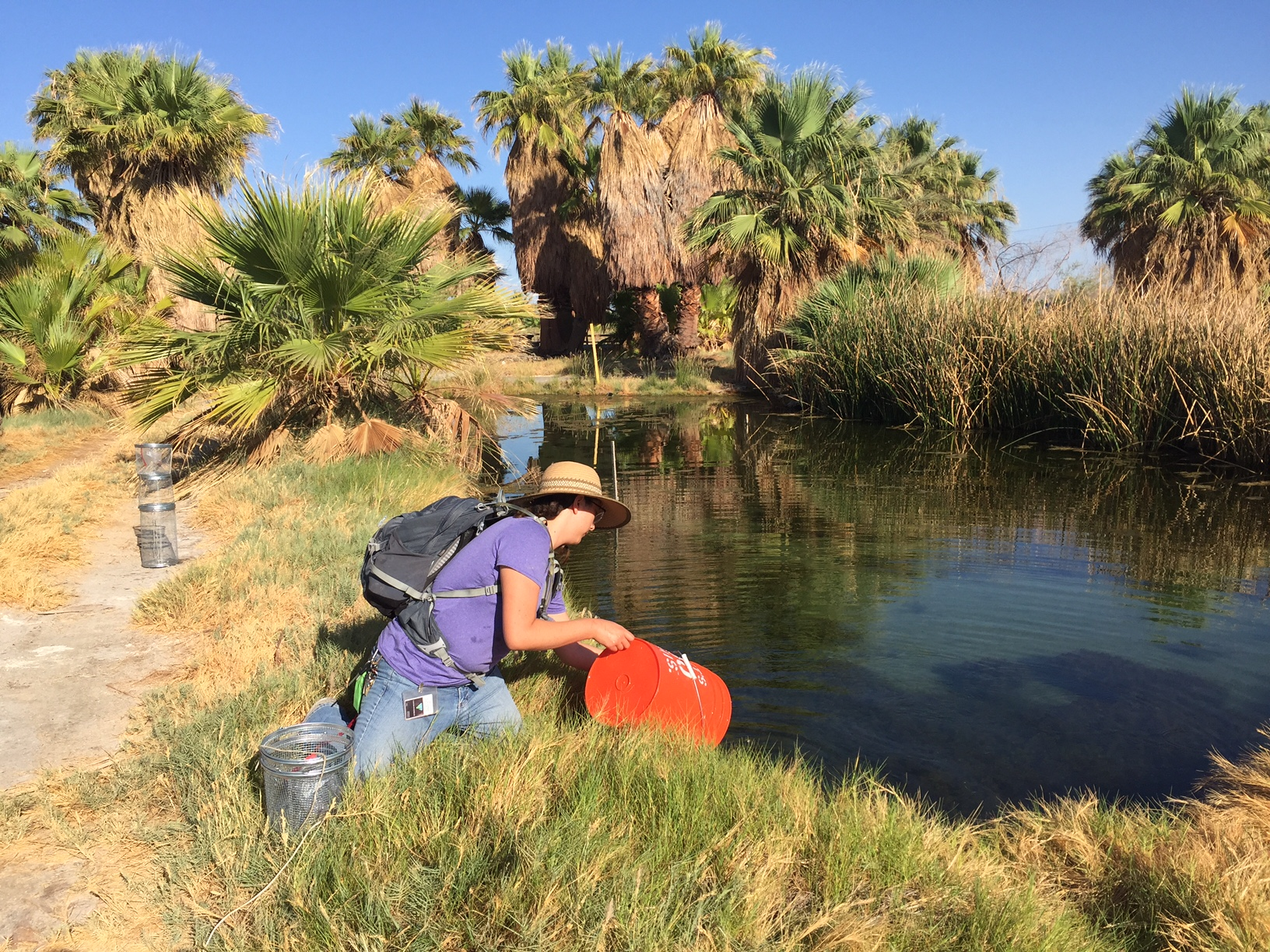
desert pupfish released into Dos Palmas.

Endangered species at the preserve include the Yuma rail (a subspecies of Ridgway's rail), the desert pupfish and Orocopia sage; the black rail is on the state "threatened" list. More common resident or migrant species that may be seen at the oasis include the American avocet, black-necked stilt, bufflehead, desert woodrat, flat-tail horned lizard, leaf-nosed bat, least bittern, osprey, lesser scaup and snowy egret. Loggerhead shrike, northern harrier and the prairie falcon are found in the surrounding desert.
