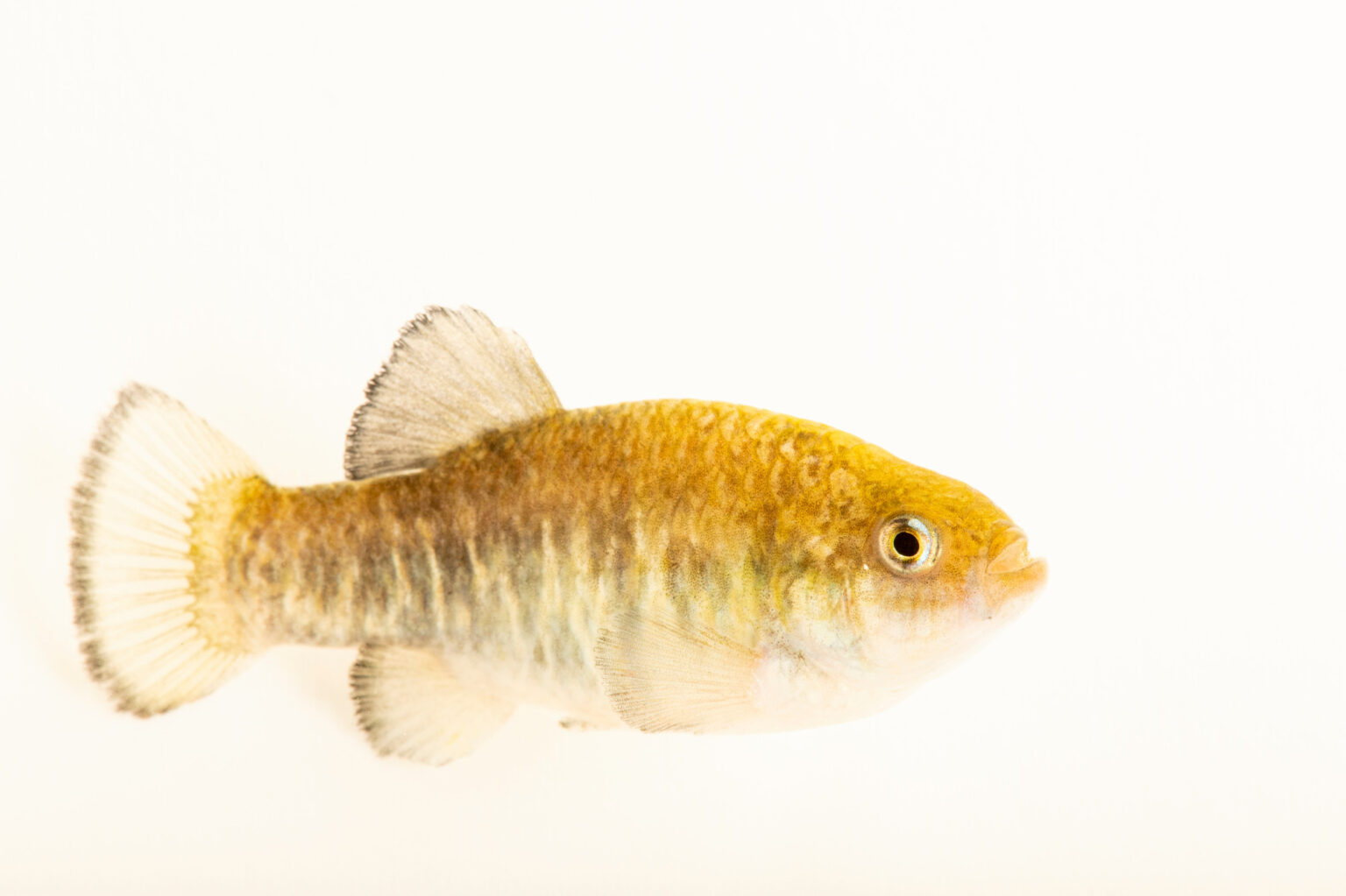

Conservation status
- Critically Imperiled (NatureServe)

Scientific classification
- Kingdom: Animalia
- Phylum: Chordata
- Class: Actinopterygii
- Division: Teleostei
- Order: Cyprinodontiformes
- Family: Cyprinodontidae
- Genus: Cyprinodon
- Species: C. nevadensis
- Subspecies: C. n. shoshone

Trinomial name
- Cyprinodon nevadensis shoshone R. R. Miller, 1948

= Shoshone pupfish =

Subspecies of fish

The Shoshone pupfish (Cyprinodon nevadensis shoshone) is a subspecies of Amargosa pupfish (Cyprinodon nevadensis) from California in the United States. They are spring-dwelling fish, endemic to Shoshone Springs on the outskirts of Shoshone, Inyo County, California. In 1969, the Shoshone pupfish was declared extinct until their eventual rediscovery by a team of biologists during a survey of Shoshone Springs in 1986. Currently, they are listed as endangered by the American Fisheries Society and are a species of special concern according to the California Department of Fish and Wildlife. The species has also brought attention to conserving the Amargosa River Basin as a whole. Several stocks of the fish are being cultivated in captivity at the University of Nevada, Las Vegas and University of California, Davis for reintroduction into the Shoshone Spring. Today, people pass through the town of Shoshone to visit the spring site and view the rare pupfish, where some infographics and signs educate visitors about them.

== Description ==
The Shoshone pupfish is characterized by large scales and a "slab-sided", narrow, slender body, with the arch of the ventral contour much less pronounced than the dorsal. Out of each of the subspecies of Amargosa pupfish, the Shoshone pupfish is the smallest. It also has fewer pelvic fin rays and scales than the other subspecies of C. nevadensis, which include the Amargosa River pupfish (C. n. amargosae), Tecopa pupfish (C. n. calidae), Warm Springs pupfish (C. n. pectoralis), Saratoga Springs pupfish, and the Ash Meadows pupfish (C. n. mionecte). All Amargosa pupfish subspecies are deep-bodied, dorsoventrally flattened fish with body lengths of less than 50 mm with blunt, steeply sloped heads and terminal mouths.

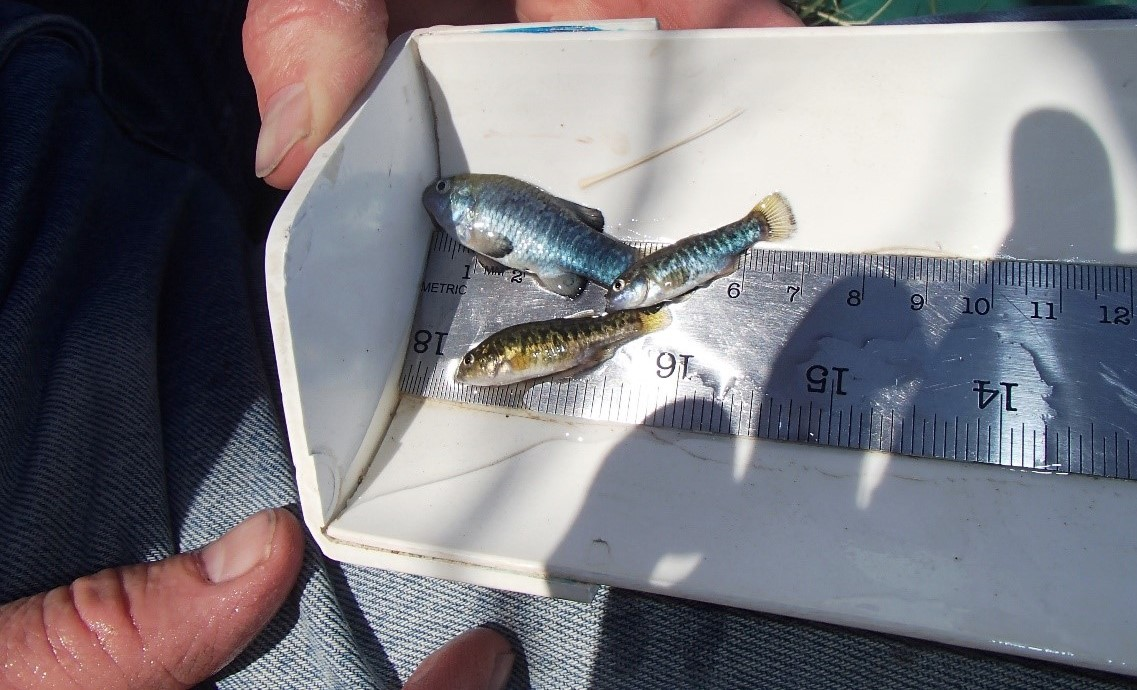
Two male & one female Shoshone pupfish collected in Shoshone Spring.

In Shoshone pupfish, sexually mature males and females differ in coloration. Breeding males are distinguished by their bright blue coloration from their heads to their caudal peduncles. The edges of their tail, dorsal, pectoral, and anal fins are lined with individual black bands. Breeding females are olive brown with 6-10 faint lateral vertical bars. Additionally, females commonly possess an ocellus (eyespot) on the posterior base of their dorsal fin. Both sexes exhibit a silvery coloration on the underside of their bodies.

== Life history ==
Pupfish, such as the Shoshone pupfish, exhibit many adaptions for life in extreme thermal and osmotic environments. In optimal conditions, pupfish growth is rapid and sexual maturity is reached within four to six weeks. This short generation time enables pupfish to maintain small but viable populations. Among the Amargosa pupfish subspecies, however, there are minor differences in generation times, with pupfish in habitats with widely fluctuating environmental conditions exhibiting the shortest.

Shoshone pupfish, like other C. nevadensis subspecies, have wide temperature tolerances (2 to 44 °C [36 to 111 °F]); however, the preferred range is 24 to 30 °C (75 to 86 °F). Temperatures below 17 °C (°F) and those above 32 °C terminate pupfish growth. Additionally, extreme temperatures affect egg production and viability; thus, any alterations to their habitat resulting in temperature changes outside optimal temperature range are reproductively and physiologically deleterious. Eggs, however, become resistant to environmental stresses within hours of being laid and fertilized.

Male and female pupfish partake in promiscuous breeding. Over time, females lay eggs with different males and can lay a few eggs at a time throughout the entirety of the year. In thermally optimal conditions and stable habitat, Shoshone pupfish can breed year-round. Their eggs are sticky demersal eggs that remain on the bottom of the water column and attach to substrate. Males maintain display territories, and territorial defense might coincide with protecting eggs from predation, although Shoshone pupfish do not exhibit parental care. Reproductive tolerances are much narrower than the general temperature tolerance of this fish, ranging from 24 to 30 °C. At pH levels below 7, reproductive performance is also degraded.

Despite being isolated as the only fish species within their biological community for an extended period, Shoshone pupfish exhibit antipredator behaviors by reducing movement and activity, as well as lowering their positions in the water column when they detect chemical alarm cues from injured conspecifics. Conservationists can use this aspect of their behavior to manage them in multi-species habitats, considering that invasive western mosquitofish (Gambusia affinis) predate on Shoshone pupfish where their territories overlap.

== Diet ==
Shoshone pupfish, like other pupfishes, feed primarily on blue-green cyanobacteria but also consume small invertebrates like chironomid larvae, ostracods, and copepods. They forage continuously from sunrise to sunset and become inactive at night. Characteristic to many aquatic herbivores, their guts are extremely long and convoluted, an adaptation that enables them to digest cyanobacteria. Their teeth are also specialized for nipping.

== Distribution ==
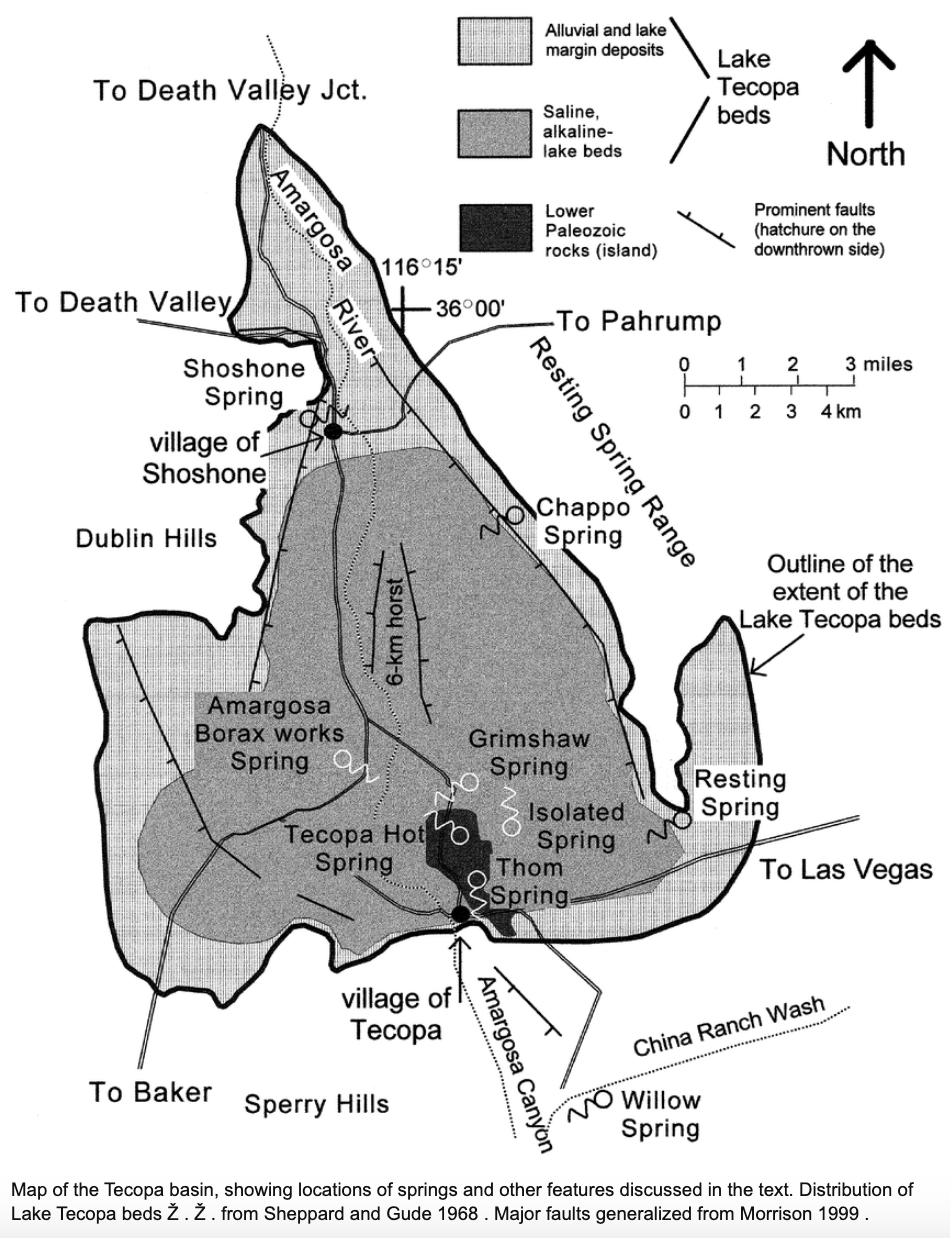
Map outlying the Tecopa Basin, which contains the Shoshone Spring.

The entire range of the Shoshone pupfish is encompassed by the Shoshone Spring. This is a small spring that feeds into the upper Amargosa River in the town of Shoshone, Inyo County, California. The town and the spring are both found within the Amargosa Valley and in the region referred to as the Amargosa Desert. The springs are 21 km north of Tecopa, California. Shoshone Spring is at an elevation of 518 meters on the base of a volcanic hill north to the town of Shoshone. This spring system is highly altered, with all its channels now considered artificial.

Historically, Shoshone pupfish were found in the entire length of the spring, from the head pool (known as "Squaw Hole") to the other end west of Highway 127. Squaw Hole is approximately 1 meter in diameter and 0.75 meters in depth. Shoshone Spring is privately owned, and most of the spring's water is being sourced for local use in the town of Shoshone. Linings of concrete line the spring source to direct the water flow towards the town. Overall, the habitat quality for pupfish is low, and managers are finding ways to mitigate this impact.

== Conservation status ==
The Shoshone pupfish was considered extinct in 1969 but was rediscovered in 1986 at the spring's outflow. It was rediscovered by F. R. Taylor, R. R. Miller (the original describer), J. W. Pedretti, and J. E. Deacon in a cleared irrigation ditch. This was documented in "Rediscovery of the Shoshone Pupfish Cyprinodon nevadensis shoshone (Cyprinodontidae), at Shoshone Springs, Inyo County, California". published in Bull. Southern California Acad. Sci. 87(2), 1988, pp 67–73. The rediscovery date was 31 July 1986, in which caudal ray count differed from the original description~~.~~ - suggesting that a genetic bottleneck had occurred in the population. Despite this, every other morphological trait matched the original description of the subspecies. Susan Sorrells, fourth-generation owner of Shoshone village, helped Taylor document and submit photos of the pupfish to the California Department of Fish and Wildlife (CDFW). The evidence was later reviewed by Phil Pister, a senior biologist who worked at the department, and confirmed to be Shoshone Pupfish.

After rediscovering the pupfish in Shoshone, Sorrells partnered with CDFW and created a pond for 40 of the fish found in the original ditch. The other half were sent to University of Nevada, Las Vegas and University of California, Davis for further research. From that pond in Shoshone, the fish population increased to around 800. However, since all the Shoshone pupfish shared one gene pool, Sorrells set out to create additional ponds for the fish. In 2002, she secured funding with the Desert Fish Habitat Partnership and created 3 additional pools, where the population of Shoshone pupfish increased to around 8,000.

The underlying reasons behind the rediscovery of the Shoshone pupfish remain unclear to this day. Currently, there are three hypotheses that potentially explain the rediscovery of the Shoshone pupfish despite their prior extinct status. The first hypothesis suggests that Cyprinodon nevadensis from another area reached Shoshone Spring through a temporary water connection during or after a flood. The second hypothesizes that pupfish from another area were artificially introduced into the springs. The third hypothesis proposes that the Shoshone pupfish simply remained undetected between 1969 and 1986 due to a small population size. Because the observed pupfish in 1986 closely match the original description of the Shoshone pupfish subspecies, researchers believe the third hypothesis may be the most accurate.^{16]}

Although rediscovered, this pupfish does not enjoy federal Endangered Species Status. It lives in one artificial pond with water supplied from the last available spring source at Shoshone Spring. It is designated as a species of Special Concern by the California Department of Fish and Wildlife.

The rediscovery of the Shoshone pupfish also prompted a larger motive to protect the Amargosa River Basin and establish it as a national monument. The groundwater that supports the pupfish comes from the Spring Mountains near Nevada, where it travels through limestone and dolomite rock into a larger aquifer. Susan Sorrells became an advocate to protect the water basin, as many endemic species, including the Shoshone pupfish, reside in Amargosa. Global warming may affect groundwater from reaching springs and seeps that the Shoshone pupfish live in. Climate change could also have unforeseeable effects on the already sensitive ecosystem.

== Management ==
Most of the Cyprinodon species in the western United States are low in numbers and are in need of conservationist aid via habitat restoration and preservation. The Shoshone pupfish is threatened by a multitude of factors, with a few including their extremely limited distribution, habitat alteration, and invasion of introduced species (namely western mosquitofish, Gambusia affinis). Shoshone pupfish are solely found in the Shoshone Spring habitat, cannot disperse to other regions, and likely will not be able to adapt if relocated. Extreme habitat alteration has shifted the Shoshone pupfish to primarily rely on artificial refuge areas established in the spring, including a series of artificial ponds that line the stream where the pupfish were originally observed. Conserving the Shoshone pupfish involves the careful management and maintenance of these artificial habitats. Managers regularly conduct surveys of the pupfish via minnow traps, visual counts, and statistical models to keep track of their population and ensure that their habitats are adequate for survival. The primary invasive species that threatens this pupfish is the western mosquitofish, which predates on young pupfish and eggs, and competes with mature pupfish for resources. Mosquitofish are removed whenever they are encountered during surveys of the spring.

Another method of conserving this pupfish involves captive breeding in artificial tanks. In 1988, biologists noted that only 20 individuals remained in the wild, prompting the creation of two captive populations. During a survey in 1988, a large number of the Shoshone pupfish population was removed and relocated to either UC Davis or the University of Nevada, Las Vegas for propagation in hopes to boost the wild population. A total of 72 captive-raised individuals from UC Davis were released in Shoshone Spring in 1989 to supplement the population.

Susan Sorrells, whose family has owned Shoshone Village for four generations, plays a pivotal role in managing the Shoshone pupfish population. Shoshone once was a small mining town, and the water that the Shoshone pupfish relied on was used by humans seeking hay for farm animals. Because Sorrells was raised in Shoshone for the majority of her life, she applies what she calls a "listening to the land" approach. This method stems from understanding how the natural processes work and function to support the fragile ecosystem, and integrating restoration projects that work in tandem with those processes. Sorrells managed to relocate the sensitive species into restored groundwater pools that capture the nearby spring's flow, also creating reliable water sources for migratory birds and other native species.

Owing to her efforts, Shoshone village has become a popular ecotourism spot, visited by 1.5 million people per year passing through to and from Death Valley National Park creating a bustling economy. The funds she generates from Shoshone creates financial sustainability to maintain and improve conservation efforts of the Shoshone pupfish and other endangered species in the Amargosa Basin. Sorrells also established the Shoshone Education and Research Center (SHEAR), where universities and other researchers can conduct their own ecology studies on the desert habitat.

== See also ==
- Pupfish

=== Other local Cyprinodon ===
- Death Valley pupfish, Salt Creek pupfish Cyprinodon salinus
- Shoshone Pupfish, Cyprinodon nevadensis shoshone
- Tecopa Pupfish, Cyprinodon nevadensis calidae (extinct)
- Devils Hole pupfish Cyprinodon diabolis
- Desert pupfish Cyprinodon macularius
- Owens pupfish Cyprinodon radiosus
