= Phil Pister =

American fishery biologist (1929-2023)

Edwin Philip Pister
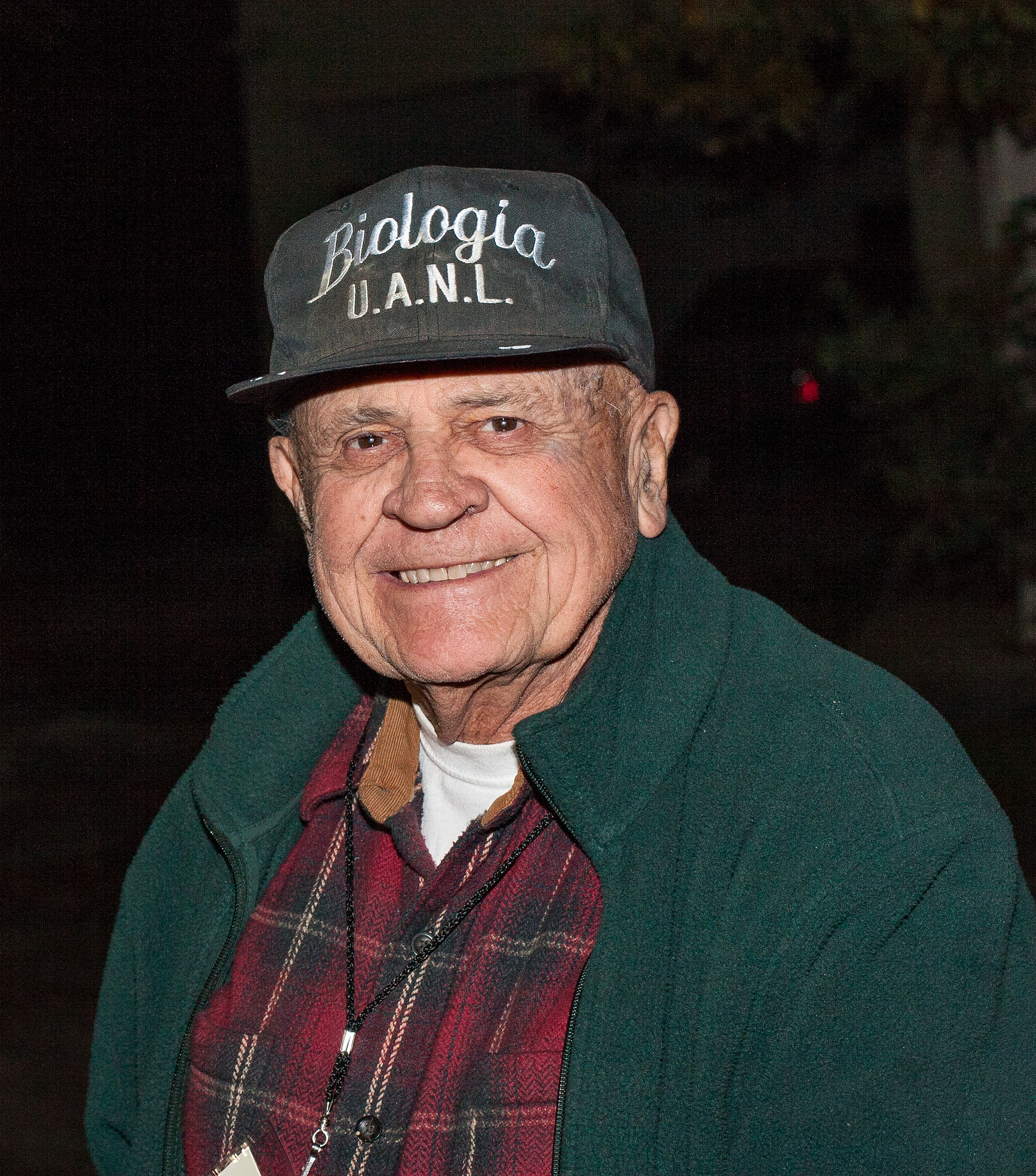
- Born: January 15, 1929; Stockton, California, U.S.
- Died: January 17, 2023 (aged 94); Bishop, California, U.S.
- Occupations: Fishery biologist, conservationist, deep ecologist
- Writing career
- Subjects: Desert fishes, conservation, environmental ethics

Edwin Philip Pister (January 15, 1929 – January 17, 2023) was an American fishery biologist who worked for California Department of Fish and Game. He was a pioneer of desert fish conservation, and is credited with saving the Owens pupfish (Cyprinodon radiosis) by transferring the entire remaining population into several buckets and transporting them to a safe location.

Pister was born in Stockton, California and lived in Bishop, California. A volume compiling studies of desert fishes has been published in his honor. He has written and published scientific and popular papers and has also written about environmental ethics.

Pister helped found the non-profit Desert Fishes Council in 1969, serving as its first president, then as its Executive Secretary until his death.

Audio interviews of him are available in the Bancroft Library at University of California, Berkeley

Pister died in Bishop, California on January 17, 2023, two days after his 94th birthday.

== Awards ==
- Order of the Jassid (for conservation) from Sierra Pacific Flyfishers
- President's Fishery Conservation Award from the American Fisheries Society
- The Edward T. LaRoe III Memorial Award from the Society for Conservation Biology.
- 2018 Andrea Lawrence Award from the Mono Lake Committee.
