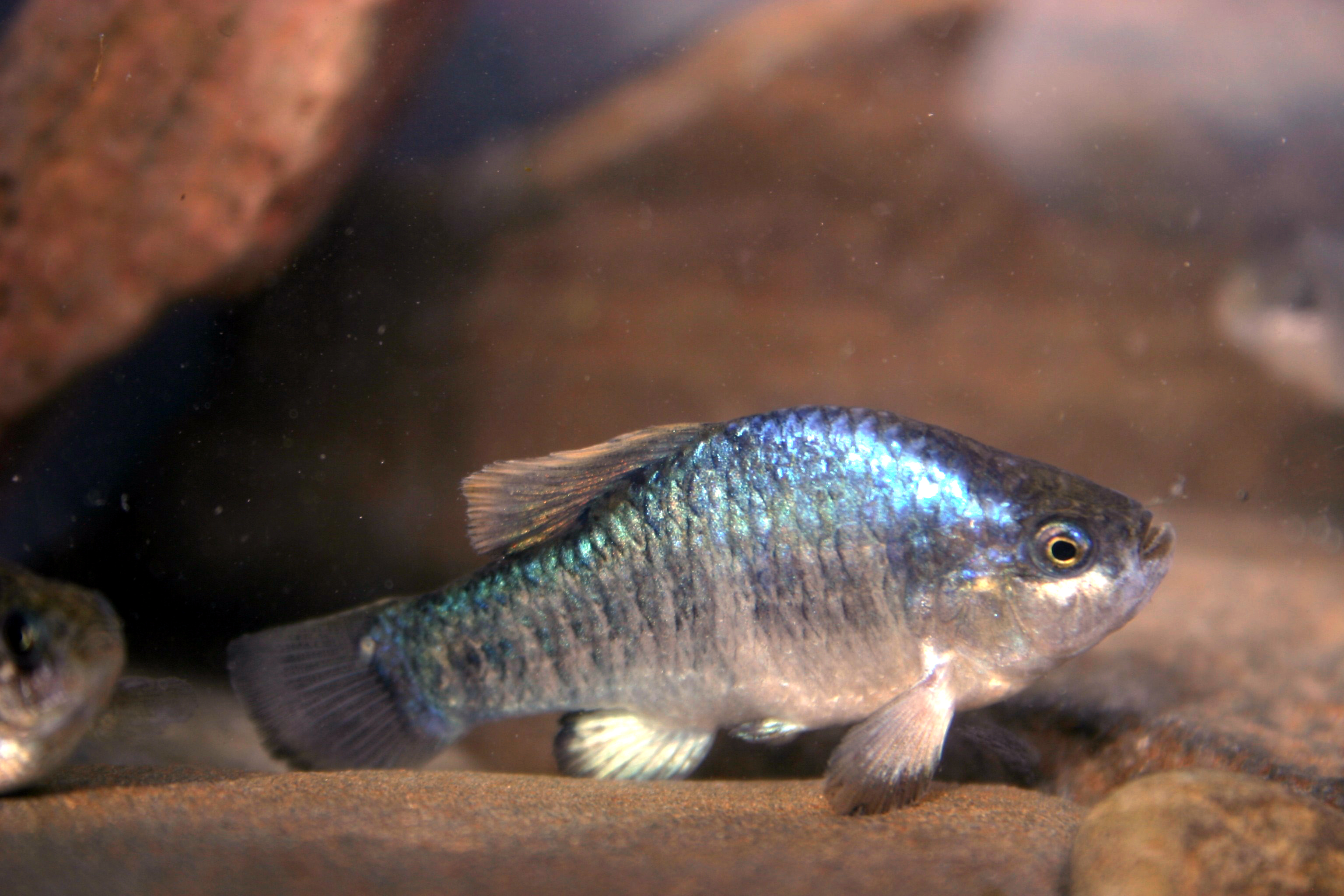

Conservation status
- Endangered (IUCN 3.1)

- Endangered (ESA)

Scientific classification
- Kingdom: Animalia
- Phylum: Chordata
- Class: Actinopterygii
- Division: Teleostei
- Order: Cyprinodontiformes
- Family: Cyprinodontidae
- Genus: Cyprinodon
- Species: C. radiosus

Binomial name
- Cyprinodon radiosus R. R. Miller, 1948

= Owens pupfish =

Species of fish

The Owens pupfish (Cyprinodon radiosus) is a rare species of fish in the family Cyprinodontidae, the pupfish. It is endemic to California in the United States, where it is limited to the Owens Valley. It is a federally listed endangered species of the United States in 1967. It was then added to the State Endangered list in 1971, and it is also listed as an endangered species under the international standard. This pupfish is up to 5 centimetres (2.0 inches) long, the largest males sometimes longer. The male is blue-gray, turning bright blue during spawning. The female is greenish brown with a silvery or whitish belly.

== Ecology and behavior ==
The pupfish tolerates a wide range of water conditions. Its native habitat includes desert marshes with water temperatures up to 33 °C in the summer and layers of ice during the winter. The water in some areas has four times the salt content of the ocean, as well as low oxygen.

The Owens pupfish primarily consumes aquatic insects, mainly consisting of midge larvae and sometimes mayfly larvae, mosquito larvae, and beetle larvae. They also consume small crustaceans, terrestrial insects that occupy the water, algae, carrion, and fish eggs.

Typically, species in the genus Cyprinodon reproduce ranging from May to September, with the season peaking in June and July in particular. There are territorial, satellite, and sneaker types of male mating behavior. Females can lay 10 eggs daily on average for multiple times during the reproductive season. However, pupfish have a very short reproductive cycle in April. When captured during the summer, both male and female fish were not in breeding season and died out within days despite being placed in the spring water they are used to living in.

This fish was once common in the Owens Valley of California, occurring in most water bodies between Fish Slough and Lone Pine, which are 70 miles apart. The bodies of water are shallow, up to 3 feet in depth, and have a temperature between 18 and 20 degrees Celsius. It occurred in the Owens River and associated sloughs and marshes. Its habitat usually consists of spring pools, sloughs, irrigation ditches, swamps, and flooded pastures in the Owen’s Valley from Fish Slough in Mono County to Lone Pine in Inyo County.At that time the Paiute people scooped them out of the water and dried them for the winter.

== Recovery efforts ==
The diversion of water from the Owens River to the Los Angeles Metropolitan Area during the California Water Wars eliminated most of the water bodies that were the pupfish's habitat. Predation by introduced species of fish may have decimated remaining populations. By 1942 this pupfish was believed to be extinct. It was rediscovered in 1969, when one population of about 800 individuals was found. When they were transferred to a safer location by Phil Pister, a retired district fishery biologist, the entire global population of this pupfish was contained in two buckets. Since the pupfish were a fragile species, many of them died before making it to relocation in Fish Slough. The California Department of Fish and Game established six populations in carefully managed refuge using these fish. While not all of the original six populations still exist today, the CDFW is still protecting and maintaining the population. The Endangered Species Act of 1973 was later passed on to help with more direct recovery efforts for different species on a grander scale. In 2021, another population of Owens pupfish was established at the River Spring Lakes Ecological Reserve in Mono County, California. This brought the total number of populations back up to 6. To establish this new population, pupfish were sourced from the five other extant populations and translocated to the approximately 650-acre (264-hectare) reserve.

The local Bishop Pauite tribe located at the base of the Eastern Sierra Nevada Mountains in Bishop, California, joined the U.S. Fish and Wildlife Service, the California Department of Fish and Wildlife, and the Los Angeles Department of Water and Power to create a place of refuge for the Owen’s Pupfish, which was located within the Tribe’s Conservation Open Space Area. The Bishop Paiute tribe’s effort to try and preserve this species is closely associated with the species' importance in the tribe’s cultural history. The Owens Pupsfish was one of the primary foods consumed by the local Paiute people.

== Threats to survival ==
One of the key causes that has threatened the survival of the Owens Pupfish species has been the water diversions and groundwater pumping, which have ecologically transformed the natural habitats by drying out the wetlands and marshlands that this species inhabits. Much of the Owens Basin is owned by the City of Los Angeles, and the Los Angeles Department of Water and Power sources much of their water from the Owens Basin. This extraction of water from Owen’s Basin to Los Angeles has only increased in recent years, with the steep growth in population leading to a higher demand for natural resources like water. Much of the water in the Owens Basin is also used for agricultural purposes, and this has led to an overall depletion and extraction of natural resources in this area.

Climate change has also played a major role in depleting the Owens pupfish species numbers. Because this species exists in a very arid region, their habitats are very dependent upon snowmelt, which supports aquifers and the surface flow. Due to climate change, snowpack levels have depleted, leading to a prolonged drought in the area affecting the species’ natural habitat.

== Evolutionary research ==
Threats to the six populations include the encroachment of cattails into the waterways. The plant clogs the habitat and collects detritus, which eliminates the pupfish's breeding substrates. The CDFG tends the four populations, clearing out the cattails. Introduced species of aquatic organisms also pose a threat. They include predatory fish such as largemouth bass (Micropterus salmoides), smallmouth bass (Micropterus dolomieu), brown trout (Salmo trutta), and bluegill (Lepomis macrochirus), as well as crayfish (Pacifastacus leniusculus) and bullfrogs (Rana catesbeiana). The severe reduction of the species into a single small population may have created a genetic bottleneck; genetic analysis is underway.

Other local Cyprinodon include Death Valley pupfish (Cyprinodon salinus salinus), Shoshone pupfish (Cyprinodon nevadensis shoshone), the extinct Tecopa pupfish (Cyprinodon nevadensis calidae), Devils Hole pupfish (Cyprinodon diabolis), and the desert pupfish (Cyprinodon macularius).
