= Eastern Coachella Valley =

Valley in Southern California

Coordinates: 33.547°N 116.019°W

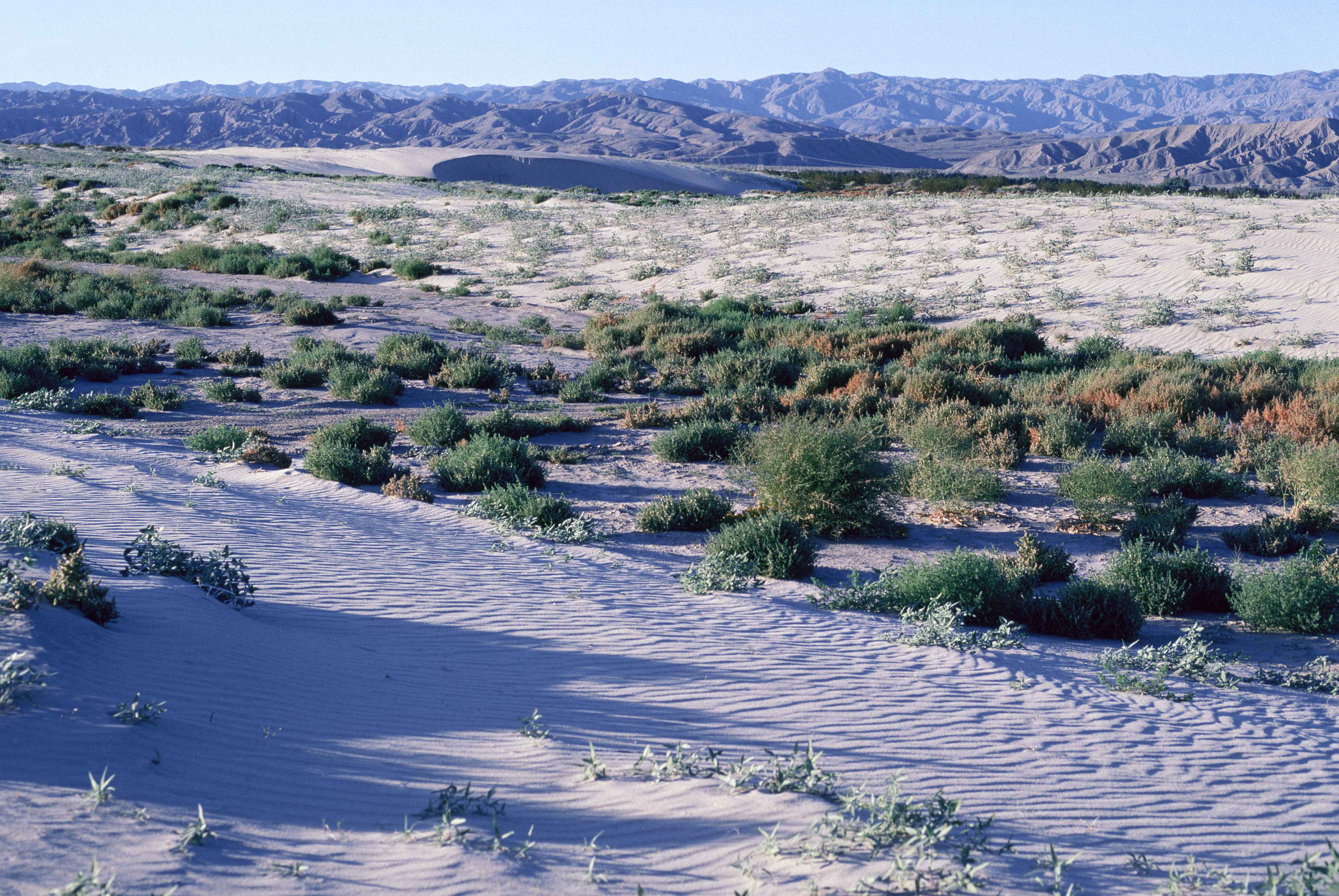
Coachella valley desert

The Eastern Coachella Valley is located in Southern California. It is known to locals as a geographical subdivision of the Coachella Valley. In other words, although the Eastern Coachella Valley is located within the same Coachella Valley geographical parameters, it is considered its own. This subdivision is due primarily to the lack of incorporation of rural communities to the entity of the Coachella Valley as a whole.

The Eastern Coachella Valley is made up of four rural and unincorporated communities. These communities include Thermal, Oasis, Mecca, and North Shore. These communities are home to predominantly Latino or Hispanic agricultural working families. Majority of these families are low-income and of Mexican or Mexican-American descent.

Agricultural workers represent the main local labor force. They contribute approximately 430 million dollars a year to the region [8]. These rural and unincorporated communities constitute the back bone of the American Food System. However, despite their noteworthy contribution to the American Food System, they live in impoverished environments and conditions. Challenging water and waste water conditions, plus the few economic opportunities found in these regions are factors that contribute to the continuation of poverty in the area.

== Communities and population ==
The Eastern Coachella Valley is an area whose population is increasing fast due to its location. Its location is of great importance because it is located near the Californian and Mexican Border, in which most immigrants tend to settle in search for year-round or seasonal work. The Eastern Coachella Valley consists of four different cities.

Community	Population
Mecca	8,577
North Shore	3,477
Thermal	2,865
Oasis	6,890
Eastern Coachella Valley Total Population	21,809

== Agriculture ==
Due to the year-round warm weather and desert climates home to the area, the rural Eastern Coachella Valley has become one of the main agricultural producer bases in California. The Eastern side of the Coachella Valley is the primary region in which agriculture cultivation processes take place and where most farm works tend to reside. Most farm workers reside in this area for seasonal terms or year-round to work in the agricultural fields or crops. The valley is fundamentally the most important region responsible for date crops in the United States. Although the Coachella Valley is well known for its dates, it is also the agricultural land of other vegetables and fruits cultivated year-round or seasonally. Table grapes, for example, are also cultivated seasonally in a great majority of the agricultural fields that make up the Eastern Coachella Valley. Other vegetables and fruits include but are not limited to mangos, peaches, tomatoes, watermelons, melons, cabbage, lettuce, broccoli, carrots, corn, spinach, cauliflower, garlic, onion, green beans, strawberries, celery, potatoes, citrus fruits such as lemons, limes, oranges, grapefruit; and also bell peppers of different colors which include yellow, green, and red.

The Eastern Coachella Valley's farmworkers play an important role in sustaining the US workforce and economy. Companies such as the Prime Time Produce company describe the Eastern Coachella Valley as "[o]ne of the richest growing regions in the world. " [10] The Eastern Coachella Valley has become the base of Prime Time's operations and many other companies to this day due to its mass production of diverse fruits and vegetables. Farmworkers in the Eastern Coachella Valley face many challenges. Agriculture in the US is a dangerous job, since farm workers have to do repetitive movements like heavy lifting, and lengthy periods of standing and/or kneeling that are associated with injuries, fractures, chronic pain, and more. The extreme heat in the Eastern Coachella Valley has become one of the major challenges workers face. Heat has become the biggest climate hazard that farm workers have experienced, as they are exposed to conditions that are expected to be long and with high intensity while they are working outside in the fields. Despite this, workers in the Valley often lack access to health care because of linguistic or socioeconomic challenges.

== Organizations and activities ==
=== Building Healthy Communities ===
The Eastern Coachella Valley Building Healthy Communities (BHC) organization is a "10-year program funded by The California Endowment. This organization aims to build healthy communities throughout the Eastern Coachella Valley. Their events and activities tend to focus mostly on youth members of the rural communities that make up the valley. Activities and events imposed by (BHC) bring the rural community residents together and their families while simultaneously incorporating information and knowledge concerning healthy alternatives for a better lifestyle.

=== Raices Cultura ===
The mission of Raices Cultura is to create a safe space for the Eastern Coachella Valley community to expose and express their art and culture. They aim to create a healthier community and have the voices of the Eastern Coachella Valley be heard. The youth plays a very important role in this organization because most of the events are organized by young members/ participants of this group. The youth also help spread the word about this organizations and get other youngsters to join the organization or to attend and enjoy the variety of events they impose/create. Raices Cultura screens films every month and have an art studio which is open almost every Saturday for the public and especially the youth to take advantage of.

One way they bring the community together is through the Community Garden Project. Through this community garden, they create consciousness about the environment, health, and economic benefits that result when people grow their own food. Raices Cultura has started a community garden where organic food is grown. This community garden provides and will continue to provide healthier food for the community without harming the environment. This community-based activity serves as an alternative to chemical- and GMO-grown crops. Their non-GMO, and organic standards creates knowledge that informs the youth of healthier practices.

Another way that Raices Cultura creates a safe space for the Eastern Coachella Valley communities and allows residents, especially the youth, to express their art and culture is through the annual Hue Music & Arts Festival.

The HUE Music and Art Festival event in the Eastern Coachella Valley featuring music, visual art and food. The festival involves musicians, artists and volunteers, and sponsors, and provides community to participate in cultural and social activities.

=== Coachella Unincorporated ===
The Coachella Unincorporated is an organization funded by the Building Healthy Communities Initiative of the California Endowment by a media in San Francisco [7]. The purpose/ goal of this organization is to have the voices of the Eastern Coachella Valley to be heard. Students that attend high schools located in the Eastern Coachella Valley participate in this project by reporting stories that will create change in the communities. This organization allows so that the youth can express and document their lived experiences and current events through the various journalism projects the organization creates.

=== Pueblo Unido Community Development Corporation ===
Pueblo Unido Community Development Corporation is a non-profit organization. This organization helps represent those residing on the Eastern Coachella Valley underrepresented communities of Thermal, Oasis, Mecca, and North Shore. They help these communities by engaging with the residents and their families in the search for solutions to their needs and ways of improving the quality of their lives. This organization was initiated by local leaders who want to set an example, change, and help transform their communities by fixing local problems. Local problems such as fixing broken drainage systems or irrigation systems for the less fortunate in the Eastern Valley are examples of the work this organization fulfills.

== Transportation ==
Compared to the metropolitan regions found elsewhere other than in the Eastern Coachella Valley communities, there happens to be a lack of public transportation available for residents. The SunLine Transit Agency is the most well known source of public transportation in rural and urban communities of the valley.

The main method of public transportation is the SunBus. The SunBus is the given name for the transit bus. Although the SunBus runs through Mecca, Thermal and Oasis there is no public transportation in North Shore. The Sun Bus allows members of these rural communities to travel to the urban or metropolitan communities such as Coachella, Indio, La Quinta, Palm Desert and Palm Springs that make up the entity of the Coachella Valley as a whole.

=== Education ===
The Eastern Coachella Valley consists of one public high school, one public middle school, and five public elementary schools.

High School

- Coachella Valley High School, located in Thermal, California
- Desert Mirage High School, located in Thermal, California

Middle School

- Toro Canyon Middle School, located in Thermal, California

Elementary Schools

- Las Palmitas Elementary School, located in Thermal, California
- Oasis Elementary School, located in Oasis, California
- Mecca Elementary School, located in Mecca, California
- Saul Martinez Elementary School, located in Mecca, California
- John Kelley Elementary School, located in Thermal, California

College

- Extended Branch of College of the Desert, located in Mecca, California

== Attractions ==
Alternative to the mainstream Coachella Valley Music and Arts Festival there are also other places and events visited both by tourists and locals. The few attractions found in the Eastern Coachella Valley are local museums such as the International Banana Museum located in North Shore, California. This museum has over 19,000 banana related items and pictures that capture the attention of the several locals and tourists in search of a unique adventure.

Another visited site by tourists and local North Shore residents is the Salton Sea. What makes the Salton Sea a remarkable attraction is mostly due to the fact that (1) it is the largest California lake and (2) because it is located in the San Andreas Fault. This site attracts mostly geologists or environmentalists that seek research and other studies about the geology or pollution of the lake.

Box Canyon is another location visited by tourists and local residents. Box Canyon runs through Mecca, California and North Shore, California. For the most part, Box Canyon is a place where people go to hike, walk, and explore the deserted nature it has to offer. This site is an attraction for people who are interested in mountain hiking or adventures. Within Box Canyon, there is Ladder Canyon. Ladder Canyon has a man-made trail for ease people when hiking. This ease in hiking in part by the use of ladders throughout the deserted and sandy trails.

Another well known attraction that takes place in the Eastern Coachella Valley is The HUE Music and Arts Festival. This annual event takes place in Thermal, California. The HUE Festival is an alternative festival to the mainstream Coachella Valley Music and Arts Festival. The HUE is an event that is managed by ECV youth and several local leaders and organizations. This festival gives the youth an opportunity to display and express their art and music talent while simultaneously bringing the unrepresented and unincorporated communities together. Most of the art represents the struggles and lived experiences faced by the Eastern Coachella Valley communities.
