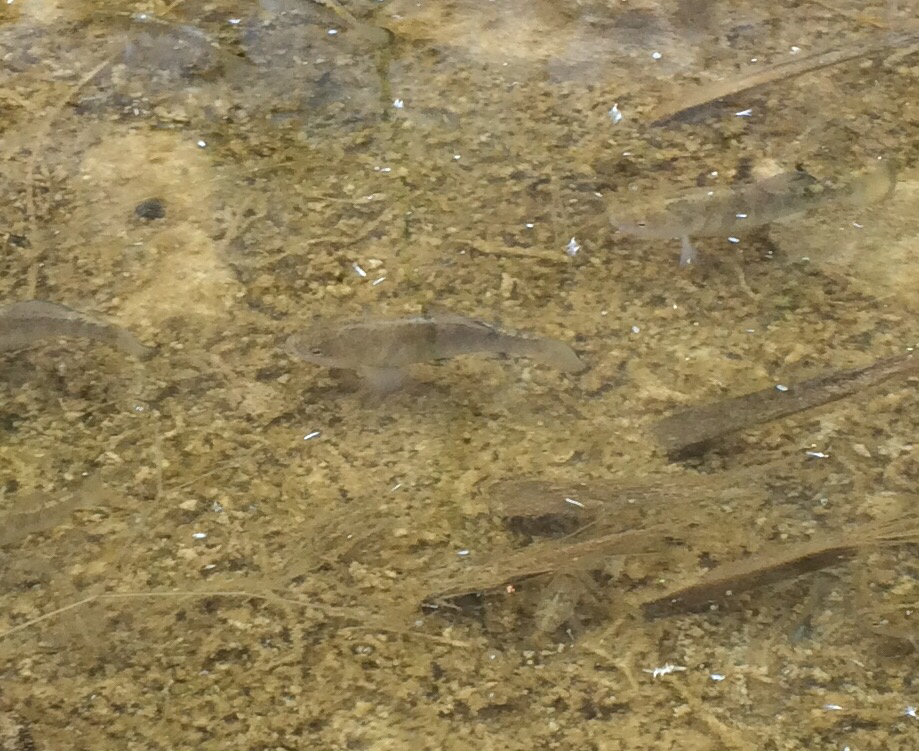
- California

Conservation status
- Vulnerable (IUCN 3.1)

- Imperiled (NatureServe)

Scientific classification
- Kingdom: Animalia
- Phylum: Chordata
- Class: Actinopterygii
- Order: Cyprinodontiformes
- Family: Cyprinodontidae
- Genus: Cyprinodon
- Species: C. nevadensis

Binomial name
- Cyprinodon nevadensis (C. H. Eigenmann & R. S. Eigenmann, 1889)

Subspecies
- C. n. nevadensis C. n. amargosae C. n. mionectes C. n. pectoralis C. n. shoshone †C. n. calidae

= Cyprinodon nevadensis =

Species of fish

Cyprinodon nevadensis is a species of pupfish in the genus Cyprinodon. The species is also known as the Amargosa pupfish, but that name may also refer to one subspecies, Cyprinodon nevadensis amargosae. All six subspecies are or were endemic to very isolated locations in the Mojave Desert of California and Nevada. Specifically, the pupfish have been found in Tecopa Bore, Inyo County, which links to the Amargosa River and Saratoga Springs, in addition to the lakes connected to it.

Amargosa pupfish habitats in freshwater types, including streams, springs, and spring-fed ponds and lakes.

They are small in size, and usually grow up to 25-30 mm in several months, but rarely exceed 50 mm. These pupfish have deeper, broader bodies, with a blunt head and a small, oblique terminal mouth.

Amargosa pupfish are omnivores, and have a diet consisting of algae and cyanobacteria. They also eat small invertebrates.

Male pupfish are bright blue and have a black band on the edge of the tail fin. Female pupfish are olive-brown with metallic blue on their shoulders and upper sides during breeding stages. Male pupfish are protective of their breeding territories and aggressively drive off other male fish. Female disperse their eggs a few at a time and in different locations. Male pupfish guard the territory that the eggs are laid in.

== Subspecies ==
- Cyprinodon nevadensis nevadensis, the Saratoga Springs pupfish, is the nominate subspecies. It was originally limited to Saratoga Springs in Death Valley National Park. A population was introduced at Lake Tuendae in Zzyzx, California, but it may not have survived there.
- Cyprinodon nevadensis amargosae, the Amargosa River pupfish or Amargosa Pupfish, was originally endemic to two sections of the lower Amargosa River. In 1940, a population was introduced at River Springs in Mono County, California.

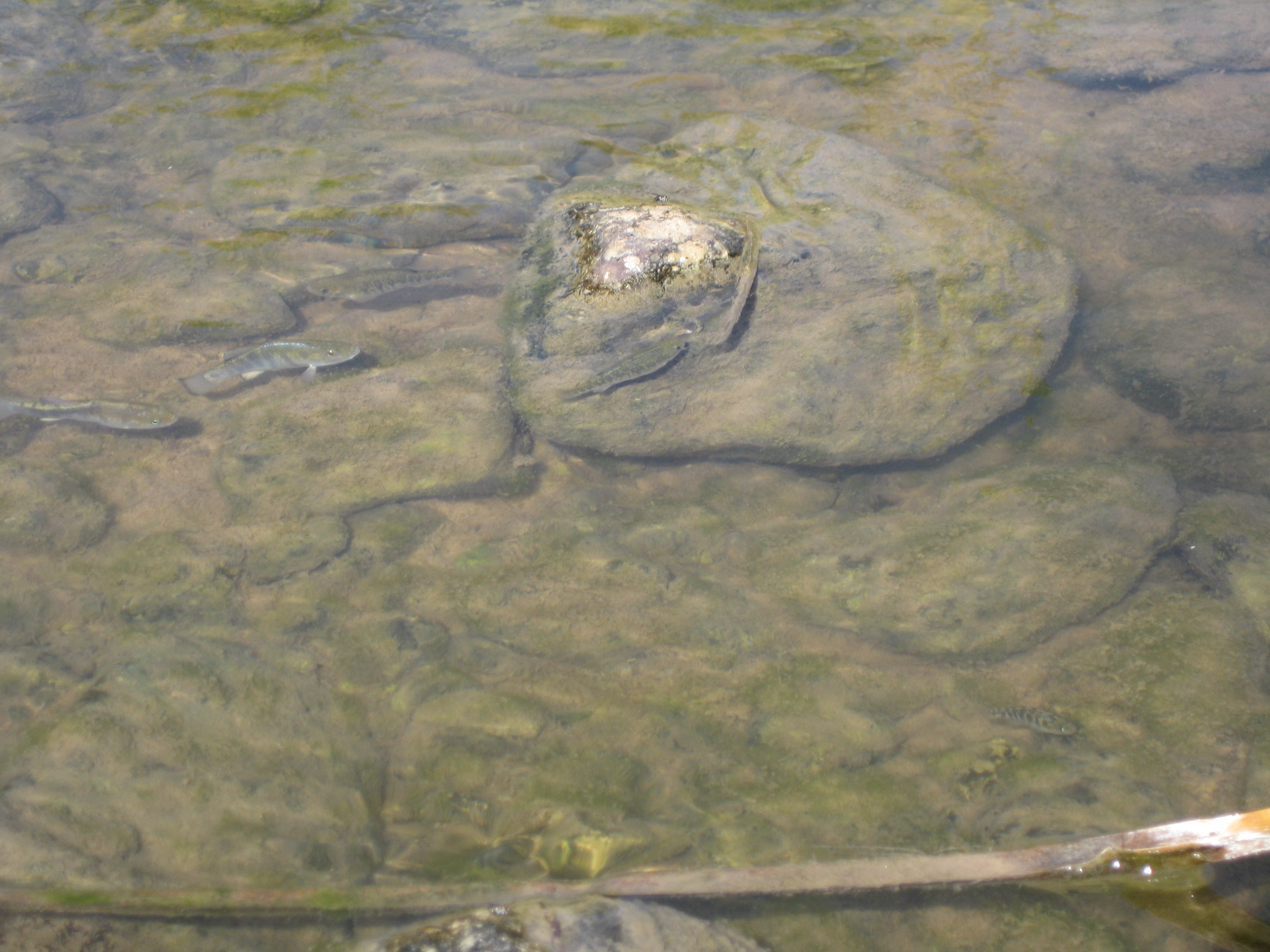
Likely subspp. amargosae: taken May 2014 in Amargosa River Canyon, downstream from Tecopa Triangle and upstream from waterfalls above confluence with Willow Creek. The second fish from the left in the photograph is male, as indicated by the blue coloration, shown here particularly in his dorsal stripe

- Cyprinodon nevadensis mionectes, the Ash Meadows pupfish or Ash Meadows Amargosa pupfish, is listed as endangered under the Endangered Species Act. It is limited to Ash Meadows National Wildlife Refuge in Nevada.
- Cyprinodon nevadensis pectoralis, the Warm Springs pupfish, is also listed as endangered under the ESA. It is restricted to six springs inside the Ash Meadows National Wildlife Refuge .
- Cyprinodon nevadensis shoshone, the Shoshone pupfish, is listed as a Species of Concern by the United States Fish and Wildlife Service. The fish is limited to Shoshone Spring, near the town of Shoshone, California, and possibly parts of the Amargosa River.
- †Cyprinodon nevadensis calidae, the Tecopa pupfish, was declared extinct in 1981, and was the first taxon to be removed from the endangered species list due to extinction.

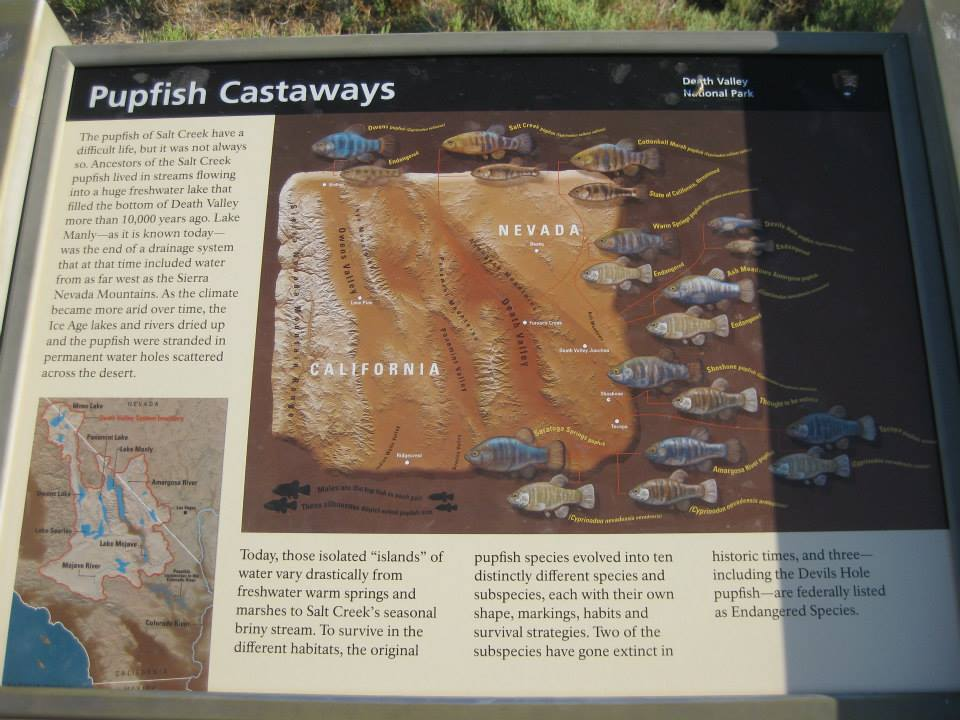
National Park Service interpretive signage at Salt Creek, Death Valley National Park.
