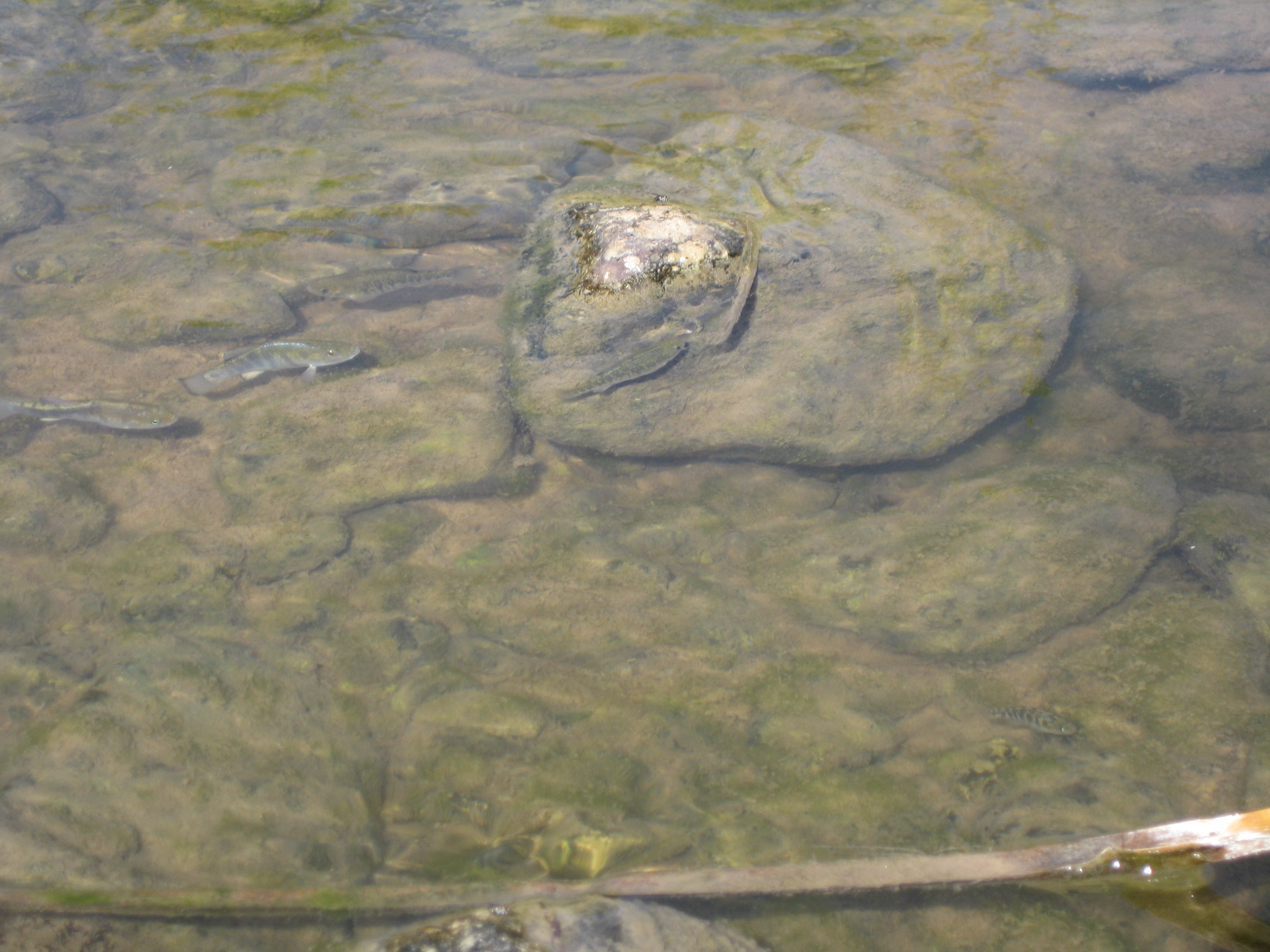

Conservation status
- Critically Imperiled (NatureServe)

Scientific classification
- Kingdom: Animalia
- Phylum: Chordata
- Class: Actinopterygii
- Order: Cyprinodontiformes
- Family: Cyprinodontidae
- Genus: Cyprinodon
- Species: C. nevadensis
- Subspecies: C. n. amargosae

Trinomial name
- Cyprinodon nevadensis amargosae R. R. Miller

= Amargosa River pupfish =

Subspecies of fish

The Amargosa River pupfish (Cyprinodon nevadensis amargosae) is a member of a pupfish species complex which inhabits the watershed of ancient Lake Manly (present day Death Valley in California, USA). Currently, the species inhabits two disjunct perennial reaches of the lower Amargosa River. The upstream portion is near Tecopa and passes through the Amargosa Canyon. The lower portion is northwest of Saratoga Springs, just at the head (southern inlet) of Death Valley, where the Amargosa River turns north to enter the valley. This species is typically found in warm, shallow waters with submerged vegetation.

These diminutive fish subsist on cyanobacteria and algae which are abundant in their habitat. However, they have been known to feed on smaller invertebrates, including mosquito larvae and copepods. This feeding strategy allows them to thrive in environments where other food sources may be scarce. In a study conducted over several seasons, detritus made up the majority of this species' stomach (65% in October, 90% in November) while algae, vascular plants, and animals were minimal. The pupfish's selection of food seems to be dictated by biological and physiochemical restrictions placed on the food supply based on their extreme environment. Smaller invertebrates as food seemed to have greater importance in other seasons.

They have a life history adapted to the vagaries of the intermittent nature of their environment. They have a very short generation time (<1 year and usually just a few months), which allows for rapid exploitation of flooded portions of the streambed in years of high flow.

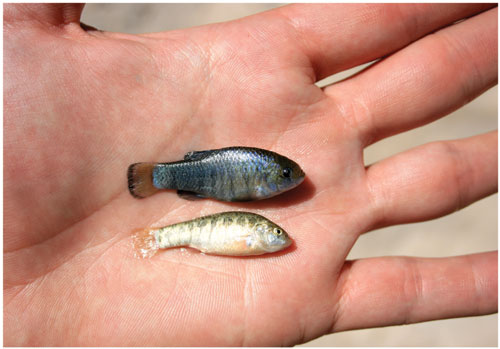
Male and female Amargosa river pupfish (Cyprinodon nevadensis). The male is darker and larger than the female.

The Amargosa River pupfish is a small fish, typically measuring no more than 2 inches (50 mm) in length as an adult. It has a compressed body with a small terminal mouth. with a complete row of tricuspid teeth and rounded fins aiding in maneuverability within their habitat. Their streamlined body shape reduces drag, allowing the fish to conserve energy as it moves through the water, an essential adaptation in an environment where resources can be scarce. The coloration is typically bluish or greenish with a lighter underside, often exhibiting dark spots and markings on the body and fins. These markings help the pupfish blend with the rocky and sandy riverbeds, providing camouflage from predators. Males often show more vivid colors, especially during breeding seasons, compared to females' muted colors. The breeding season occurs during the summer months when the water temperature is higher and food is most abundant.

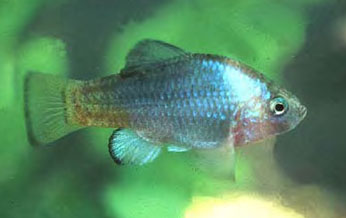
Desert pupfish (Cyprinodon macularis) often mistaken for the Amargosa river pupfish

The Amargosa River pupfish may be confused with other species in the Cyprinodon genus, such as the Desert pupfish (Cyprinodon macularius) and the Pahrump Valley pupfish (Cyprinodon nevadensis). These species share similar habitats and physical characteristics but can be distinguished by differences in coloration and size as the Amargosa River pupfish tends to have a more elongated body compared to some of its relatives.

== Distribution ==
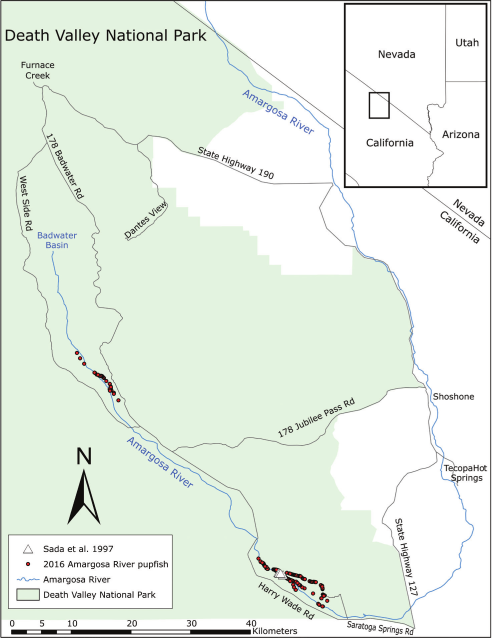
Distribution of Amargosa River pupfish in Death Valley, CA

The Amargosa River pupfish is found in two distinct areas of perennial flow along the lower Amargosa River in Death Valley, California with a dry stretch of riverbed measuring 16 km between them. The upstream range is near Tecopa, and the downstream range is near Saratoga Springs. Pupfish inhabit areas of the Tecopa Bore habitat where temperatures can exceed 36 °C, although they generally prefer temperatures closer to 30 °C. Water temperatures in the Amargosa River vary seasonally from 10 °C to 38 °C, with possible near-freezing conditions during extreme winters. Younger pupfish are more tolerant of higher temperatures than adults and typically inhabit the warmer, shallower waters (around 5 cm deep) near the shore, where they are able to find refuge from predators and reduced competition for food.

The overall abundance of the Amargosa River pupfish is low due to limited distributions, making conservation efforts critical for their survival. Habitat fragmentation and water diversion for agricultural purposes have significantly affected the species' range. The pupfish's preference for shallow, warm waters means that even the slightest alterations to the water flow can reduce suitable habitats threatening the already limited populations. Additionally, invasive species such as non-native fish and aquatic plants further increase these challenges by competing for resources and altering ecosystem dynamics. A survey conducted in 2010 reported that populations of non-native red swamp crayfish (Procambarus clarkii) and western mosquito fish (Gambusia affinis) were captured in much greater numbers compared to native pupfish, especially in areas heavily infested with non-native saltcedar (Tamarix ssp.). Based on the survey, it was hypothesized that the invasion of saltcedar could result in a decrease in native species. While saltcedar is a non-native invasive species in the Amargosa River, restoration efforts should prioritize other aquatic invasives such as cattail and common reed because they are disrupting flow velocities and harming pupfish populations.

== Breeding ==
During the breeding season, males' brighter colors may become more intense due to hormonal changes, which not only attract potential mates but also communicate territorial dominance. Juveniles are typically more muted in coloration and lack the distinctive markings present in adults. They are generally more transparent than adults as well. This transparency helps juveniles avoid detection by predators, as they are vulnerable during this early stage of life. Recent research has found that male Amargosa River pupfish change their coloration during the breeding season due to a combination, of social, and hormonal factors. Influences such as water temperature and light levels, along with competition for mates, all play an essential role in the males' shift in coloration. When the water temperature increases and there is a greater abundance of light, the males' colors become more vibrant, which helps attract a mate and establish dominance over the other males. Thyroid hormones are crucial in this process because they not only support reproduction but also help the fish quickly adapt to changes in their environment. These hormones regulate their metabolism, which boosts the males' coloration during breeding, providing them with the extra energy required for their flamboyant displays. Environmental temperature plays an important role in regulating the pupfish breeding.

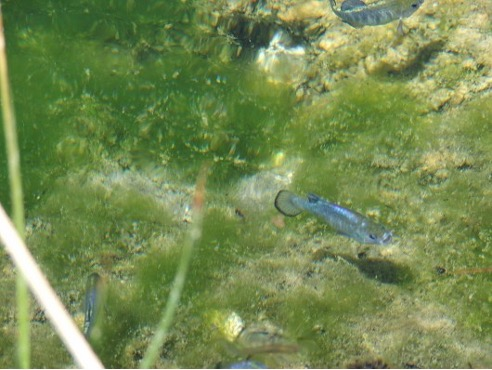
Vibrant coloration display during breeding season

The Amargosa River pupfish have a short breeding season that occurs during the warmer months and engage in oviparous reproduction, with females laying eggs in shallow vegetated areas of the river bed. The optimal temperature for the pupfish egg production is approximately 24 °C to 32 °C. When the temperature rises above 32 °C, the chances of the pupfish producing viable eggs decreases, leading to majority of the eggs lacking yolk or underdeveloped chorions. At 34 °C or higher, reproduction may not occur. Males exhibit territorial behavior during the breeding season, often displaying more vibrant colors to attract females. Additionally, changes in water quality such as fluctuations in pH and salinity also impact how intensely the males display their colors. The brighter coloration in males is thought to be a form of sexual selection, signaling fitness to potential mates while simultaneously deterring rival males. Amargosa River pupfish largely breed in loose aggregations where males show little aggression and regularly court females. Some males however, establish and defend reproductive territories in the warm, shallow edges of the river. These territorial males are aggressive and infrequently court females. The typical lifespan of the Amargosa River pupfish is quite short, generally around 1 year. These pupfish reach sexual maturity in a few months at around 30 mm long due to their rapid lifecycle. The age and growth of this species can be estimated using their otoliths, which are small ear bones that can be analyzed for growth rings similar to tree rings. The Cyprinodon genus is known for its diverse adaptations to extreme environments, which is evident in its physical characteristics and behavior.

== Biology and morphology ==
The Amargosa River pupfish demonstrates incredible adaptability to extreme conditions including high temperatures, salinity fluctuations, and low oxygen levels in its habitat. These conditions are characteristic of the harsh environments within the Amargosa River system, especially in the hot desert climate of Death Valley. This pupfish species can withstand water temperatures ranging from near freezing to over 104 °F (40 °C) in summer, temperatures that would be lethal to many other fish species. In addition to the temperature, the Amargosa River pupfish exhibits a remarkable capacity to survive in waters with varying levels of salinity. Salinity is a crucial environmental factor that influences the distribution and survival of aquatic organisms. This species are known as euryhaline fish, enabling them to withstand changing salt concentrations. Their adaptability is facilitated by the fish's ability to regulate the osmotic balance within its cells, allowing it to cope with changes in salt concentration that occur due to evaporation or fluctuating river flow. Specialized cells in the gills and kidneys help the pupfish maintain homeostasis by excreting excess salt in highly saline conditions or conserving salts when freshwater levels increase.

In the slow-moving or stagnant waters of the Amargosa River, oxygen levels can drop significantly, especially during the summer. The Amargosa River pupfish have developed strategies to survive in low-oxygen environments. It can increase its reliance on anaerobic respiration, which does not require oxygen, for a short period of time. This species of fish also displays behavioral adaptations, such as moving to the water surface where oxygen concentration is higher or seeking cooler microhabitats where oxygen solubility is greater.

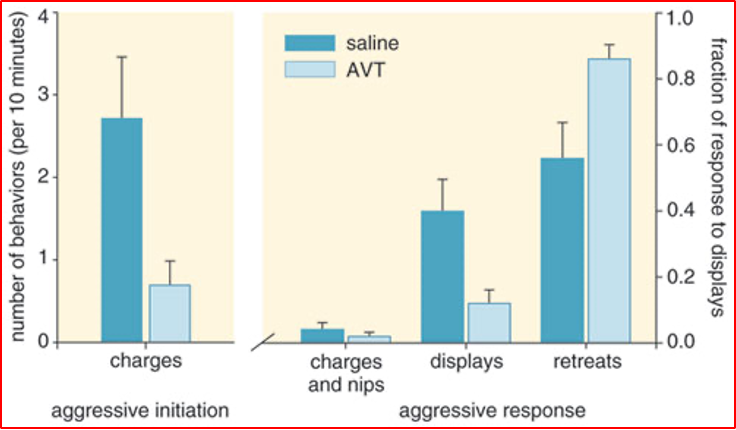
Aggressive initiation and response of Amargosa River pupfish with arginine vasotocin (AVT), a hormone that influences social behavior in Amargosa River pupfish.

The body shape, behavior, and even the brain of the pupfish are flexible so that its development is influenced by the environmental conditions early life. This flexibility is known as phenotype plasticity. In the case of pupfish, studies of how the environment influences phenotypic development are leading to new insights about how these fish respond to environmental change. Moreover, recent research has highlighted the role of arginine vasotocin (AVT), a hormone that influences social behavior and osmoregulatory function in Amargosa River pupfish. Variations in AVT expression among different populations throughout Death Valley suggest adaptive changes in aggression and osmoregulation. Experiments have shown that administering AVT reduces aggressive behavior in the male pupfish, both in laboratory settings and in the wild, indicating that AVT plays an important role in modulating social interactions. These adaptations make the Amargosa River pupfish an excellent subject for studying evolutionary mechanisms of resilience in extreme environments. Its survival strategies provide insights into how fish can rapidly adapt to harsh conditions, showcasing the effects of natural selection and genetic variability in isolated and stressful habitats. Studying these adaptations can also help researchers understand how other aquatic species might cope with environmental changes brought about by climate change, such as increasing temperatures and altering freshwater availability.

== Conservation status ==
The Amargosa River pupfish is listed as critically imperiled by Nature Serve and considered threatened under the California Endangered Species Act. The population decline is attributed to several factors, including groundwater extraction, habitat fragmentation, and invasive species. The introduction of non-native fish, such as mosquitofish, poses significant threats due to predation and competition for resources. Recent studies have shown that rising water temperatures due to climate change, not only diminish suitable habitats, but can also result in smaller fish sizes and altered body morphology. These morphological changes could further impact the species' survival by impacting their reproductive success and ability to compete for resources. For example, a significant decline in body mass has been observed, with males and females showing a 33.4% and 39.0% reduction, following temperature increases from climate change. Additionally, morphological changes have been discovered, such as partial or complete loss of paired pelvic fins in about 34% of the population. This fin loss can impair social behaviors like territorial defense, impacting reproductive success. Climate change is also worsening these threats, as increased temperatures and reduced water availability may further harm the already fragile habitats of the pupfish.

Conservation efforts focus on habitat restoration, groundwater management, and monitoring population trends to reduce the risks facing the species. Addressing temperature increases is crucial, as warmer waters accelerate metabolic rates, leading to reduced growth rates, and limiting the potential and resilience of the species. Understanding the physiological responses of fish to increased temperatures, and how these responses differ across populations is essential for predicting changes in fish communities as their habitats become warmer. It also helps whether the ability to adapt to varying temperatures could support species survival. Legal protections under federal and state laws aim to preserve critical habitats, while captive breeding programs have been proposed as a backup strategy to prevent extinction. Furthermore, researchers emphasize the need for adaptive management strategies that account for continuous temperature changes, incorporating prediction of future climate scenarios into conservation planning to ensure the survival of the Amargosa River pupfish. This species holds ecological significance as an indicator species for the health of the Amargosa River ecosystem.
