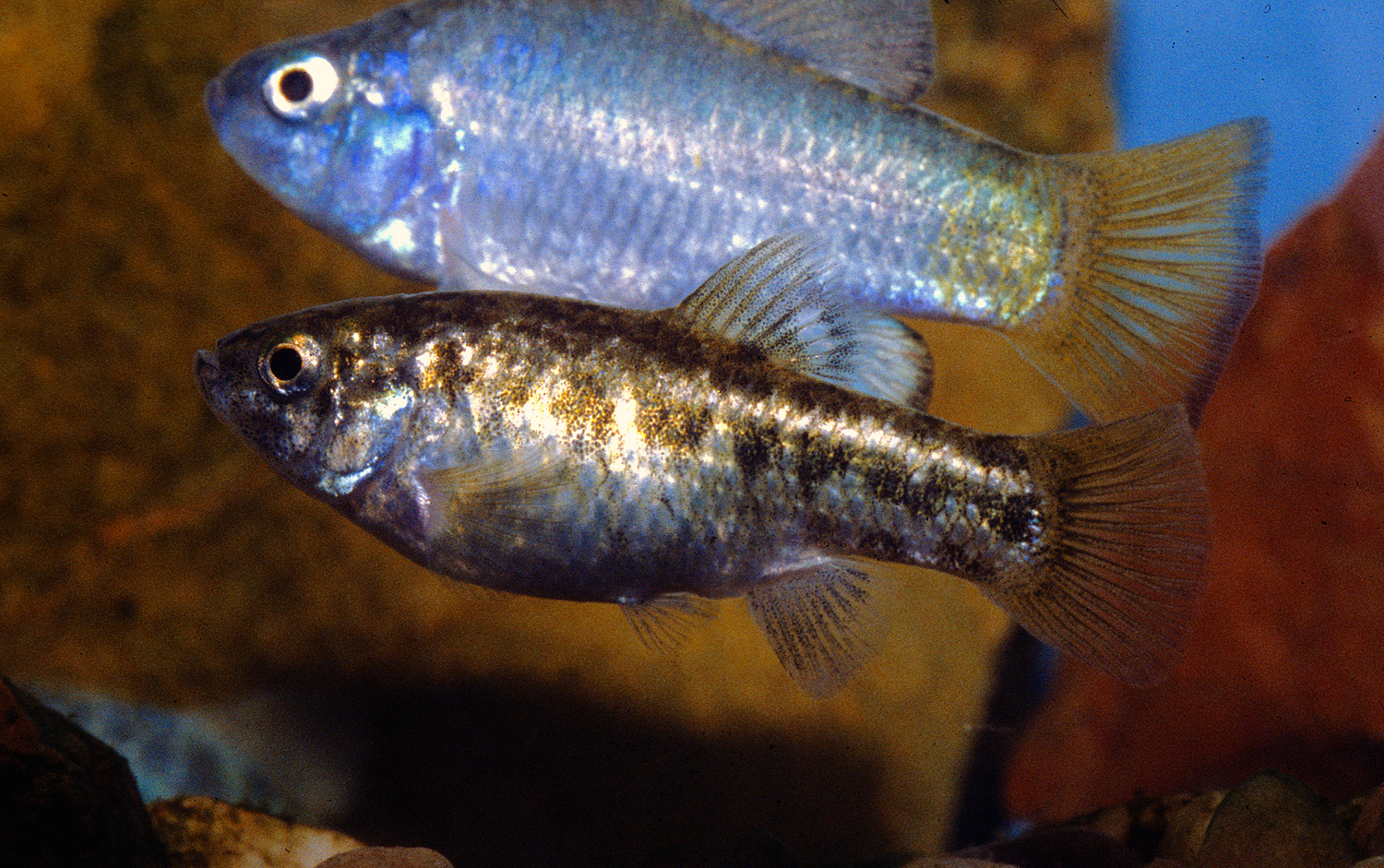

Conservation status
- Vulnerable (IUCN 3.1)

- Endangered (ESA)

Scientific classification
- Kingdom: Animalia
- Phylum: Chordata
- Class: Actinopterygii
- Order: Cyprinodontiformes
- Family: Cyprinodontidae
- Genus: Cyprinodon
- Species: C. macularius

Binomial name
- Cyprinodon macularius S. F. Baird & Girard, 1853

Synonyms
- Cyprinodon californiensis Girard, 1859; Lucania browni Jordan & Richardson, 1907; Cyprinodon browni (Jordan & Richardson, 1907); Cyprinodon sonoytae Peterson, 1993

= Desert pupfish =

Species of fish

The desert pupfish (Cyprinodon macularius) is a rare species of bony fish in the family Cyprinodontidae. It is a small fish, typically less than 7.62 cm (3 in) in length. Males are generally larger than females, and have bright-blue coloration, while females and juveniles are silvery or tan. A notable attribute of the desert pupfish is their ability to survive in environments of extreme salinity, pH, and temperature, and low oxygen content. The desert pupfish mates in a characteristic fashion, wherein compatible males and females will come in contact and collectively jerk in an s-shape. Each jerk typically produces a single egg that is fertilized by the male and deposited in his territory. Breeding behavior includes aggressive arena-breeding and more docile consort-pair breeding.

The desert pupfish is a federally listed endangered species in the United States. The desert pupfish was once a common fish, but it is now extirpated from most of its historical natural range. The decrease in population has been a trend since the early 1900s due to habitat destruction and fragmentation. It has been, and continues to be, preyed upon and displaced by non-native fishes, such as tilapia. Currently, the desert pupfish occurs only in three drainage basins: the Salton Sea, California, the Colorado River Delta, Baja California, and in Sonora, Mexico. Historically, the desert pupfish occurred in the drainage basins of the Gila, Santa Cruz, San Pedro, and Salt, and lower Colorado River. The range stretched from Arizona to the Gulf of California and Sonora.

== Taxonomy and phylogeny ==
Cyprinodon macularius was first described by Spencer Baird and Charles Girard in 1853. Originally, it was considered to be made up of three subspecies: the nominal desert pupfish (Cyprinodon macularius macularius), the Quitobaquito pupfish (Cyprinodon macularius eremus) and the undescribed Monkey Spring pupfish (Cyprinodon sp.).

The study of mitochondrial DNA variation between different populations of pupfish traditionally considered as C. macularius provide the basis for the species distinction between C. macularius and C. eremus. The mtDNA haplotypes of the pupfish endemic to the Rio Sonoyta Basin/Quitobaquito Springs and the pupfish endemic to the Salton Sea/Lower Colorado River Basin suggest sustained, independent evolutionary histories. Furthermore, the differences between the frequency of inherited alleles of each species are significant enough to suggest that these individuals became separate species about 100,000 years ago. As a result, the three subspecies have been reclassified as three distinct species: the desert pupfish (C. macularius), the Sonoyta (Quitobaquito) pupfish (C. eremus), and the Santa Cruz (Monkey Spring) pupfish (C. arcuatus), with the Santa Cruz pupfish being described in 2002.

== Description ==
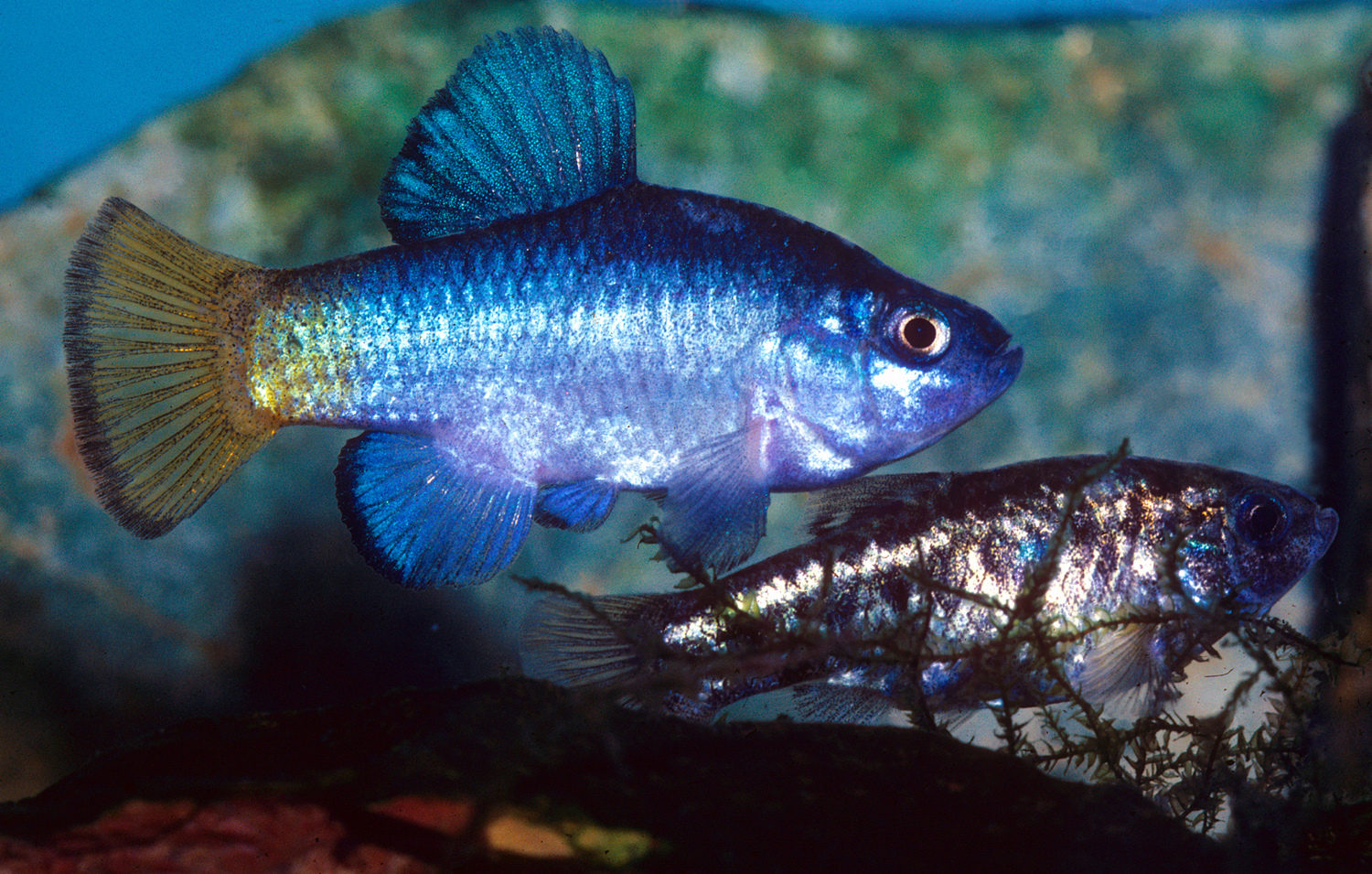
Pair

The desert pupfish is a small fish that is typically less than 7.62 cm (3 in) long; males are larger than females and generally have more vivid markings, especially during breeding seasons. Females and juveniles typically have tan or olive backs and silvery sides with narrow, dark vertical bars situated laterally. These bars are often interrupted to give the impression of a disjunct, lateral band. During mating season, males become bright blue on the dorsal portion of the head and sides, and yellow or orange on the caudal fin and posterior caudal peduncle. The dorsal profile of the desert pupfish is smoothly rounded, while its body is thickened and laterally compressed. The desert pupfish has a protruding mouth equipped with tricuspid teeth.

== Habitat and distribution ==
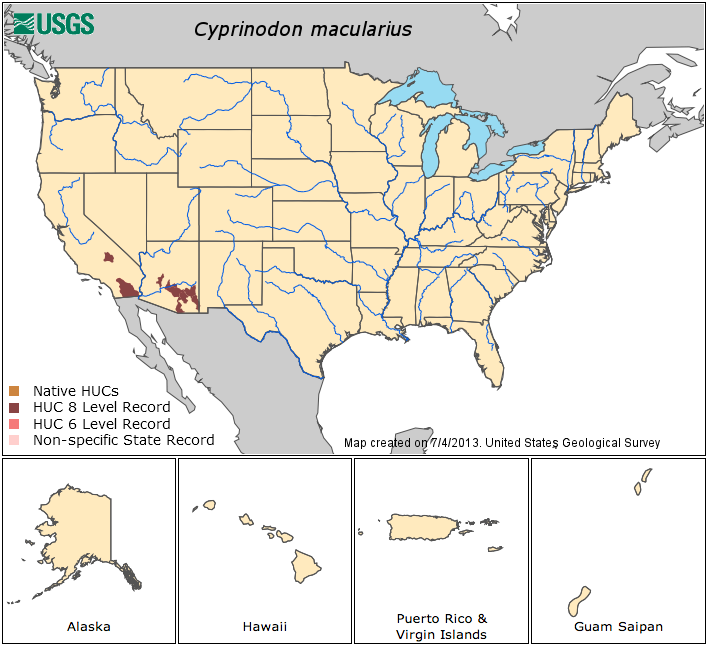
U.S. distribution of C. macularius.

The desert pupfish is found in shallow waters of desert springs, small streams, and marshes below 1,524 m (5,000 ft) in elevation. The species can tolerate high salinities, water temperatures, and lower oxygen content than most fish, and will occupy habitats inhospitable to invasive fish. Pupfish typically prefer clear waters with either rooted or unattached aquatic plants, restricted surface flow, or sand-silt substrates, and will do well if their habitats have little vegetation apart from mats of benthic algae.

The distribution of the desert pupfish historically ranged from the lower Colorado River in Arizona and California to the Gulf of Mexico and onto its delta in Sonora and Baja California. Specifically, the desert pupfish occurred the Salton Sink basin in California; the Gila River basin in Arizona and Sonora, including the Gila, Santa Cruz, San Pedro, and Salt Rivers; the Rio Sonoyta in Arizona and Sonora; Puerto Peñasco, Sonora; and the Laguna Salada basin in Baja California. A large population of desert pupfish is protected at the Cibola National Wildlife Refuge. Due to both habitat destruction and species reclassification, however, the desert pupfish has a smaller territory distribution than previously thought.

As of 2010, naturally occurring populations of the desert pupfish are restricted in the United States to two tributaries and various shoreline pools and irrigation drains of the Salton Sea in California. In Mexico, the desert pupfish is scattered along the Colorado River Delta and the Laguna Salada basin. Collectively, there are 11 known populations of extant wild desert pupfish within the United States and Mexico. Attempted reintroductions have yielded 16 transplanted populations in Arizona, as well as 46 captive or refuge populations in Arizona, California, and Mexico.

== Diet ==
Pupfish are omnivores that forage in shallow water during early morning and late evening; they will move out of the shallows during the day when water temperatures may rise to 36 °C or higher to avoid heat death. The rate of surface foraging drops when water temperatures fall below 21 °C. Pupfish show some dietary preference towards nektonic organisms, going so far as to suppress or even eliminate local populations of mosquitoes. In the absence of mosquito prey, pupfish will consume benthic chironomid midges (both from substrate and from midwater when midges attempt to come to the surface), algae, small invertebrates, aquatic crustaceans, aquatic insect larvae, snails, detritus, and occasionally the eggs and young of its own species.

Exposed eggs are typically and readily eaten by other pupfish of the same species if not laid in an inconspicuous area, while mobile fry are ignored unless adults are very hungry. Furthermore, though pupfish may engage in filial cannibalism, males have been observed using olfactory cues to distinguish between eggs fertilized by themselves and those fertilized by other males. This has been considered analogous to the defensive behavior of avian victims of nest parasitism, wherein they will reject alien eggs. Similarly, pupfish eggs are typically only consumed by females that do not spawn them; these two factors, coupled with the fact that males show sexual preference towards larger (and therefore more fecund) females, are consistent with parents maximizing the chances of offspring survival.

== Biology and ecology ==
=== Motor patterns ===
The desert pupfish exhibits characteristic movements that can be grouped into various units as follows:

- Meandering—the female swims somewhat aimlessly in midwater or near the surface in slightly exaggerated movements.
- Nuzzling—the male swims directly under the meandering female, tilting his body upwards while keeping his head against or near the abdominal region of the female.
- Contacting—as the female moves slowly, the male stays beside and slightly behind her, typically maintaining contact either side-to-side or snout-to-side.
- Tilting and nipping—while swimming slowly, the female tilts her body downwards towards the substrate; from the tilted position, the female takes up a mouthful of substrate and drops her body to the bottom of the habitat. The female then expels the substrate and may nip two or three more times from the horizontal position. This action has been interpreted as food-seeking, and has been observed in other species as a signal for the moment of spawning.
- Halting and sidling—after nipping, the female will halt, whereupon the male will swim forward and laterally against the female, thrusting the area at the base of his anal fin against the posterior line of the female's abdomen.
- S-shaping—seen from above, the pupfish forms an s-shape. Typically, both male and female will couple in parallel s-shapes on the bottom of their habitat during mating.
- Wrapping—while both fish maintain an s-shape, the male will wrap his anal fin around the posterior area of the female's belly, forming a crude cup beneath her vent.
- Jerking—while still in an s-shape, the pupfish will jerk its head in the opposite direction it is situated in, causing a contraction that reverses the direction of the s-shape. During jerking, the female will extrude an egg, while the male presumably releases his sperm.
- Patrolling—the territorial male will swim forwards in small, fast spurts, then stop abruptly before swimming in another direction. The male will patrol his entire territory in this way.
- Facing and eyeing—two territorial males will approach each other head-on and face each other eye-to-eye with one to one-half body length between them.
- Arching—the pupfish will form a c-shape with the concave side facing the opponent fish.
- Tail beating—a competing male will beat his caudal towards the opponent fish, causing the beating fish to swing away from its opponent.
- Circling—two fish will circle each other at high speeds in a head-to-tail orientation; this is likely due to each fish simultaneously attempting to charge into the flank of its respective opponent, while dodging the charge of the other by turning.
- Fleeing—a fleeing pupfish will swim rapidly towards cover, or, in its absence, towards the water's surface.
- Escaping—a pupfish will dive into the substrate of its habitat and remain motionless.

=== Reproduction ===
The breeding season of the desert pupfish typically occurs during early spring and into winter when water temperatures exceed about 20 °C. Under conditions of abundant food and suitable temperature, the desert pupfish may become sexually mature as early as six weeks of age. Though they may start to breed during their first summer, most pupfish do not reproduce until their second. Breeding behavior includes both territorial arena-breeding (high aggression) and consort-pair breeding (low aggression). The former occurs in large habitats with high primary productivity, limited breeding substrates, and high population density, and it is the most common; the latter occurs in habitats with low primary productivity, abundant breeding substrates, and low population density.

During the breeding season, male pupfish establish and actively patrol and defend individual territories that are typically less than 1 meter deep and 1–2 meters in area; these territories vary in size based on individual fish size, density of other male pupfish, and water temperature, and are associated with small structures or incongruities of substrate. Adult females will swim in loose schools and forage inconspicuously. When a female is ready to spawn, she will leave the school to enter the territory of an attractive male, and the mating process described above will commence.

Temperature plays a significant factor in egg production. The most optimal temperature for eggs to be produced typically occurred at a constant temperature of 24–32 °C and a fluctuating temperature of 32–28 and 36–28 °C. Additionally, the quality of eggs was affected by temperature, with temperature and yolk diameter having an inverse relationship. The salinity the egg is placed in also has an effect on reproductive performance. The most optimal reproductive performance occurred at 10% salinity and decreased when above or below 10%.

=== Breeding ===
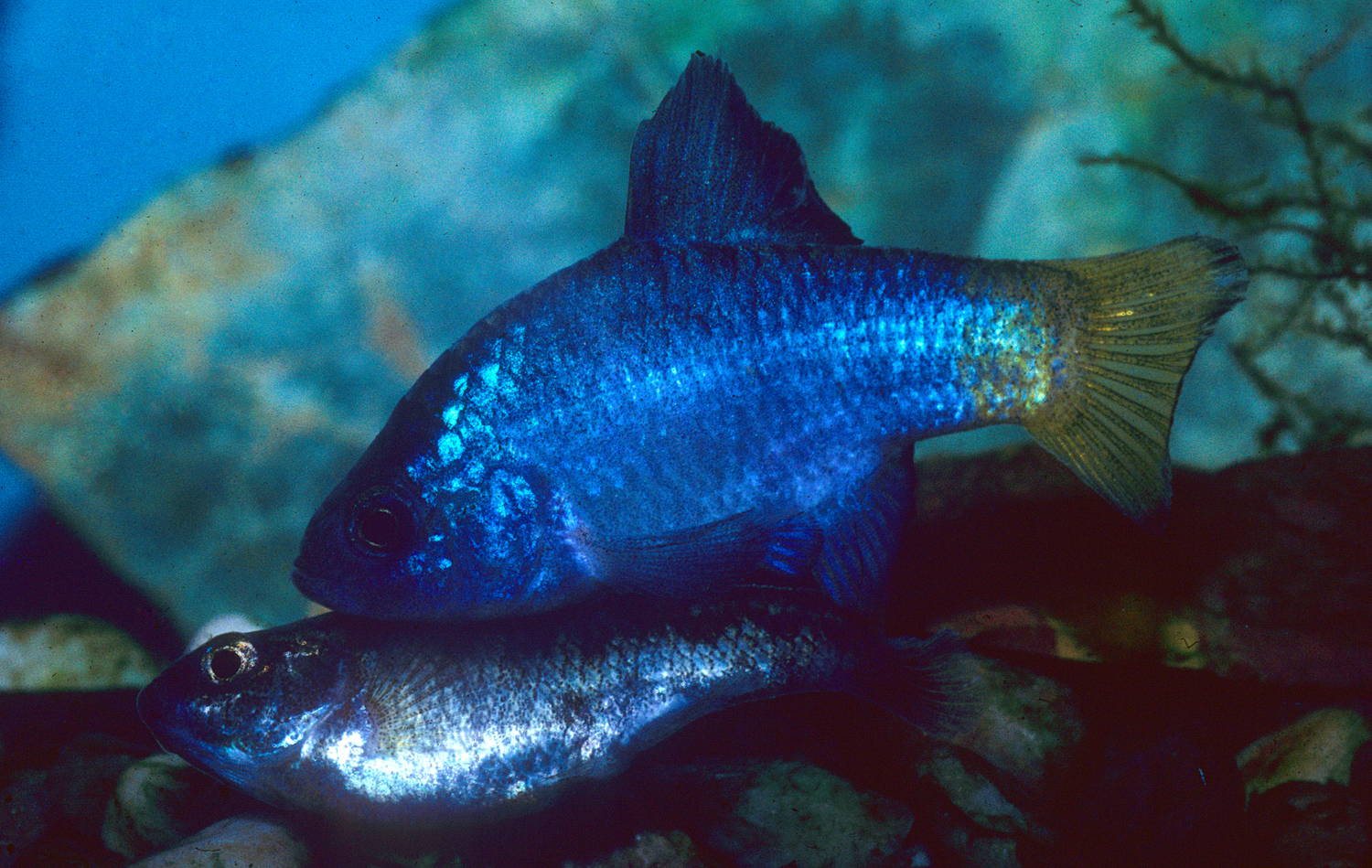
Desert pupfish initiating breeding

The reproductive behavior of the desert pupfish occurs in a characteristic fashion. Typically, males remain in their territory, while females, either alone or in groups, visit them: this is characteristic of arena-breeding. If a single female enters his territory, spawning occurs immediately; however, if multiple females are present, the male will swim from one female to the next until the proper response is given, whereupon spawning will occur. Females out of oestrus will continuously forage. Occasionally, a male from a neighboring territory will rush to the side of the female opposite the resident male and spawn with the pair.

When a female is ready to spawn, she will typically nip and tilt every 3 to 5 seconds. At this point, the male will immediately contact and attempt to sidle the female. After the third to fifth nip, the female will halt, allowing the male to fully sidle. Sidling by the male causes the female to form an S-shape, which causes the male to also form an S-shape and concurrently wrap his anal fin around the female's vent. After the female is wrapped, both fish jerk; jerking typically causes the female to release one egg, while ostensibly causing the male to fertilize said egg. Though the pair usually separates to leave one fertilized egg in the substrate, the female will very occasionally immediately form an S-shape and both fish will again perform the jerking sequence.

Spawning lasts from 30 minutes to 2 hours, with larger females spawning more than smaller females. Typically, the last coupling of the pupfish is the most prolonged, and several eggs are laid in succession. After copulation, both fish lie in the substrate, and after about 2 seconds, the male will contact the female again. If the female is finished spawning, she will flee in a "panicky" style with the male in pursuit. This chase lasts for about 5 minutes before the male swims to the bottom and both fish begin foraging.

== Extreme conditions ==
C. macularius are euryhaline and eurythermal, tolerating temperatures between approximately 4º and 45 °C and salinities ranging from 0 to 70 parts per thousand, exceeding the tolerances of virtually all other freshwater fish. The desert pupfish can also survive dissolved-oxygen concentrations as low as 0.13 ppm. The desert pupfish has been noted to be more abundant in environments with high vegetative cover, pH and salinity, and low dissolved oxygen and sediment factors, thus suggesting that living in extreme conditions allows them to survive in environments that are hostile to invasive or nonnative fish.

== Management factors ==
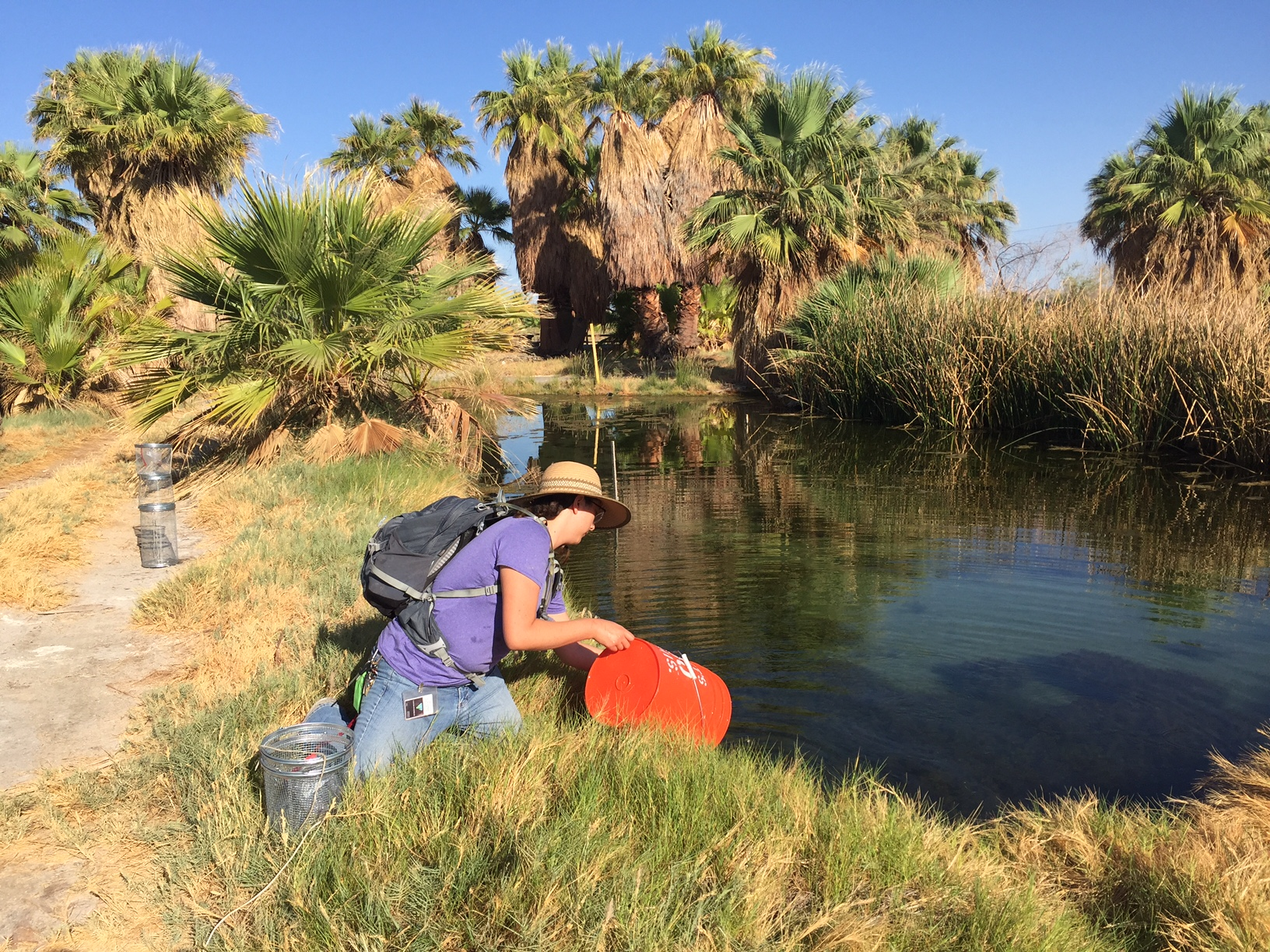
In the Dos Palmas Preserve, desert pupfish are released into a refugium.

While the desert pupfish contains a remarkable tolerance to extreme conditions, the species is listed as endangered as of 1986. The desert pupfish has been the focus of many conservation studies and attempts. Beginning in the late 1800s, the disappearance of the fish has been associated to the increase of human activities. It is considered Critically Imperiled by NatureServe.

Specifically, the threats to desert pupfish survival include the destruction of habitat, including loss and/or degradation of habitat through groundwater pumping and water diversion; contamination from agricultural return flows and other contaminants; physical changes in water quality; and pesticide run-off. In addition to these anthropogenic effects, desert pupfish have also been threatened by disease and predation due to invasive and nonnative species. The most recent decline of desert pupfish have shown to be correlated with environmental competition, predation and behavioral activities that interfere with reproduction, though the direct effects of these factors are unknown.

Various management factors have been suggested as beneficial towards saving the desert pupfish, including the control and management of exotic and invasive species in pupfish habitats; the maintenance of water levels, quality, and the proper functioning condition of ponds, springs, and drains; the restoration and enhancement of degraded habitat; and the establishment of large primary refuge populations for each group of wild C. macularius. The reintroduction of the desert pupfish to wild habitats has been moderately successful, while the establishment of captive or refuge desert pupfish populations has been more fruitful. Water management has been largely cited as having the greatest impact on the survival of C. macularius.

== See also ==
- Pupfish
- Cyprinodon - Genus
- Death Valley pupfish, Salt Creek pupfish, Cyprinodon salinus
- Shoshone pupfish, Cyprinodon nevadensis shoshone
- Tecopa pupfish, Cyprinodon nevadensis calidae (extinct)
- Owens pupfish, Cyprinodon radiosus
- Devil's Hole pupfish, Cyprinodon diabolis
- Julimes pupfish, Cyprinodon julimes
