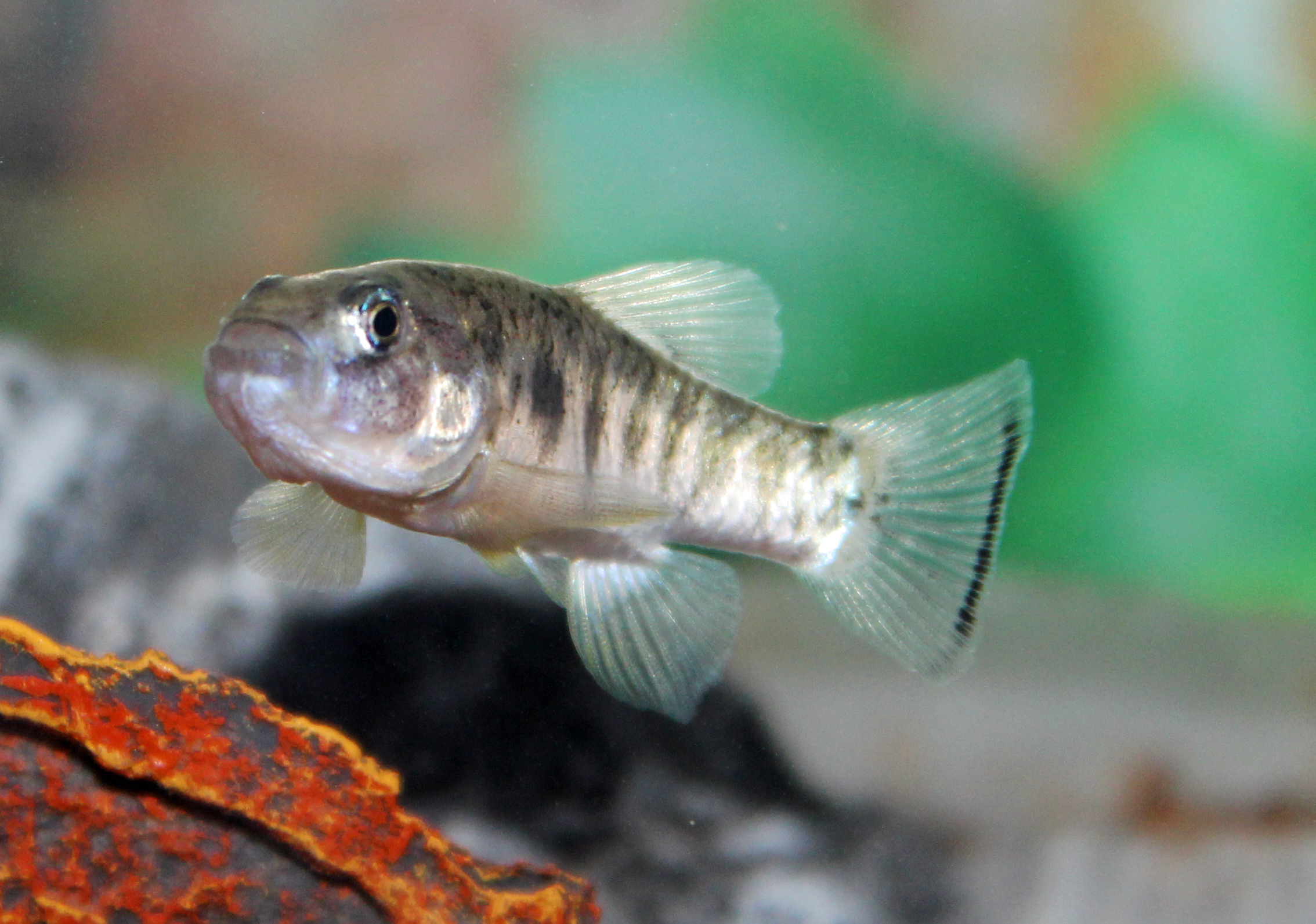
- Male in the aquarium

Conservation status
- Critically Endangered (IUCN 3.1)

Scientific classification
- Kingdom: Animalia
- Phylum: Chordata
- Class: Actinopterygii
- Order: Cyprinodontiformes
- Family: Cyprinodontidae
- Genus: Cyprinodon
- Species: C. julimes

Binomial name
- Cyprinodon julimes De la Maza-Benignos & Vela-Valladares, 2009

= Cyprinodon julimes =

Julimes pupfish

Species of fish

The Julimes pupfish (Cyprinodon julimes) (Spanish: cachorrito de Julimes) is a species of killifish in the family Cyprinodontidae. This pupfish is endemic to El Pandeño, a hot spring in Julimes, Chihuahua, Mexico, and it is adapted to life in water that reaches temperatures as high as 46 °C (114 °F). Consequently, it has been referred to as the "hottest fish in the world", although the closely related Cyprinodon pachycephalus can occur in somewhat warmer waters. Cyprinodon julimes was scientifically described in 2009 as similar to Cyprinodon eximius, but it has a bigger head, nearly one-third of its standard length.

== Appearance ==
Its body is deep, the dorsal and ventral profile is convex and the lower jaw exceeds the premaxilla. The dorsal fin is placed forward with respect to the pelvic fin. Females and young have reticulate patterns of dark and light silver-brownish bands of varying lengths and thickness over the flanks, as well as a conspicuous black spot or ocellus on the distal edge of the dorsal fin. Dominant males are bluish-green in color and show a black bar along the distal edge of the caudal fin.

Holotype.- UANL 18721 Collected by Ma.de Lourdes Lozano Vilano, Mauricio De la Maza Benignos, Ma. Elena García Ramírez, and the WWF group. February 25, 2007. Mature male 31.8 mm SL

Paratypes.- UANL 18721 (39 specimens); TNHC39729 (2 specimens); USNM 391634 (2 specimens); UMMZ 248729 (2 specimens). Same data as holotype.

== Distribution ==
The Julimes pupfish inhabits sections of "El Pandeño" hot spring system in the municipality of Julimes, Chihuahua. The system is located within the Middle Rio Conchos Basin and consists of a geothermal spring and a series of divergent canals. Until year 2011 C. julimes was restricted to an area of approximately 287.62 m^{2} (3,095.9 sq ft) that is part of the original system and a contiguous 437.19 m^{2} (4,705.9 sq ft) man-made blind canal, with depth ranging from 40 and 80 cm (1.3 and 2.6 ft) and constant water temperatures ranging between 38 and 46 °C (100 and 115 °F).

== Biology and behavior ==
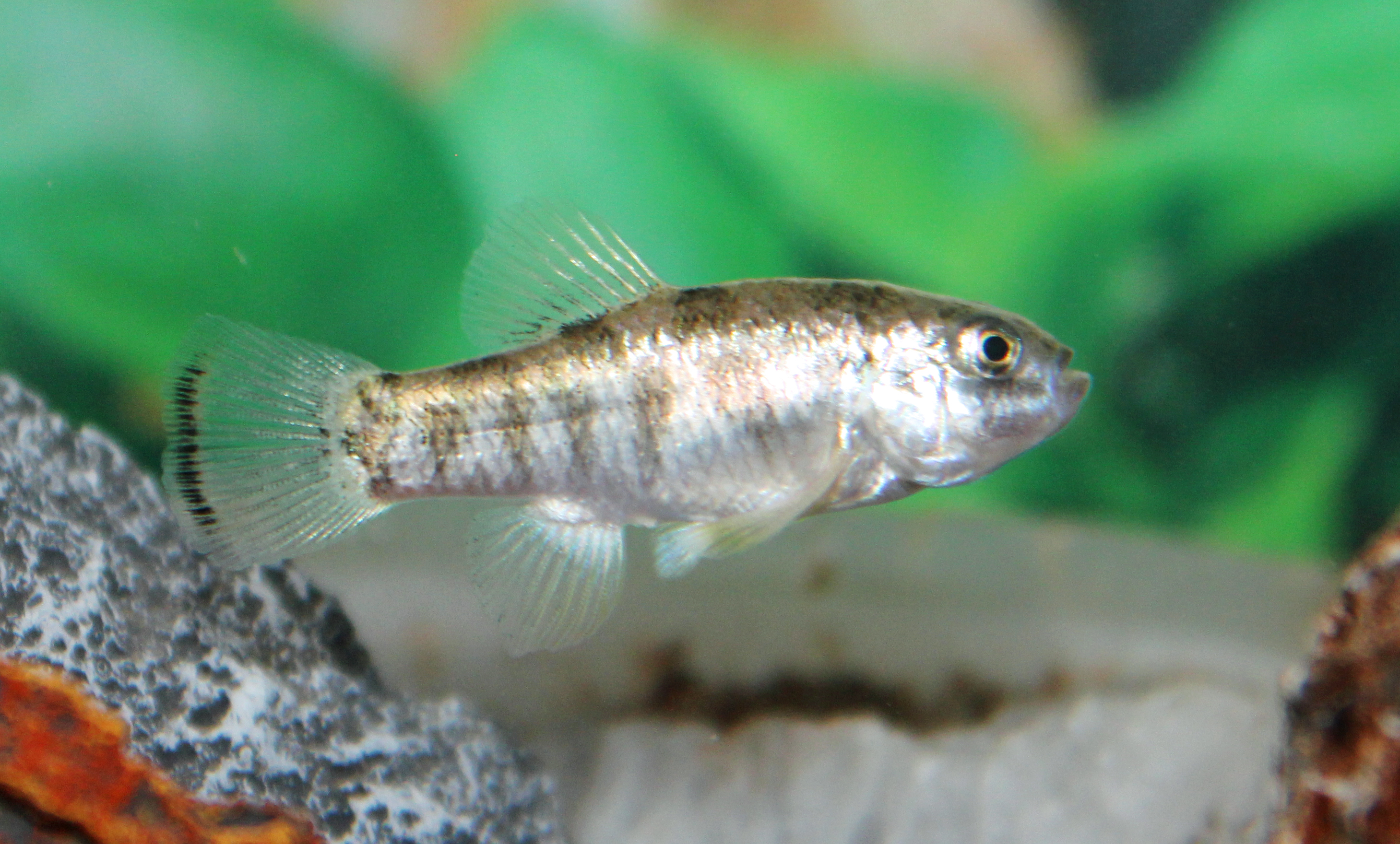
Male in an aquarium

Females and young group in small schools. They feed on detritus, perifitum (organic matter that collects on the surface of aquatic plants), and invertebrates — including the microendemic cochliopid Julimes springsnail Tryonia julimensis — and were often seen feeding on floating grass seeds. Dominant males establish territories of about 0.5 m (1.6 ft) in diameter around sunken branches, rocks or pieces of travertine from where they court passing females. Displays of aggression dissuade other males from entering their territories. Females that are ready to spawn cautiously enter the dominant male's territory, showing a courtship display directed at attracting the guarding male. Mating pairs come together, swimming, swirling and waving their bodies simultaneously as the female releases single eggs which are immediately fertilized by the male. The eggs adhere to roots, aquatic vegetation, rocks, travertine or sunken objects and are abandoned to their fate. The Julimes pupfish is considered to be the freshwater teleost that lives in the highest-temperature waters on the planet and is possibly also the vertebrate with the smallest known distribution range.

== Genetics ==
Effective population size was evaluated in 2013 and found to be critically low, indicating that "this pupfish is at genetic risk of extinction through loss of adaptive variance and, potentially, from inbreeding depression." Mitochondrial variation was also extremely low, and haplotype frequency was biased heavily in favor of one of two variants. The most common variant represented a divergent lineage exclusive to this pupfish; which supports recognition of Julimes pupfish as a valid and critically endangered species.

Additionally, twenty-five microsatellite loci for the Julimes pupfish were screened across 19 individuals. The number of alleles per locus ranged from 2 to 14, observed heterozygosity ranged from 0.105 to 0.947, and the probability of identity values ranged from 0.022 to 0.588. Tests for deviations from Hardy–Weinberg equilibrium (HWE) and for genotypic disequilibrium were conducted using GENEPOP v4.0 (Rousset 2008). After sequential Bonferroni correction for multiple comparisons, significant deviation from HWE expectations was observed at five loci. all locus-pairs conformed to expectations of genotypic equilibrium.

In accordance with conservation agreements between Pronatura Noreste A. C. and Amigos del Pandeño, A.C. test results are being used for long-term genetic monitoring under the ''Vital Signs'' program for the geothermal Julimes springs.

== Habitat ==
Within the hot spring, aquatic vegetation includes a single patch of cattail (Typha latifolia). Cyanobacteria mats predominate throughout the system, showing different species composition and forming mosaics of different colors, textures and growth types. Colors range from light green-blue to brownish-red. Faunal associates include a mix of endemic species in the following taxa: an undescribed poeciliid fish (Gambusia sp.) inhabiting the cooler sections of the system, the recently described cochliopid springsnail (Tryonia julimensis); and IUCN (CR) red listed sphaeromatid isopod (Thermosphaeroma macrura).

In January 2013, Amigos del Pandeño restored ~300 square metres (3,200 sq ft) of dried lower marsh habitat with support from Pronatura Noreste. The restored area, which more than doubled pupfish suitable habitat within the system was soon colonized by both pupfish and Gambusia sp. "Julimes".

== Conservation ==
The species is listed as Endangered (P) in the Mexican Endangered Species NOM-059-SEMARNAT-2010.

Since 1998, all water flow from "El Pandeño" has been allocated to 36 farmers grouped in the "San José de Pandos Irrigation Society" (SJPIS). The SJPIS farmers utilize an annual volume of 237,000 cubic metres (8,400,000 ft^{3}), or 50 lps, for both agriculture and recreation. Deeply concerned about the preservation of their water source, farmers of the SJPIS, together with Julimes residents, chartered in 2008 the grassroots non-profit organization "Amigos del Pandeño, A.C." or "Friends of El Pandeño". With support from partner NGOs, including Pronatura Noreste, A.C., Biodesert A.C., Profauna A.C. and the WWF-Chihuahuan Desert Program, "Amigos del Pandeño" began an Integrated Spring Management Program which seeks an optimal allocation of spring flows, recognizing the environment — and consequently the Julimes pupfish — as a user. The Program seeks to implement adaptive management strategies, build local capacities, generate water savings by upgrading irrigation systems, promote environmental education and develop public outreach, and intervene in water policy towards the implementation of environmental flows. By 2009, the Julimes project was already evolving into a freshwater conservation model for arid northern Mexico; initial efforts were showcased by the Mexican National Commission for Biodiversity (CONABIO) in the book The Natural Heritage of Mexico: One hundred success stories.

On September 28, 2010, the Mexican National Water Commission (CONAGUA) issued positive response to the request made by "Amigos del Pandeño", allowing them to use and manage the federal lands surrounding "El Pandeño" — officially known as "San José de Pandos" — thermal spring, for environmental purposes, for a ten-year term.

In May 2011, "Amigos del Pandeño" called for an initial "Vital Signs" planning workshop with the participation of scientists, experts, natural resource managers and specialists from universities, NGOs and the private sector, in order to develop a Science-based Management Plan for the spring system, and to begin to determine baselines to implement a "Vital Signs Monitoring Program". During the workshop, it was agreed that the purpose of a "Vital Signs Monitoring Program" would be early detection of environmental changes and providing an overview of the ecological consequences thereof in order to determine whether observations may dictate the need for changes in the management of the ecosystem and its natural resources. In April 2012, "Amigos del Pandeño", with support from SEMARNAT and the Chihuahua State Government, established "El Pandeño" as official Custodial Wildlife Conservation Management Unit "UMA-El Pandeño SDUE-UMA-EX-096-CHIH-12".

On November 30, 2013, an area of 368 ha (909 Acres) comprising a group of springs and irrigation canals, including "El Pandeño" hotspring was nominated Ramsar Site No. 2201: "Manantiales Geotermales de Julimes"(Geothermal Julimes Springs) by the Ramsar Convention on Wetlands on the basis of the unique ecosystems present, and the endemic organisms, including the Julimes pupfish, the isopod Thermosphaeroma macrura and the gastropod Tryonia julimensis, which have adapted to the extreme conditions which these systems present. The site is also a Grassland Priority Conservation Area, as it acts as a resting and feeding area for migratory birds traveling over the desert areas of Chihuahua State, which have very few water bodies especially during the dry winter season.

== Bibliography ==
- Gustavo Montejano, Itzel Becerra Absalón. "Caracterización del hábitat acuático asociado al pez Cyprinodon julimes" (PDF) (in Spanish). Laboratorio de Ficología, Facultad de Ciencias, UNAM.
- Mauricio de la Maza Benignos. "Evaluación del riesgo de extinción del cachorrito de Julimes" (in Spanish). Instituto Nacional de Ecología de México.
- De la Maza-Benignos, M., Lozano-Vilano, M. D. L., & Carson, E. W. (2014). "Conservation of desert wetlands and their biotas/Conservacíon de humedales desérticos y su biota". Museum of Southwestern Biology, Pronatura Noreste, and Universidad Autónoma de Nuevo León., ISBN 978-607-96611-0-6.
