= Amigos del Pandeño =

The Civil Association Amigos del Pandeño was created in 2008. It is a local non-profit conservation organization based in Julimes, Chihuahua, Mexico. Its mission is to conserve and protect the Natural Heritage of the people of Julimes, Chihuahua, with special emphasis on the micro-endemic aquatic fauna which distribution range is restricted to “El Pandeño” hotspring. Through its Technical Council, Amigos del Pandeño supports scientific research and a Vital Signs Monitoring Program that informs management decision-making processes that are related to the natural resources of Julimes.

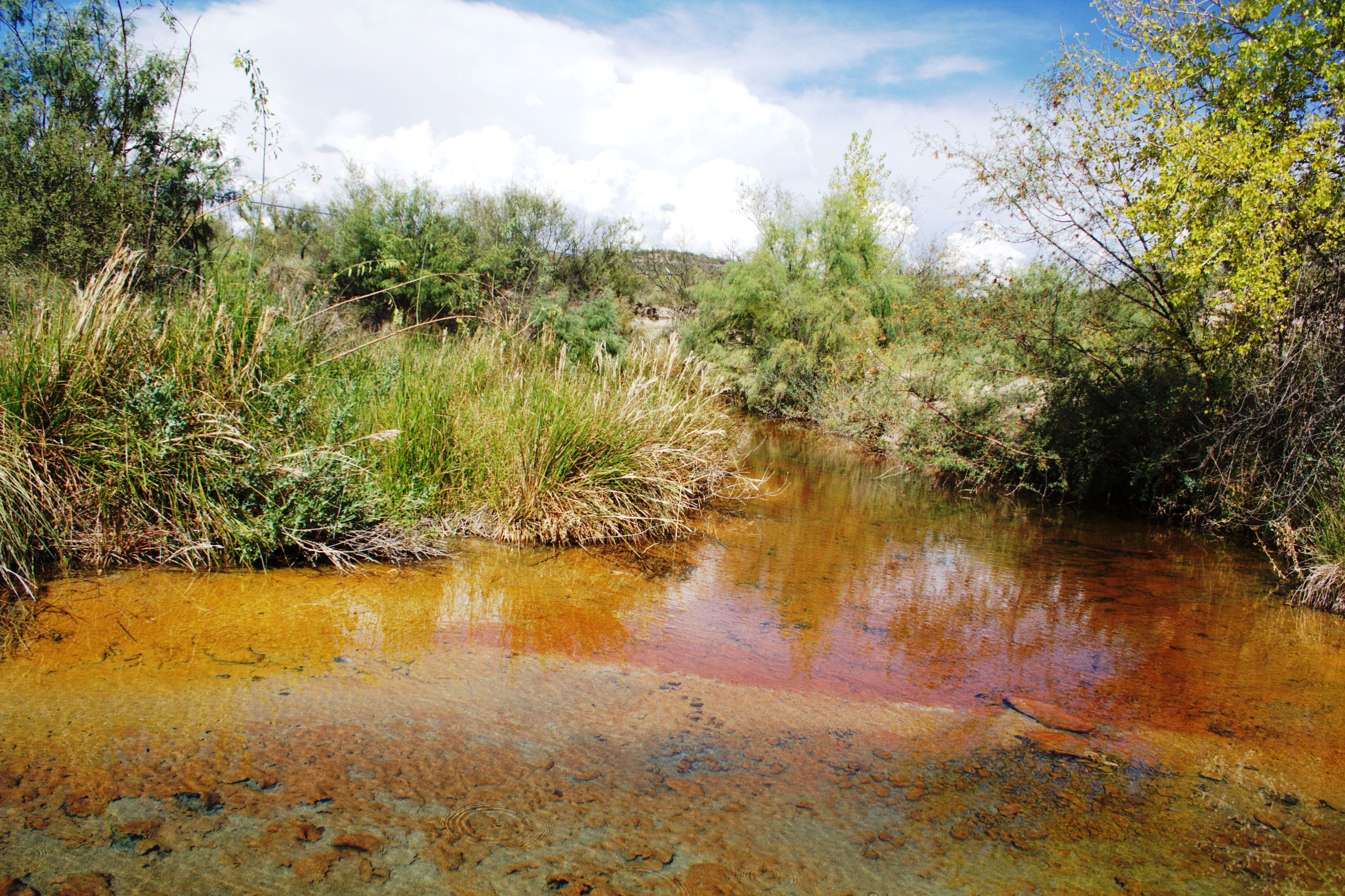
El Pandeño hotspring in Julimes, Chihuahua, Mexico

== Conservation approach ==
With support from partner NGOs including Biodesert, A.C., Pronatura Noreste, A.C., Profauna, A.C. and the World Wildlife Fund (WWF); Academic Institutions including UACH, UACJ, UANL, UNAM and UNM; Federal, State and Municipal governments; and the private sector including The Coca-Cola Company; Amigos del Pandeño promotes Sustainable Development mainly within the municipality of Julimes. The organization seeks to develop and implement Adaptive Natural Resources Management Strategies; enhance local capacities; promote environmental education among the inhabitants of Julimes; and to develop public outreach. Amigos del Pandeño also intervenes in water policy advocating for implementation of an environmental flow regime for the Rio Conchos Basin.

== Projects ==
In 2012, in partnership with Pronatura Noreste, the WWF and SEMARNAT, Amigos del Pandeño began implementing a water saving project which includes monitoring and upgrading of the Julimes irrigation network. In 2010, in partnership with Rotary International of Camargo, Chihuahua, the WWF-Chihuahuan Desert Program and the Municipality of Julimes, Amigos del Pandeño built a biofilter which treats raw sewage from 50 homes in Julimes. The water treatment system was designed as a primary treatment plant that avoids untreated sewage to flow into the Rio Conchos. Thanks to the use of earth worms as part of the treatment process the resulting sludge can be used as fertilizer, and effluent will be used for irrigation.

On September 28, 2010, the National Water Commission (CONAGUA) issued positive response to a request made by "Amigos del Pandeño", to allow them to hold the custody, for the use and management of the federal lands surrounding "El Pandeño" -officially known as "San Jose de Pandos"- thermal spring, for environmental purposes, for a ten years term. Since, Amigos del Pandeño is responsible for managing El Pandeño hotspring, home to the endangered Julimes pupfish (Cyprinodon julimes), the Julimes springsnail (Tryonia julimensis) and the Juimes isopod (Thermosphaeroma macrura) as part of the "Custodial Wildlife Conservation Management Unit “Unidades de manejo para la Conservación de la vida silvestre (UMA)-El Pandeño" SDUE-UMA-EX-096-CHIH-12" as well as monitoring its Vital Signs."

In 2014, it was declared a "Humedal de Importancia Internacional" (Wetland of International Importance), and Amigos del Pandeño continued their efforts in 2022 to conserve the springs against further over-extraction due to tourism and agriculture.

In 2025, the association was acknowledged by Senator Andrea Chávez (Chihuahua-Morena) in their efforts to preserve this unique environment.

== See also ==
- 2008 in the environment
