= Pronatura =

Pronatura may refer to:

- Pronatura México, Mexican environmental conservation group
  - Pronatura Noreste, one of six regional offices of Pronatura México
- Pro-Natura International, Paris-based environmental and poverty alleviation NGO
- Pro Natura (Switzerland), Switzerland's oldest environmental organisation
