= Sphaeroma papillae =

Scientific classification
- Kingdom: Animalia
- Phylum: Arthropoda
- Class: Malacostraca
- Order: Isopoda
- Family: Sphaeromatidae
- Genus: Sphaeroma
- Species: S. papillae

Binomial name
- Sphaeroma papillae (Bayliff, 1938)

Synonyms
- Exosphaeroma papillae Bayliff, 1938

Species of crustacean

Sphaeroma papillae is a species of isopod in the family Sphaeromatidae known from and potentially endemic to southern New England. It was described from Cold Spring Harbor on Long Island in 1938 and has since then been found in other locations on the north shores of Long Island and Cape Cod. It can be told from the similar Sphaeroma quadridentatum by the presence of two tubercles on the telson and the unserrated outer margin of the outer uropod branch. This species tends to be found in places of the intertidal zone where there is a direct influence with fresh water, such as seeps and pond outlets.
