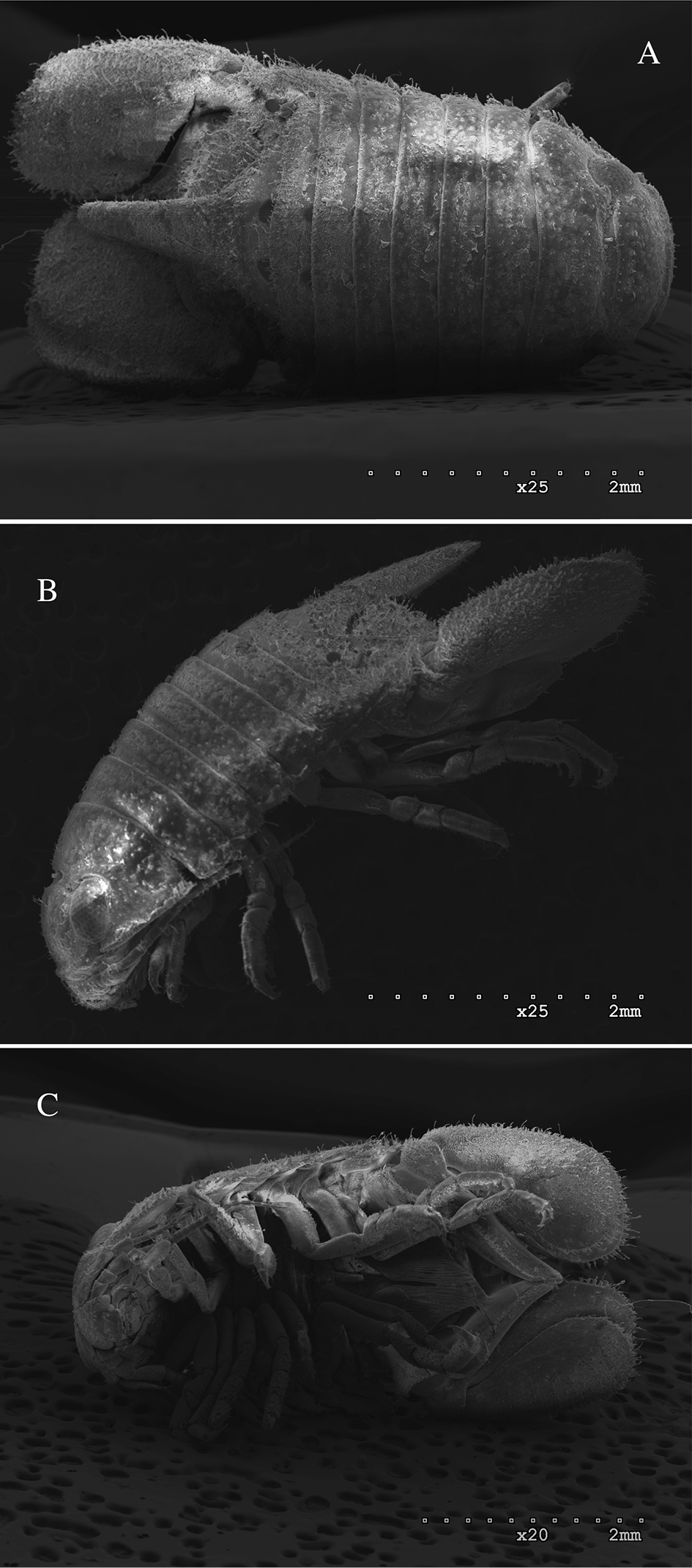

Scientific classification
- Kingdom: Animalia
- Phylum: Arthropoda
- Class: Malacostraca
- Order: Isopoda
- Family: Sphaeromatidae
- Genus: Dynoides
- Species: D. dentisinus

Binomial name
- Dynoides dentisinus Shen, 1929

= Dynoides dentisinus =

Species of crustacean

Dynoides dentisinus is a species of isopod in the family Sphaeromatidae.
