= Scutuloidea kutu =

Scientific classification
- Kingdom: Animalia
- Phylum: Arthropoda
- Class: Malacostraca
- Order: Isopoda
- Family: Sphaeromatidae
- Genus: Scutuloidea
- Species: †S. kutu

Binomial name
- †Scutuloidea kutu Stephenson & Riley, 1996

Synonyms
- Scutuloidea kuta Stephenson & Riley, 1996

Species of isopod

Scutuloidea kutu is a species of marine isopods in the family Sphaeromatidae, first described by Stephenson and Riley in 1996. The species is endemic to New Zealand, found in northern waters of the country, living in seaweeds, sponges and bryozoa in exposed reef formations.

== Description ==
Males are approximately 5–7 mm (0.20–0.28 in) in length, while females are approximately 4–5 mm (0.16–0.20 in). Females are often carried on the backs of the males of the species. Scutuloidea kutu can be visually distinguished from Scutuloidea maculata, a similar species in appearance which is also found in New Zealand waters, by colour, having a more spender body and eyes, as well as a pleotelson with no apical notch.

== Taxonomy ==
The species was first described by Anthony Brett Stephenson and Jenny L Riley in 1996. The name "kutu" (Māori for "lice") was chosen as a metaphor, as the species lives on seaweed (i.e. the hair of hinemoana, a personification of the ocean). The holotype was collected by Brett Stephenson on 9 July 1991, from just north of Russell, and is held by the Auckland War Memorial Museum.

== Distribution and habitat ==
Scutuloidea kutu is endemic to New Zealand, found in the northern waters of New Zealand, including the Bay of Islands, Piwhane / Spirits Bay and the Tasman Sea coast of the Waitākere Ranges. It lives in seaweeds, sponges and bryozoa in exposed reef formations, especially around red seaweeds such as Plocamium costatum and Osmundaria colensoi.
