= Dynoides serratisinus =

Scientific classification
- Kingdom: Animalia
- Phylum: Arthropoda
- Class: Malacostraca
- Order: Isopoda
- Family: Sphaeromatidae
- Genus: Dynoides
- Species: D. serratisinus

Binomial name
- Dynoides serratisinus Barnard, 1914

Species of crustacean

Dynoides serratisinus is a species of isopod in the family Sphaeromatidae. It is found in the Indian Ocean.
