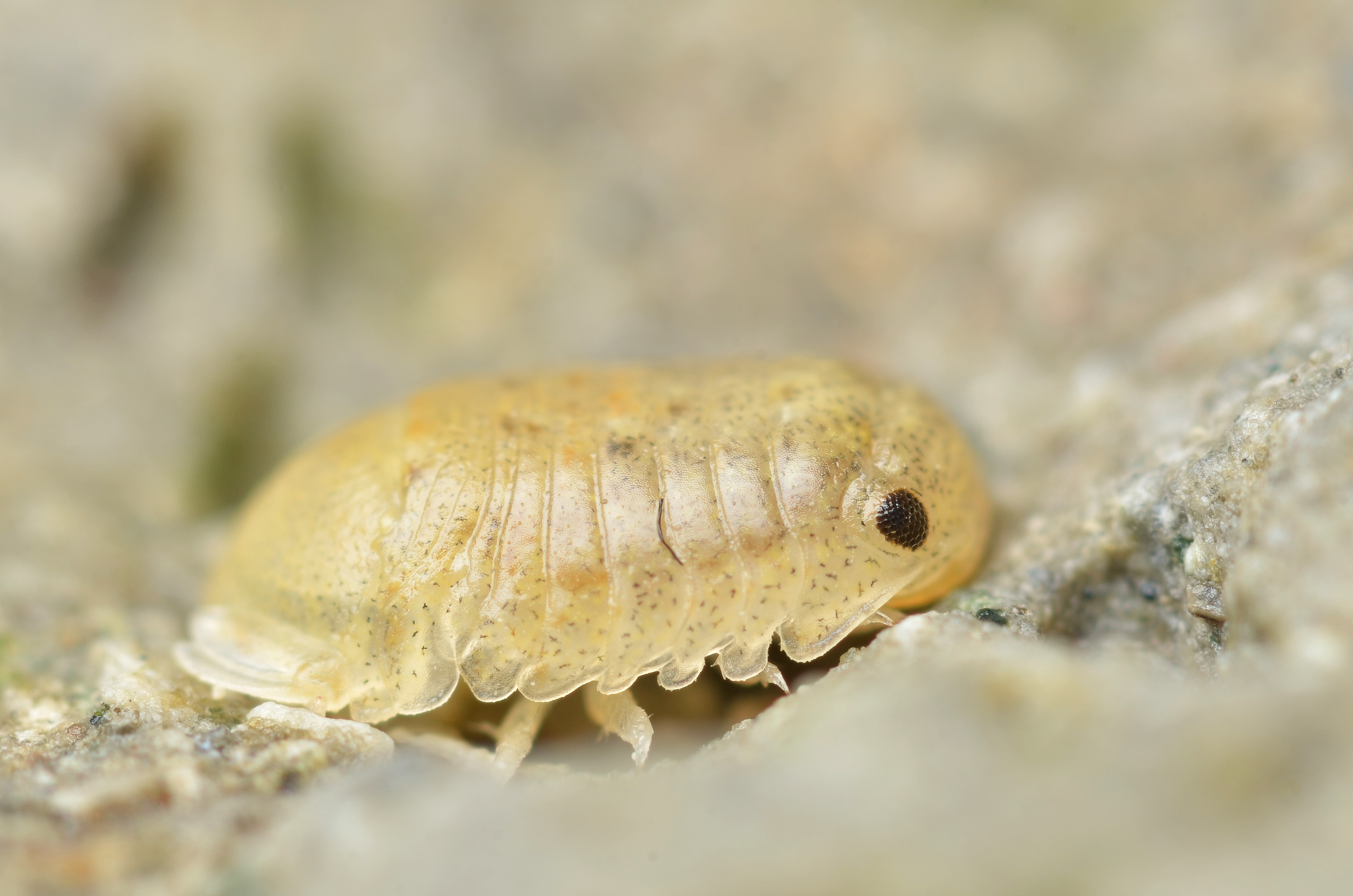
- A coastal Isopod of the family Sphaeromatidae (Malacostraca, Isopoda), from one of the genera formerly collectively known as "Sphaeroma" - Lekanesphaera rugicauda looks superficially similar. Locality : Wimereux, France

Scientific classification
- Kingdom: Animalia
- Phylum: Arthropoda
- Class: Malacostraca
- Order: Isopoda
- Family: Sphaeromatidae
- Genus: Lekanesphaera; Verhoeff, 1943

= Lekanesphaera =

Genus of crustaceans

Lekanesphaera is a genus of isopods in the family Sphaeromatidae. It was split off from Sphaeroma by Karl Wilhelm Verhoeff, 1943. The type species is L. monodi (formerly Sphaeroma monodi Arcangeli, 1934). Other well-studied species are L. glabella (Madera), L. rugicauda (Baltic), and L. hookeri (from Scotland and southeast Sweden to Italian lagoons). Because they inhabit intertidal zones such as estuaries, their adaptation to diurnal variations in factors such as salinity are often studied.

== Cladogram ==
Lekanesphaera cladogram from the Catalogue of Life

- Lekanesphaera
  - Lekanesphaera bocqueti
  - Lekanesphaera ephippium
  - Lekanesphaera glabella
  - Lekanesphaera hoestlandti
  - Lekanesphaera hookeri
  - Lekanesphaera levii
  - Lekanesphaera marginata
  - Lekanesphaera monodi
  - Lekanesphaera panousei
  - Lekanesphaera rugicauda
  - Lekanesphaera sardoa
  - Lekanesphaera teissieri
  - Lekanesphaera terceirae
  - Lekanesphaera weilli

== Lekanesphaera rugicauda ==
Lekanesphaera rugicauda, also called a "sea slater," is found in estuaries ranging from the Baltic, down to the Netherlands and British Isles, and south to the Bay of Biscay. It is best found in the upper intertidal of brackish waters, such as salt marsh pools, under rocks and wood.
