= Thermosphaeroma cavicauda =

Conservation status
- Critically Endangered (IUCN 2.3)

Scientific classification
- Kingdom: Animalia
- Phylum: Arthropoda
- Clade: Pancrustacea
- Class: Malacostraca
- Order: Isopoda
- Family: Sphaeromatidae
- Genus: Thermosphaeroma
- Species: T. cavicauda

Binomial name
- Thermosphaeroma cavicauda Bowman, 1985

Species of crustacean

Thermosphaeroma cavicauda is a species of isopod in the family Sphaeromatidae. It was endemic to ponds in a ditch fed by a single spring near La Laguna in the Mexican state of Durango. It had a length of 10.2 mm (0.40 in) and was distinguished from the rest of its genus by a notch at the apex of its telson. It was classified as being critically endangered by the IUCN in 1996, but a more recent survey from 2025 has surmised that it has probably gone extinct due to the drying up of the spring it inhabited.

== Taxonomy ==
Thermosphaeroma cavicauda was formally described in 1985 by Thomas Bowman based on a male specimen collected from a spring in the Mexican state of Durango. The specific epithet is derived from the Latin words meaning "hollow-tail", in reference to the unique notch at the apex of its telson.

== Appearance ==
Thermosphaeroma cavicauda grows to a length of 10.2 mm (0.40 in). It can be told apart from all other Thermosphaeroma species by the notch at the apex of its telson.

== Distribution and conservation ==
Thermosphaeroma cavicauda was endemic to ponds in a ditch fed by a single spring near La Laguna in the Mexican state of Durango. At the time of the species' description in 1985, the ditch had a width of 0.3–1 m (1–3 ft) and contained pools of water 5–7 m (20–20 ft) across and 0.3 m (1 ft) deep. The ditch had a bed of fine, easily shaken-up silt, although the water ran clear when undisturbed. The water temperature was 29 °C (84 °F).

A 1996 assessment of the crustacean's conservation status by the IUCN classified it as being critically endangered. A more recent survey of its type locality, visiting it in 2013, found that the spring had gone completely dry. This was likely caused by a combination of erosion due to deforestation, low replenishment of the aquifer due to insufficient rainfall, and poor infrastructure. With the drying up of its only known locality, the species is presumed to have gone extinct.
