= Isocladus =

Isocladus may refer to two different genera:

- Isocladus, a genus of crustaceans in the family Sphaeromatidae
- Isocladus, a synonym for Sphagnum, a genus of plants
