= Thermosphaeroma smithi =

Conservation status
- Critically Endangered (IUCN 2.3)

Scientific classification
- Kingdom: Animalia
- Phylum: Arthropoda
- Clade: Pancrustacea
- Class: Malacostraca
- Order: Isopoda
- Family: Sphaeromatidae
- Genus: Thermosphaeroma
- Species: T. smithi

Binomial name
- Thermosphaeroma smithi Bowman, 1981

Species of crustacean

Thermosphaeroma smithi is a species of isopod in the family Sphaeromatidae. It is endemic to a number of springs and an associated stream in the Balneario San Diego de Alcalá La Laguna in the Mexican state of Chihuahua. It had a length of 11.7 mm (0.46 in). It was classified as being critically endangered by the IUCN in 1996.

== Taxonomy ==
The presence of a novel species of Thermosphaeroma in the Mexican state of Chihuahua was known as far back as 1978. Thermosphaeroma smithi was formally described in 1981 by Thomas Bowman based on a male specimen collected from a spring near Balneario San Diego de Alcalá in Chihuahua. The species is named after Michael L. Smith.

== Appearance ==
Thermosphaeroma smithi grows to a length of 11.7 mm (0.46 in).

== Distribution and conservation ==
Thermosphaeroma smithi is endemic to a number of springs and an associated stream in the Balneario San Diego de Alcalá La Laguna in the Mexican state of Chihuahua. At the time of the species' description in 1981, the spring originated from 15 small fountainheads, which all flowed into a small stream 1 m (3 ft) across and nearly 0.5 m (2 ft) deep. The water temperature was 32.1–43.8 °C (89.8–110.8 °F). The isopods were most common along the silty bed of the stream and its pools. A 2013 survey of the site found that the spring's water was slightly alkaline, with a pH of 8.4.

A 1996 assessment of the crustacean's conservation status by the IUCN classified it as being critically endangered. The hot springs of Balneario San Diego de Alcalá are a site of conservation priority due to the presence of several endemic fish, gastropods, and crustaceans. They were collaboratively managed by the local landowners and the World Wide Fund for Nature, which have successfully conserved these endemics, although the springs have seen a substantial fall in their water levels and resultant habitat degradation.
