= Dynoides castroi =

Scientific classification
- Kingdom: Animalia
- Phylum: Arthropoda
- Class: Malacostraca
- Order: Isopoda
- Family: Sphaeromatidae
- Genus: Dynoides
- Species: D. castroi

Binomial name
- Dynoides castroi Loyola e Silva, 1960

Species of crustacean

Dynoides castroi is a species of isopod in the family Sphaeromatidae.
