= El Carrizo Reservoir =

Reservoir in Tecate Municipality, Baja California, Mexico

Presa El Carrizo Reservoir
- Location within Baja California Location within Mexico
- Location: Baja California, Mexico
- Coordinates: 32.481°N 116.686°W
- Type: reservoir

El Carrizo Reservoir (Spanish: Presa (El) Carrizo) is a reservoir located in Baja California, southwest the city of Tecate. The dam is called El Carrizo, and it supplies 95% of the drinking water for Tijuana and Rosarito Beach. It is managed by CONAGUA.
