= Sphaeroma taborans =

Scientific classification
- Kingdom: Animalia
- Phylum: Arthropoda
- Class: Malacostraca
- Order: Isopoda
- Family: Sphaeromatidae
- Genus: Sphaeroma
- Species: S. taborans

Binomial name
- Sphaeroma taborans Arya, Biju, Benchamin, 2025

Species of crustacean

Sphaeroma taborans is a mangrove-boring isopod, first described by Arya, Biju and Benchamin in 2025.

This specific epithet ‘taborans’ refers to the Mount Tabor Ashram, Zoology Research Centre, St. Stephen's College, Pathanapuram, the Headquarters of the Institution where this research was conducted.

Known only from Munroe Island, Ashtamudi Estuary, Kerala, India.
