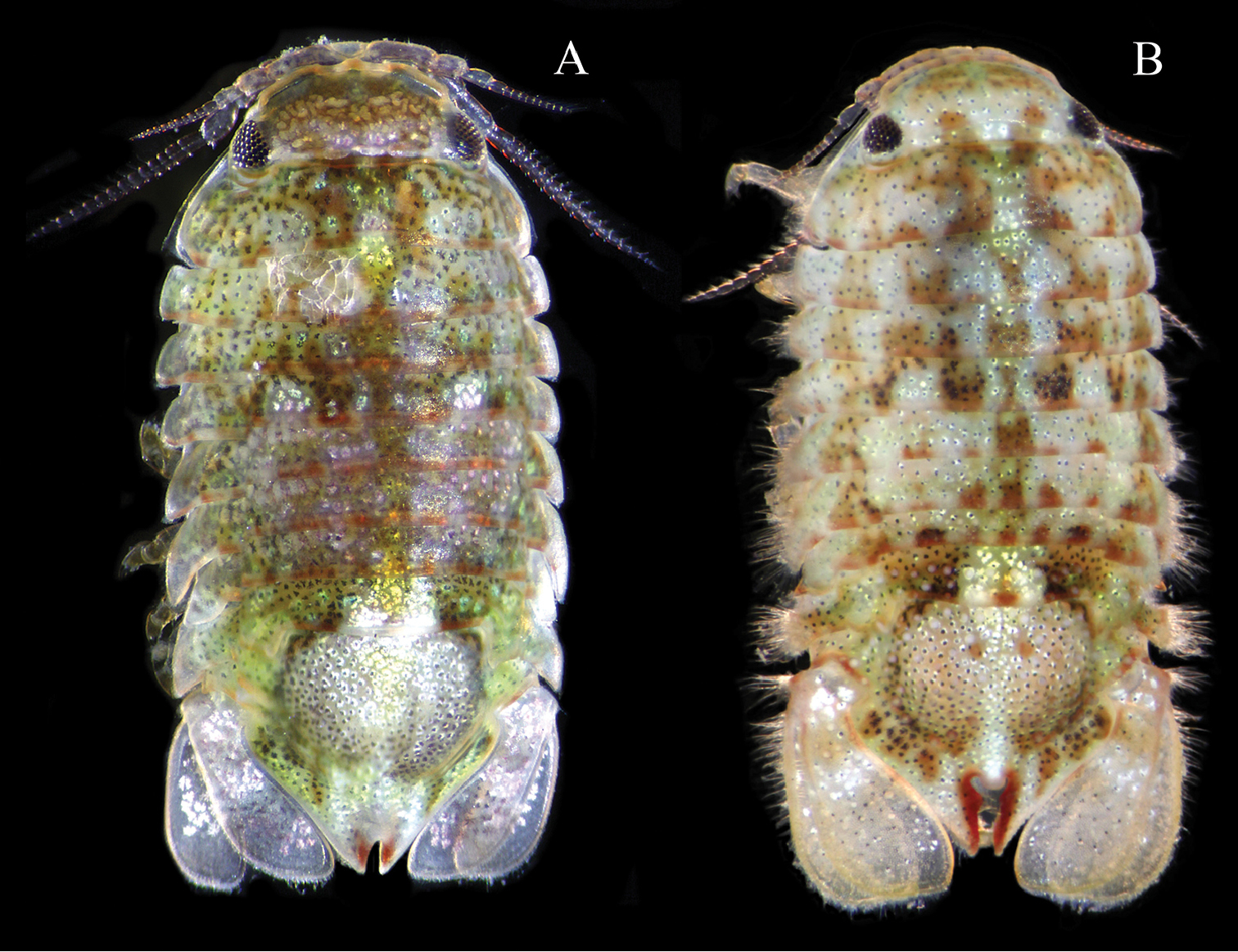

Scientific classification
- Kingdom: Animalia
- Phylum: Arthropoda
- Class: Malacostraca
- Order: Isopoda
- Family: Sphaeromatidae
- Genus: Dynoides
- Species: D. elegans

Binomial name
- Dynoides elegans (Boone, 1923)

Synonyms
- Clianella elegans Boone, 1923

= Dynoides elegans =

Species of crustacean

Dynoides elegans is a species of isopod crustacean in the genus Dynoides. It was originally described in 1923 by Pearl Lee Boone as "Cianella elegans" based on specimens from La Jolla (home of the Scripps Institution of Oceanography) and San Pedro, Los Angeles. It was transferred to the genus Dynoides in 2000, when Boone's genus was sunk into synonymy with Dynoides.
