= Dynoides indicus =

Scientific classification
- Kingdom: Animalia
- Phylum: Arthropoda
- Class: Malacostraca
- Order: Isopoda
- Family: Sphaeromatidae
- Genus: Dynoides
- Species: D. indicus

Binomial name
- Dynoides indicus Müller, 1991

Species of crustacean

Dynoides indicus is a species of isopod in the family Sphaeromatidae. It can be found in the water near Sri Lanka.
