= Thermosphaeroma subequalum =

Conservation status
- Least Concern (IUCN 2.3)

Scientific classification
- Kingdom: Animalia
- Phylum: Arthropoda
- Class: Malacostraca
- Order: Isopoda
- Family: Sphaeromatidae
- Genus: Thermosphaeroma
- Species: T. subequalum

Binomial name
- Thermosphaeroma subequalum Cole & Bane, 1978

Species of crustacean

Thermosphaeroma subequalum is a species of isopod in the family Sphaeromatidae.

The IUCN conservation status of Thermosphaeroma subequalum is "LR/lc", lower risk, least concern. The IUCN status was reviewed in 1996.
