= Dynoides brevicornis =

Scientific classification
- Kingdom: Animalia
- Phylum: Arthropoda
- Class: Malacostraca
- Order: Isopoda
- Family: Sphaeromatidae
- Genus: Dynoides
- Species: D. brevicornis

Binomial name
- Dynoides brevicornis Kussakin & Malyutina, 1987

Species of crustacean

Dynoides brevicornis is a species of isopod in the family Sphaeromatidae.
