= Thermosphaeroma dugesi =

Conservation status
- Critically Endangered (IUCN 2.3)

Scientific classification
- Kingdom: Animalia
- Phylum: Arthropoda
- Class: Malacostraca
- Order: Isopoda
- Family: Sphaeromatidae
- Genus: Thermosphaeroma
- Species: T. dugesi

Binomial name
- Thermosphaeroma dugesi (Dollfus, 1893)

Species of crustacean

Thermosphaeroma dugesi is a species of isopod in the family Sphaeromatidae. It is found in Mexico.

The IUCN conservation status of Thermosphaeroma dugesi is "CR", critically endangered. The species faces an extremely high risk of extinction in the immediate future. The IUCN status was reviewed in 1996.
