= Dynoides barnardii =

Scientific classification
- Kingdom: Animalia
- Phylum: Arthropoda
- Class: Malacostraca
- Order: Isopoda
- Family: Sphaeromatidae
- Genus: Dynoides
- Species: D. barnardii

Binomial name
- Dynoides barnardii Baker, 1928

Species of crustacean

Dynoides barnardii is a species of isopod in the family Sphaeromatidae.
