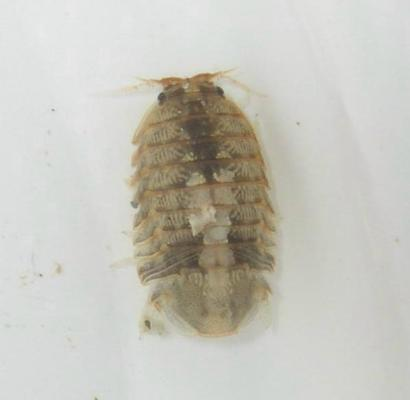

Scientific classification
- Kingdom: Animalia
- Phylum: Arthropoda
- Class: Malacostraca
- Order: Isopoda
- Family: Sphaeromatidae
- Genus: Gnorimosphaeroma
- Species: G. oregonense

Binomial name
- Gnorimosphaeroma oregonense (Dana, 1853)

Synonyms
- Sphaeroma oregonensis Dana, 1853 Gnorimosphaeroma oregonensis (Dana, 1853)

= Gnorimosphaeroma oregonense =

Species of crustacean

Gnorimosphaeroma oregonense, the Oregon pill bug, is a small intertidal isopod crustacean. It is an oval-shaped organism roughly 6 mm in length, and about twice as long as it is wide. The primary habitat of G. oregonense is the mid-Californian to Alaskan coast, where it inhabits tidal pools and the intertidal region up to depths of 24 metres (79 ft).
