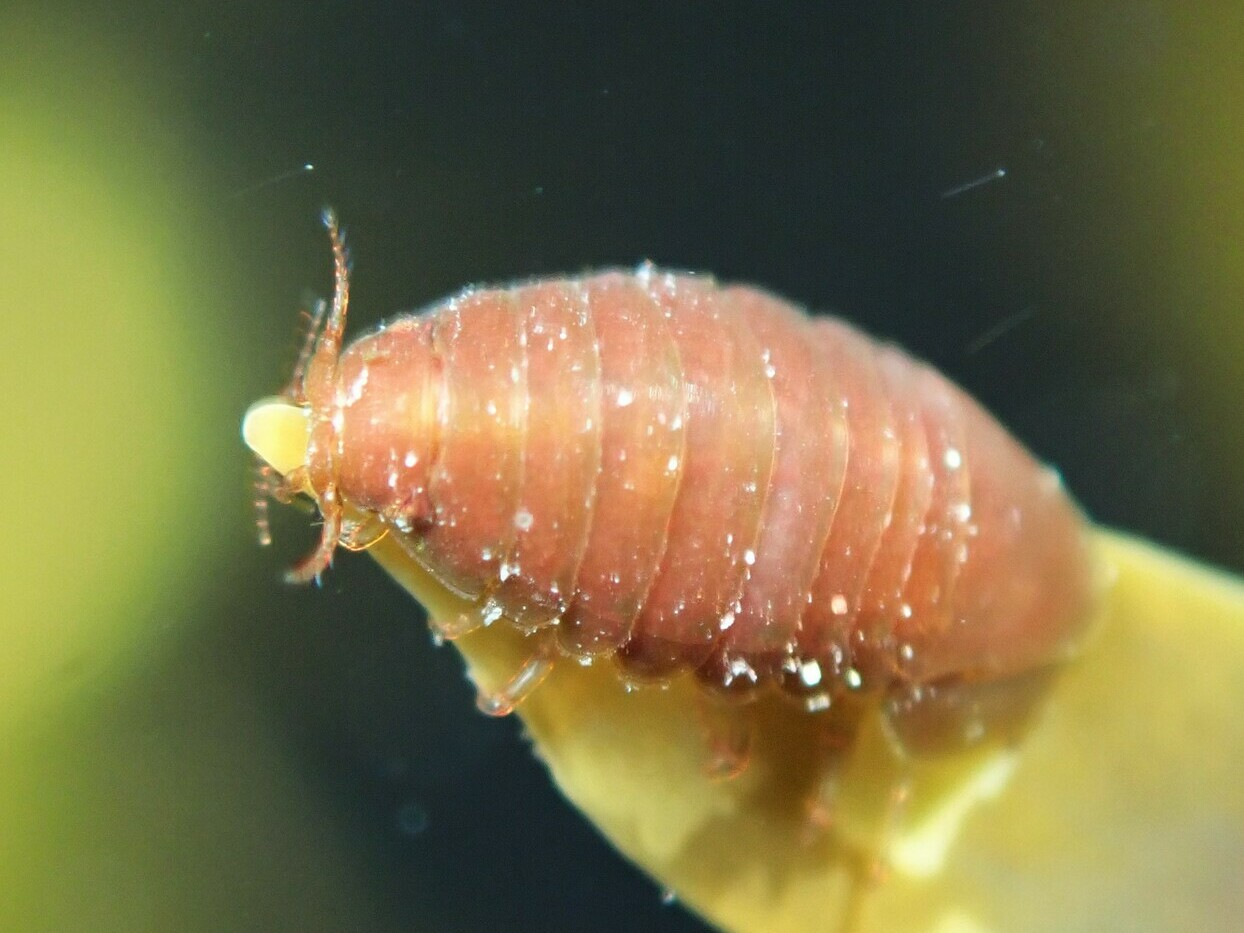
- At Island Bay, Wellington, NZ

Scientific classification
- Kingdom: Animalia
- Phylum: Arthropoda
- Class: Malacostraca
- Order: Isopoda
- Family: Sphaeromatidae
- Genus: Scutuloidea
- Species: S. maculata

Binomial name
- Scutuloidea maculata Chilton, 1883

= Scutuloidea maculata =

Species of isopod

Scutuloidea maculata is a species of marine isopod in the family Sphaeromatidae, first described by Charles Chilton in 1883. No subspecies are listed in the Catalogue of Life.

== Description and ecology ==
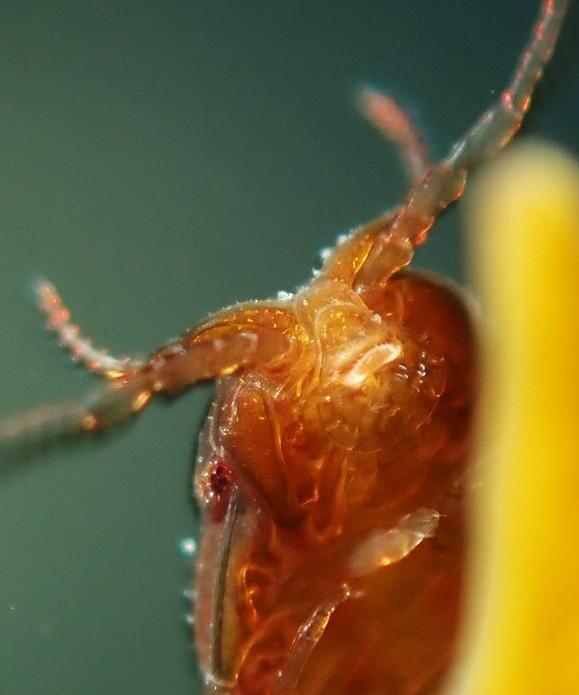
A close-up of facial features of Scutuloidea maculata

This species is recognised by having a single large plate as a uropod. Females are often carried on the backs of the males of the species. Scutuloidea maculata can be visually distinguished from Scutuloidea kutu, a similar species in appearance which is also found in New Zealand waters, by its chestnut brown colour, having a rounder body and eyes, as well as an apical notch on their pleotelsons.

== Distribution and habitat ==
Scutuloidea maculata is found in the northern waters of New Zealand, where it lives in seaweeds, algae, sponges, bryozoa, hydroids in exposed reef formations, especially around red seaweeds such as Plocamium costatum and Osmundaria colensoi. The species is much more commonly found than Scutuloidea kutu, especially in the first two metres of the subtidal zone, seemingly preferring more exposed environments.
