= Amphoroidea falcifer =

Scientific classification
- Kingdom: Animalia
- Phylum: Arthropoda
- Clade: Pancrustacea
- Class: Malacostraca
- Order: Isopoda
- Family: Sphaeromatidae
- Genus: Amphoroidea
- Species: A. falcifer

Binomial name
- Amphoroidea falcifer G. M. Thomson, 1879

Species of crustacean

Amphoroidea falcifer is an isopod of the family Sphaeromatidae, endemic to New Zealand. It grows up to 14 millimetres (0.55 in), and is found on algae such as Durvillea.
