= Dynoides viridis =

Scientific classification
- Kingdom: Animalia
- Phylum: Arthropoda
- Clade: Pancrustacea
- Class: Malacostraca
- Order: Isopoda
- Family: Sphaeromatidae
- Genus: Dynoides
- Species: D. viridis

Binomial name
- Dynoides viridis Bruce, 1982

Species of crustacean

Dynoides viridis is a species of isopod in the family Sphaeromatidae. It was first found on Heron Island, Great Barrier Reef.
