= Dynoides brevispina =

Scientific classification
- Kingdom: Animalia
- Phylum: Arthropoda
- Class: Malacostraca
- Order: Isopoda
- Family: Sphaeromatidae
- Genus: Dynoides
- Species: D. brevispina

Binomial name
- Dynoides brevispina Bruce, 1980

Species of crustacean

Dynoides brevispina is a species of isopod in the family Sphaeromatidae.
