= Dynoides artocanalis =

Scientific classification
- Kingdom: Animalia
- Phylum: Arthropoda
- Class: Malacostraca
- Order: Isopoda
- Family: Sphaeromatidae
- Genus: Dynoides
- Species: D. artocanalis

Binomial name
- Dynoides artocanalis Nunomura, 1997

Species of crustacean

Dynoides artocanalis is a species of isopod in the family Sphaeromatidae.
