= Thermosphaeroma mendozai =

Scientific classification
- Kingdom: Animalia
- Phylum: Arthropoda
- Class: Malacostraca
- Order: Isopoda
- Family: Sphaeromatidae
- Genus: Thermosphaeroma
- Species: T. mendozai

Binomial name
- Thermosphaeroma mendozai Schotte, 2000

Species of crustacean

Thermosphaeroma mendozai is a species of isopod in the family Sphaeromatidae. It is found in Mexico.
