= Thermosphaeroma milleri =

Conservation status
- Endangered (IUCN 2.3)

Scientific classification
- Kingdom: Animalia
- Phylum: Arthropoda
- Clade: Pancrustacea
- Class: Malacostraca
- Order: Isopoda
- Family: Sphaeromatidae
- Genus: Thermosphaeroma
- Species: T. milleri

Binomial name
- Thermosphaeroma milleri Bowman, 1981

Species of crustacean

Thermosphaeroma milleri is a species of isopod in the family Sphaeromatidae. It was endemic to a complex of three springs in the Bolsón de los Muertes basin of northwest Chihuahua. It had a length of 11.5 mm (0.45 in). It was classified as being endangered by the IUCN in 1996, but a more recent survey from 2025 has surmised that it has probably gone extinct due to the drying up of the springs it inhabited.

== Taxonomy ==
Thermosphaeroma milleri was formally described in 1981 by Thomas Bowman based on a male specimen collected from a spring in the Mexican state of Chihuahua. The species is named after Robert R. Miller.

== Appearance ==
Thermosphaeroma milleri grows to a length of 11.5 mm (0.45 in).

== Distribution and conservation ==
At the time of its description in 1981, Thermosphaeroma milleri was endemic to three springs near each other in the Bolsón de los Muertes basin of northwest Chihuahua. All three springs were near Ejido Rancho Nuevo, with two of them having been completely altered to make ponds for agricultural purposes. Ojo El Medio and Ojo de las Varas are springs arising through quicksand that have been converted into ponds around 0.5 m (2 ft) deep. They have beds of sand and mud, on which grows some scant algae and submerged grass. Ojo de Carbonerois is somewhat less altered than the other two springs, being allowed to flow as a creek for nearly 100 m (300 ft) before being fed into agricultural irrigation. This cluster of springs was around 1 m (3 ft) deep with a bed of mud, rocks, and silt. It has some scant flora consisting of algae, grass, and watercress. All three springs had water temperatures around 27–28 °C (81–82 °F).

The species shows precopulatory mate-guarding.

A 1996 assessment of the crustacean's conservation status by the IUCN classified it as being endangered. A more recent survey of its type locality, visiting it in 2013, found that the spring had gone completely dry, with nearby residents confirming this had occurred during the 1990s. This was likely caused by excessive groundwater extraction from the aquifer feeding the springs. With the drying up of its only known locality and searches of nearby springs finding no new populations, the species is presumed to have gone extinct.
