= Dynoides crenulatus =

Scientific classification
- Kingdom: Animalia
- Phylum: Arthropoda
- Class: Malacostraca
- Order: Isopoda
- Family: Sphaeromatidae
- Genus: Dynoides
- Species: D. crenulatus

Binomial name
- Dynoides crenulatus Carvacho & Hassmann, 1984

Species of crustacean

Dynoides crenulatus is a species of isopod in the family Sphaeromatidae.
