= Dynoides spinipodus =

Scientific classification
- Kingdom: Animalia
- Phylum: Arthropoda
- Class: Malacostraca
- Order: Isopoda
- Family: Sphaeromatidae
- Genus: Dynoides
- Species: D. spinipodus

Binomial name
- Dynoides spinipodus Kwon & Kim, 1986

Species of crustacean

Dynoides spinipodus is a species of isopod in the family Sphaeromatidae.
