= Lekanesphaera hookeri =

Scientific classification
- Kingdom: Animalia
- Phylum: Arthropoda
- Clade: Pancrustacea
- Class: Malacostraca
- Order: Isopoda
- Family: Sphaeromatidae
- Genus: Lekanesphaera
- Species: L. hookeri

Binomial name
- Lekanesphaera hookeri (Leach, 1814)

Synonyms
- Exosphaeroma pulchellum Colosi, 1921; Oniscus conglobator Pallas, 1766; Oniscus globator Pallas, 1772; Sphaeroma hookeri Leach, 1814

Species of isopod

Lekanesphaera hookeri is a species of isopod in the family Sphaeromatidae. It can be found in the Black Sea where it curls into small spheres on the sandy benthos.
