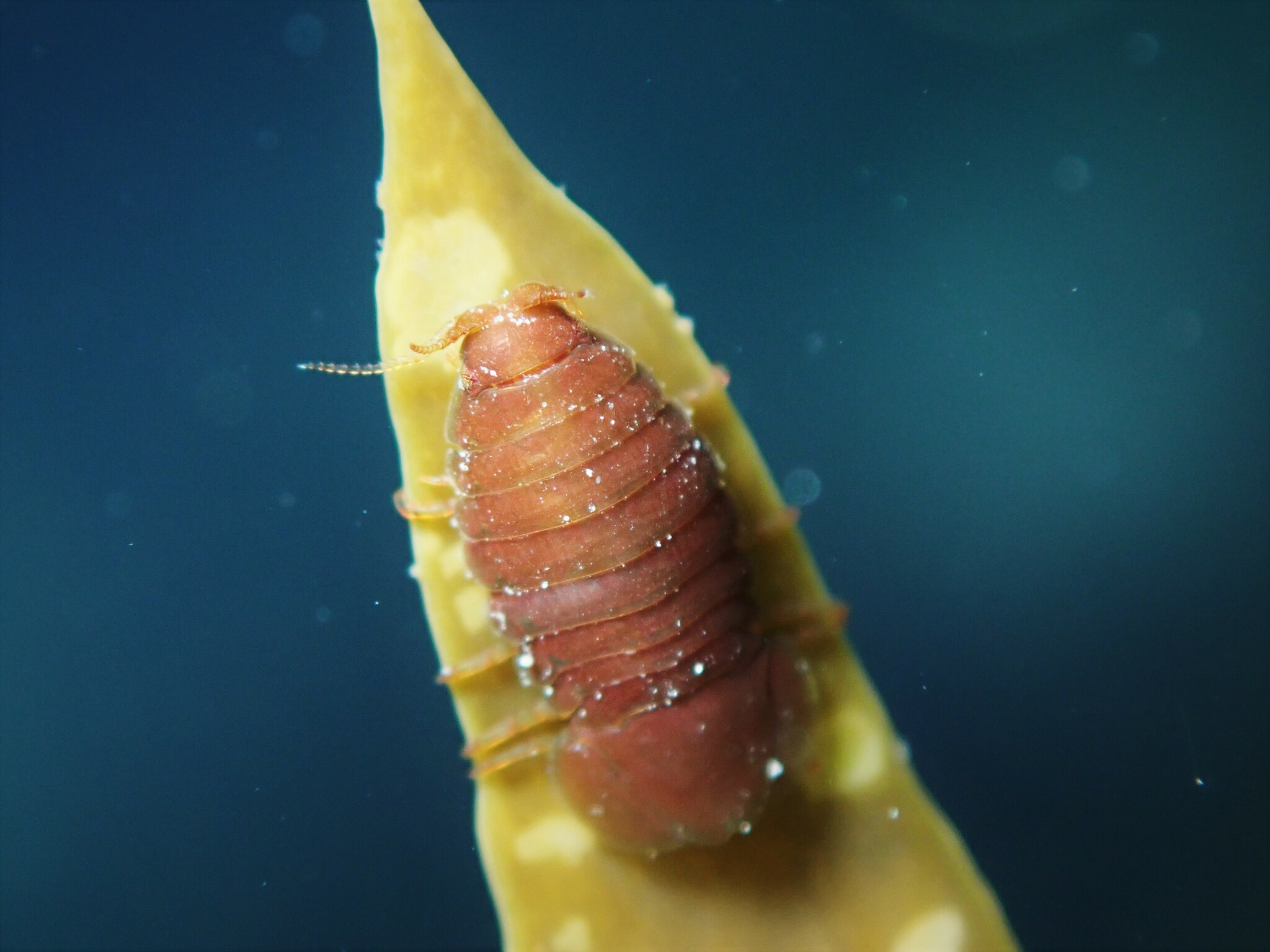
- Scutuloidea maculata

Scientific classification
- Kingdom: Animalia
- Phylum: Arthropoda
- Class: Malacostraca
- Order: Isopoda
- Family: Sphaeromatidae
- Genus: Scutuloidea; Chilton, 1883

= Scutuloidea =

Genus of crustaceans

Scutuloidea is a genus of isopods. All species in this genus are endemic to New Zealand.

== Species ==
- Scutuloidea kutu
- Scutuloidea maculata
