= Thermosphaeroma macrura =

Conservation status
- Critically Endangered (IUCN 2.3)

Scientific classification
- Kingdom: Animalia
- Phylum: Arthropoda
- Clade: Pancrustacea
- Class: Malacostraca
- Order: Isopoda
- Family: Sphaeromatidae
- Genus: Thermosphaeroma
- Species: T. macrura

Binomial name
- Thermosphaeroma macrura Bowman, 1985

Species of crustacean

Thermosphaeroma macrura is a species of isopod in the family Sphaeromatidae. It is endemic to hot springs and streams near the town of Julimes in the Mexican state of Chihuahua. It has a length of 7–10.8 mm (0.28–0.43 in) and is distinguished from the rest of its genus by its very long pleotelson. It was classified as being critically endangered by the IUCN in 1996.

== Taxonomy ==
Thermosphaeroma macrura was formally described in 1985 by Thomas Bowman based on a male specimen collected from a tributary of the Conchos River in the Mexican state of Chihuahua. The specific epithet is derived from the Greek words meaning "long-tail", in reference to its very long pleotelson.

== Appearance ==
Thermosphaeroma macrura grows to a length of 7–10.8 mm (0.28–0.43 in). It has a much longer pleotelson than other Thermosphaeroma species.

== Distribution and conservation ==
Thermosphaeroma macrura is endemic to hot springs and streams near the town of Julimes in Chihuahua. It was described from a highly polluted spring-fed stream with a width of 5–10 m (20–30 ft) and around 1 m (3 ft) deep. The ditch had a bed of easily shaken-up silt and rocks, but the water ran clear, although murky, when undisturbed. The water temperature was 32 °C (90 °F). It is also known from springs and thermal baths around this locality. The water at these sites is slightly alkaline, with a pH of 9.4.

A 1996 assessment of the crustacean's conservation status by the IUCN classified it as being critically endangered. The hot springs of Julimes, including the El Pandeño spring where this species occurs, are protected as part of the Geothermal Springs of Julimes Ramsar site due to the presence of several endemic fish, gastropods, and crustaceans. They are managed by the Mexican governments and the NGO Amigos del Pandeño, which have successfully conserved these endemics, although the springs have seen a substantial fall in their water levels.
