= Abraham Lincoln National Heritage Area =

United States National Heritage Area in Illinois

- Location within Illinois Location within the United States
- Location: Central Illinois
- Coordinates: 39°48′0″N 89°38′52″W
- Established: May 8, 2008
- Governing body: Looking for Lincoln Heritage Coalition

The Abraham Lincoln National Heritage Area is a National Heritage Area in central Illinois telling the story of Abraham Lincoln. Spanning 43 counties, it is a federally-designated area intended to encourage historic preservation and an appreciation of the history and heritage of the site, with assistance from the National Park Service.

The Abraham Lincoln National Heritage Area was created as part of the Consolidated Natural Resources Act of 2008 (S. 2739), an omnibus bill. It was originally introduced in the Senate by Dick Durbin and in the House of Representatives by Ray LaHood, both from Illinois. The legislation also provided $10 million over 10 years, with no more than $1 million awarded in any single year, to make federal grants available for preservation, education and economic development. Grants awarded for Lincoln National Heritage Area activities must be matched dollar-for-dollar in state, local or private funds.

The management authority for the Abraham Lincoln National Heritage Area is the Looking for Lincoln Heritage Coalition and follows Lincoln's life from his birth and childhood, to his early life and career, to the Lincoln–Douglas debates of 1858.

In 2019, the United States Senate passed a bill expanding the Abraham National Heritage Area to include locations in Jonesboro and Freeport, Illinois, which were among the seven stops during the Lincoln–Douglas debates.

== Heritage sites ==
The Heritage Area includes the following sites:

- Lincoln Home National Historic Site
- Lincoln Tomb State Historic Site
- Lincoln's New Salem State Historic Site at New Salem, Menard County, Illinois
- Abraham Lincoln Presidential Library and Museum
- Lincoln Log Cabin State Historic Site
- Mount Pulaski Courthouse State Historic Site, Postville Courthouse State Historic Site and Metamora Courthouse State Historic Site
- Lincoln-Herndon Law Offices State Historic Site
- David Davis Mansion State Historic Site
- Vandalia State House State Historic Site
- Lincoln Douglas Debate Museum
- Macon County Log Court House
- Richard James Oglesby Mansion
- Lincoln Trail Homestead State Memorial
- John Wood Mansion
- Beardstown Courthouse
- Old Main at Knox College
- Carl Sandburg State Historic Site
- Bryant Cottage State Historic Site
- Dr. William Fithian Home
- Vermilion County Museum
