= Amphoroidea =

Scientific classification
- Kingdom: Animalia
- Phylum: Arthropoda
- Clade: Pancrustacea
- Class: Malacostraca
- Order: Isopoda
- Family: Sphaeromatidae
- Genus: Amphoroidea; H. Milne-Edwards, 1840

Species
- See text.

Genus of crustaceans

Amphoroidea is a genus of isopod of the family Sphaeromatidae, containing the following species:

- Amphoroidea angustata Baker, 1908
- Amphoroidea australiensis Dana, 1853
- Amphoroidea elegans Baker, 1911
- Amphoroidea falcifer G. Thomson, 1879
- Amphoroidea longipes Hurley & Jansen, 1977
- Amphoroidea media Hurley & Jansen, 1971
- Amphoroidea typa H. Milne-Edwards, 1840
