= 2008 in the environment =

This is a list of notable events relating to the environment in 2008. They relate to environmental law, conservation, environmentalism and environmental issues.

== Events ==
- International Year of the Dolphin (Continuing 2007–2008)
- International Polar Year (Continuing 2007–2009)
- International Year of Planet Earth
- International Year of Sanitation
- Massachusetts enacts the first Natural resource protection zoning regulations.
- Amigos del Pandeño, an environmental organization in Chihuahua, Mexico, was established

=== February ===
- The Sarawak Corridor of Renewable Energy is launched.

=== March ===
- The Ecology Summit was held on Necker Island.

=== May ===
- The Food, Conservation, and Energy Act is passed in the United States. It has provisions for conservation and energy efficiency in United States energy law.
- The Consolidated Natural Resources Act of 2008 is enacted on May 8, 2008.

=== June ===
- The 60th International Whaling Commission meeting was held in Santiago, Chile.

=== July ===
- The Agreement on the Conservation of Gorillas and Their Habitats came into effect.

=== August ===
- Concerns were raised about air pollution at the 2008 Summer Olympics held in Beijing, China.

=== September ===
- The Waste Minimisation Act 2008 passed into law in New Zealand.

=== November ===
- The Climate Change Act 2008 passed into law in the United Kingdom.

=== December ===
- The 2008 United Nations Climate Change Conference took place in Poznań, Poland, between December 1 and December 12, 2008.
- The Kingston Fossil Plant coal fly ash slurry spill occurred when an ash dike ruptured at an 84-acre (0.34 km^{2}) solid waste containment area at the Tennessee Valley Authority's Kingston Fossil Plant in Roane County, Tennessee in the United States. An estimated 1.1 billion US gallons (4,200,000 m^{3}) of coal fly ash slurry was released.

== See also ==
- Human impact on the environment
- List of environmental issues
- List of years in the environment
