= Consolidated Natural Resources Act of 2008 =

- Long title: A bill to authorize certain programs and activities in the Department of the Interior, the Forest Service, and the Department of Energy, to implement further the Act approving the Covenant to Establish a Commonwealth of the Northern Mariana Islands in Political Union with the United States of America, to amend the Compact of Free Association Amendments Act of 2003, and for other purposes.
- Acronyms (colloquial): CNRA
- Enacted by: the 110th United States Congress
- Effective: May 8, 2008

Citations
- Public law: 110-229
- Statutes at Large: 122 Stat. 754-876

Legislative history
- Introduced in the House of Representatives as S. 2739 by Jeff Bingaman (D-NM) on March 10, 2008; Committee consideration by Energy and Natural Resources; Passed the Senate on April 10, 2008 (91-4); Passed the House on April 29, 2008 (291-117); Signed into law by President George W. Bush on May 8, 2008

The Consolidated Natural Resources Act of 2008 (Pub. L. 110–229 (text) (PDF), S. 2739, 122 Stat. 754-876, enacted May 8, 2008; CNRA) was an act passed in the 110th United States Congress and enacted on May 8, 2008.

== Legislative history ==
The bill was introduced by Senator Jeff Bingaman of New Mexico, a Democrat and the chairman of the Senate Committee on Energy and Natural Resources, on March 10, 2008, as S. 2739. It was a "bicameral and bipartisan" package of land and water federal lands bills considered as an omnibus bill.

The bill was reported by the Energy and Natural Resources Committee on March 11. It passed the full Senate on April 10 on a 91-4 vote, with five Senators not voting. It passed the United States House of Representatives on April 29 on a 291-117 vote, with 23 Representatives not voting. The bill passed the House under a motion to suspend the rules and pass (usually used for non-controversial legislation and requiring a two-thirds majority to pass). It was signed into law by President George W. Bush on May 8, 2008.

The long title of the act is A bill to authorize certain programs and activities in the Department of the Interior, the Forest Service, and the Department of Energy, to implement further the Act approving the Covenant to Establish a Commonwealth of the Northern Mariana Islands in Political Union with the United States of America, to amend the Compact of Free Association Amendments Act of 2003, and for other purposes.

== Provisions ==
Title I is entitled "Forest Service Authorizations":

- Sec. 101 creates the Wild Sky Wilderness in Washington, designating 106,577 acres (431.30 km^{2}) of national forest in the Mount Baker-Snoqualmie National Forest as wilderness area, the most-protected class of federal lands. The Senate has passed the legislation for the Wild Sky Wilderness three previous Congresses, but because legislation had previously failed to pass the House, it was not until the enactment of the Consolidated Natural Resources Act that the wilderness area was designated (S. 520 and H.R. 886).
- Sec. 102 designates a 19.6 miles (31.5 km) trail around Waldo Lake in Oregon's Willamette National Forest in Oregon as the "Jim Weaver Loop Trail." Jim Weaver was the U.S. representative of Oregon's 4th congressional district from 1975 to 1987 (H.R. 247).

Title II is entitled "Bureau of Land Management Authorizations":

- Sec. 201 authorizes the Bureau of Land Management (BLM), part of the United States Department of the Interior, to designate the Piedras Blancas Light Station in California (H.R. 276) an Outstanding Natural Areas within the BLM's National Landscape Conservation System
- Sec. 202 authorizes the BLM to designate the Jupiter Inlet Lighthouse and surrounding federal lands in Florida as an Outstanding Natural Area within the National Landscape Conservation System (S. 1143 and H.R. 1922)
- Sec. 203 permit the conveyance without consideration of approximately 51 acres (210,000 m^{2}) of BLM land by Clark County, Nevada to the Nevada Division of State Lands for use by the Nevada National Guard (S. 1608 and H.R. 815).

Title III is entitled "National Park Service Authorizations":

Subtitle A—Cooperative Agreements has only one section, Sec. 301, which authorizes the Secretary of the Interior to "enter into cooperative agreements with State, local, or tribal governments, other Federal agencies, other public entities, educational institutions, private nonprofit organizations, or participating private landowners for the purpose of protecting natural resources of units of the National Park System through collaborative efforts on land inside and outside of National Park System units," and sets terms and conditions, limitations, and authorizes appropriations for such cooperative agreements. One of the terms is that cooperative agreements must provide clear and direct benefits to natural resources in units of the NPS such as the preservation of riparian systems, eradication of invasive exotic species, and restoration of native wildlife habitat" (S. 241 and H.R. 658)

Subtitle B—Boundary Adjustments and Authorizations includes three sections:

- Sec. 311 authorizes the Secretary of the Interior to acquire no more than 110 acres (0.45 km^{2}) of land to be added to the Carl Sandburg Home National Historic Site via willing sellers or donation (S. 488 and H.R. 1100)
- Sec. 312 adjusts the boundary of the Lowell National Historical Park in order to include five parcels of land within the city of Lowell, Massachusetts (S. 867 and H.R. 299)
- Sec. 313 adjust the boundary of the Minidoka Internment National Monument to include the Bainbridge Island Japanese American Exclusion Memorial in Bainbridge Island, Washington (S. 916 and H.R. 161)
- Sec. 314 appropriates an additional $10 million for land acquisition at Acadia National Park and authorizes the Secretary of the Interior to participate in an Intermodal Transportation Center located outside of the park boundary in Trenton, Maine (S. 1329 and H.R. 2251)

Subtitle C—Studies includes seven sections:

- Sec. 321 directs the Secretary of the Interior to conduct a special resource study to determine whether the American Civil War battlefield site of the First Battle of Newtonia and Second Battle of Newtonia should be added to the Wilson's Creek National Battlefield (H.R. 376)
- Sec. 322 directs the Secretary to conduct a study to determine the suitability and feasibility of designating the Soldiers Memorial Military Museum in St. Louis, Missouri, as a unit of the National Park System (H.R. 1047)
- Sec. 323 directs the Secretary to conduct a study to determine the suitability and feasibility of designating the Wolf House on Highway 5 in Norfork, Arkansas, as a unit of the National Park System (S. 1941)
- Sec. 324 directs the Secretary to conduct a study to determine the suitability and feasibility of establishing a memorial in Texas on one of the sites where large debris from the Space Shuttle Columbia was recovered following the Columbia disaster (H.R. 807)
- Sec. 325 directs the Secretary to conduct a study to determine whether sites important to the life of Cesar Chavez and the farm labor movement meet the criteria for listing on the National Register of Historic Places or designation as National Historic Landmarks (S. 327 and H.R. 359)
- Sec. 326 directs the Secretary to conduct a study to determine the suitability and feasibility of designating certain historic buildings and areas in Taunton, Massachusetts, as a unit of the National Park Service (S. 1184 and H.R. 1021)
- Sec. 327 directs the Secretary to conduct a study of the Rim of the Valley Corridor area in Southern California ("generally including the mountains encircling the San Fernando, La Crescenta, Santa Clarita, Simi, and Conejo Valleys") to determine whether any part of the area should be added to the Santa Monica Mountains National Recreation Area (H.R. 1835; S. 2739)

Subtitle D—Memorials, Commissions, and Museums includes the following sections:

- Sec. 331 directs the establishment of a commemorative work on federal land in the District of Columbia without using federal funds to honor the service of American Revolutionary War Brigadier General Francis Marion (S. 312 and H.R. 497)
- Sec. 332 gives the Dwight D. Eisenhower Memorial Commission greater administrative powers, "including the ability to enter into contracts for specialized or professional services, appoint an architect, and enter into cooperative agreements with federal agencies, state, local, tribal, and international governments, and private organizations" (S. 890 and H.R. 2094)
- Sec. 333 establishes a commission to study the creation of a National Museum of the American Latino in Washington, D.C. (S. 500 and H.R. 512)
- Sec. 334 establishes two commissions to commemorate the 400th anniversary of the voyage of Samuel de Champlain, the 400th anniversary of the voyage of Henry Hudson, and the 200th anniversary of the voyage of Robert Fulton (S. 1148 and H.R. 1520)
- Sec. 335 expresses the sense of Congress that the Museum of the American Quilter's Society in Paducah, Kentucky, should be designated as the "National Quilt Museum of the United States." (H. Con. Res. 29)
- Sec. 336 expresses the sense of Congress that the National Museum of Wildlife Art in Jackson, Wyoming, should be designated as the "National Museum of Wildlife Art of the United States" (S. Con. Res. 6 and H. Con. Res. 116)
- Sec. 337 redesignates the Ellis Island Library as the "Bob Hope Memorial Library" (H.R. 759)
  - Amends the National Trails System Act to create the Star-Spangled Banner National Historic Trail, commemorating the Chesapeake Campaign of the War of 1812 (S. 797 and H.R. 1388)
  - Convey a visitor center and adjacent land associated with the Lewis and Clark National Historic Trail to the non-profit Missouri River Basin Lewis and Clark Interpretive Trail and Visitor Center Foundation, a not-for-profit organization, with the requirement that the Foundation manage the site in accordance with National Park Service standards (S. 471 and H.R. 761)
  - Conduct a study to determine the suitability and feasibility of extending the Lewis and Clark National Historic Trail to include sites in the Eastern United States associated with the preparation and return phases of the Lewis and Clark Expedition (S. 1991 and H.R. 3616).
  - Designate specified segments of the Eightmile River in Connecticut as components of the National Wild and Scenic Rivers System (S. 553 and H.R. 986)
  - Exchange of interests in land within Denali National Park in Alaska with the Alaska Railroad, to allow the Railroad to complete a turnaround "to better serve train visitors visiting the park" (S. 1808)
  - Increase appropriations for the National Underground Network as authorized by National Underground Railroad Network to Freedom Act of 1998 (S. 1709 and H.R. 1239)
  - Authorize the Secretary of the Interior, subject to an appropriation, to pay subcontractors of Pacific General, Inc. for work performed at Grand Canyon National Park between fiscal year 2002 and 2003 under a construction contract for which they have not been paid (H.R. 1191)
- Title IV
  - Establish several new National Heritage Areas and modify several existing heritage areas, including:
    - Establish the Journey Through Hallowed Ground National Heritage Area (S. 289 and H.R. 1483)
    - Establish the Niagara Falls National Heritage Area (S. 800 and H.R. 1483)
    - Establish the Abraham Lincoln National Heritage Area in Illinois (S. 955 and H.R. 1483)
    - Make several technical corrections to existing National Heritage Area Authorities, and increase the authorization of appropriation levels for several existing heritage areas (S. 817 and H.R. 1483)
    - Extend the authorization until 2011 for the Coastal Heritage Trail (S. 1039 and H.R. 1815)
    - Study the feasibility of designating the coastal areas of Clatsop County, Oregon, and Pacific County, Washington and local historical areas along the Columbia River as the Columbia-Pacific National Heritage Area (S. 257 and H.R. 407)
- Title V
  - Authorizes the United States Geological Survey and the Bureau of Reclamation to perform a comprehensive study of water resources in the State of Alaska and identify critical needs (S. 200 and H.R. 1114)
  - Authorizes the Redwood Valley County Water District in California to enter into additional non-federal obligations in order to finance the procurement of dedicated water rights (S. 1112 and H.R. 235)
  - Transfer ownership of the American River Pump Station Project located at Auburn, California, to the Placer County Water Agency (H.R. 482)
  - Authorizes the Bureau of Reclamation to conduct a feasibility study, include an environmental evaluation and a cost allocation, on raising the height of the Arthur V. Watkins Dam to allow for additional water storage supply (S. 512 and H.R. 839);
  - Authorizes the United States Geological Survey and Bureau of Reclamation to provide the State of New Mexico technical assistance and grants to conduct comprehensive water resources mapping in New Mexico and develop statewide digital orthophotography mapping (S. 255)
  - Convey certain buildings and lands of the Bureau of Reclamation Yakima Project in Washington to the Yakima-Tieton Irrigation District (S. 235)
  - Add Juab County, Utah to the Bonneville Unit of the Central Utah Project so that funds may be provided to study systems for groundwater recharge, management, and the conjunctive use of surface water resources with groundwater resources (S. 1110)
  - Allow any owner of land within the A & B Irrigation District in Idaho to repay, at a time of their choosing, the construction costs of District project facilities (S. 220 and H.R. 467).
  - Amend the Oregon Resource Conservation Act of 1996 to extend the authorization of the Deschutes River Conservancy Program; authorize federal participation in rehabilitating Wallowa Dam; authorize a water resource study in the Little Butte/Bear Creek basin; amend a contract of the North Unit Irrigation District to facilitate a water conservation project (S. 263, S. 264, S. 265, S. 266 and H.R. 495)
  - Study the feasibility of implementing a water supply and conservation project in the Republican River Basin between Harlan County Lake in Nebraska and Milford Lake in Kansas to improve water management efficiency (H.R. 1025)
  - Amend the Reclamation Wastewater and Groundwater Study and Facilities Act to authorize the Bureau of Reclamation to assist in providing recycled water to the Eastern Municipal Water District in California (H.R. 30) and to the Palo Alto and Mountain View, Pittsburg, Delta Diablo, Antioch, North Coast County, South County Santa Clara Valley, and San Jose Water Districts (S. 1475 and H.R. 1526)
  - Allocate security-related costs incurred post-September 11 attacks to Reclamation water and power users (S. 1258 and H.R. 1662).
  - "Study the obstacles to reducing the quantity of water produced during oil, natural gas, coal-bed methane exploration and evaluate the extent possible that water can be used for irrigation or other purposes without adversely affecting water quality, public health, or the environment" (S. 1116 and H.R. 902)
  - Authorize federal participation in the Platte River Endangered Species Recovery Implementation Program Cooperative Agreement, and the modification of Pathfinder Dam and Reservoir (S. 752 and H.R. 1462)
  - Study the feasibility of alternatives to augment the water supplies of the Central Oklahoma Master Conservatory District and the cities it serves (S. 175 and H.R. 1337)
- Title VI
  - Amends the Energy Policy Act of 2005 to award grants for advanced energy technology transfer centers (H.R. 85).
  - Reauthorize the Steel and Aluminum Energy Conservation and Technology Competitiveness Act to Fiscal Year 2012 and emphasize the research and development of technologies that reduce greenhouse gas emissions (H.R. 1126).
- Title VII
  - Extend United States immigration law as defined by the Immigration and Nationality Act of 1965 to the Commonwealth of the Northern Mariana Islands (CNMI) subject to a transition period through December 31, 2017 (S. 1634 and H.R. 3079).
  - Granted CNMI a non-voting Delegate in the U.S. House of Representatives and established the process for electing the Delegate.
- Title VIII
  - Amend the Compact of Free Association Amendments Act of 2003 in order to improve legal services, infrastructure, and education services for the associated states of Micronesia, the Republic of the Marshall Islands, and the Republic of Palau.

== Other ==
The National Parks Conservation Association and League of Conservation Voters supported the bill.

== See also ==
- 2008 in the environment
