= El Pandeño =

Thermal springs

Julimes Springs in Chihuahua, Mexico

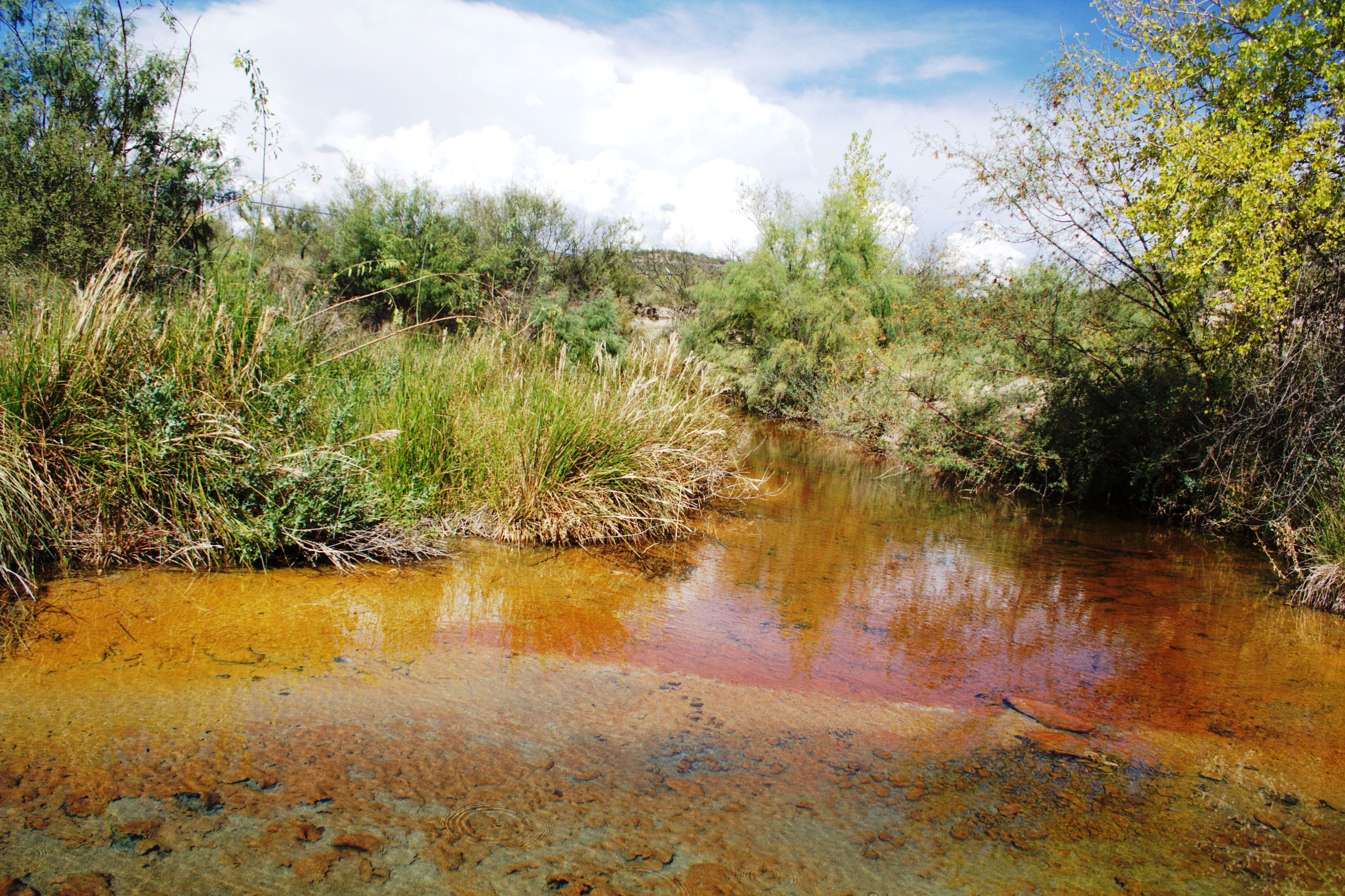
El Pandeño hotspring in Julimes, Chihuahua, Mexico

El Pandeño hotspring, officially known as "San José de Pandos", is home to the endemic Julimes pupfish (Cyprinodon julimes) considered to be one of the freshwater teleosts that lives at the highest temperatures. This spring is about 700 m^{2} (7,500 sq ft) in size and located in the Rio Conchos Basin, Chihuahua, Mexico. It is among several springs impacted by increasing pumping that depletes the local groundwater supply. The spring and its aquatic wildlife are under the custody of local NGO Amigos del Pandeño, A.C.

On November 30, 2013, an area of 368 ha (909 Acres) comprising a group of geothermal springs, including "El Pandeño" hotspring was nominated Ramsar site No. 2201: "Manantiales Geotermales de Julimes" (Geothermal Julimes Springs) by the Ramsar Convention on Wetlands on the basis of the unique ecosystems present, and its endemic organisms, including the Julimes pupfish, the isopod Thermosphaeroma macrura and the gastropod Tryonia julimensis, which have adapted to the extreme conditions which these systems present.
