= Sphaeroma terebrans =

Scientific classification
- Domain: Eukaryota
- Kingdom: Animalia
- Phylum: Arthropoda
- Class: Malacostraca
- Order: Isopoda
- Family: Sphaeromatidae
- Genus: Sphaeroma
- Species: S. terebrans

Binomial name
- Sphaeroma terebrans Bate, 1866

Synonyms
- Sphaeroma destructor Richardson, 1897; Sphaeroma vastator Bate, 1866

Species of crustacean

Sphaeroma terebrans is a mangrove-boring isopod, first described by Spence Bate in 1866. It is 8–10 millimetres (0.31–0.39 in) long, and is thought to have been introduced to North America by wooden-hulled ships. The isopod is found throughout the Gulf of Mexico mainly in mangrove swamps of Louisiana and Florida. S. terebrans will also bore into boats, wooden pilings and other wooden structures.

The burrowing activities of Sphaeroma terebrans hinder the growth of mangroves, and its wood boring activities limits mangroves to the upper limits of the intertidal zone.

== Identification ==
It is generally described to be a reddish-brown color with a semicircular head. It has a convex and elliptical body, being about twice as long as it is wide. Due to phenotypic plasticity, it is difficult to estimate the population of the species. However, it is possible to use DNA analysis of the mitochondrial COI gene for the identification of S. terebrans. It is also known that S. terebrans has 13 protein-coding genes with 3 stop codons and 6 start codons. Gene flow levels are low and diversity levels are very high in environments close to each other and ones that are very similar to each other. Major characteristics used for identifying S. terebrans are the shape of the pleotelson and the arrangement of tubercles on the pereonites.

== Distribution & invasiveness ==
Sterebrans terebrans is known for invading areas with warm climates and subtropical and tropical waters. Regions include Africa (Nigeria, South Africa), Florida, Venezuela, Cuba, and the Panama Canal. They are typically found in the intertidal zones of the red mangrove. These isopods are often introduced unintentionally via ships. They are primarily found in mangroves but have also made appearances in salt marshes, rotten wood, man-made structures, and free-hanging aerial roots. Though the mangrove and the isopod have a non-symbiotic relationship, there are both consequences and advantages for the mangroves and the surrounding environment. S. terebrans helps to regulate the growth of the mangroves and aids in recycling dead wood. However, the isopod has also been linked to catastrophic damage to the mangrove population such as reduced root production, increased root atrophy, and nutrient deficiencies. This damage is described as ecologically catastrophic, meaning there is a natural imbalance due to intensive destruction. For example, damage to red mangrove root systems went from approximately 20% damage to having 90% damage within a few years between two investigations. Mangroves combat this damage by putting energy and nutrients into growing lateral roots near the burrows to create a stable root structure, which shapes the mangrove islands in the intertidal zones. S. terebrans is also found sharing burrows with Limnoria species. Different wood properties affect the impact of S. terebrans through factors like density – when wood density increases, burrowing decreases due to difficulty chewing.

== Anatomy ==
The anatomy of S. terebrans is composed of a head, a chest with seven pairs of pereopods, and an abdomen with five pairs of pleopods. These pairs of pleopods are used for both respiration and swimming. The pleotelson is covered with tubercles and the head is semicircular with eyes made of many ocelli. Like other isopods, it has two pairs of antennae: antenna 1 has an 11-segment flagellum that extends to the first pereonite. Antenna 2 has a 16-segment flagellum and extends to the posterior side of the second pereonite. S. terebrans uses mandibles, cephalothorax, pleotelson, pleopods, and pereonites for burrowing.

== Characteristics ==
Though location-dependent, S. terebrans have an average length of 8–12 mm (0.31–0.47 in) and an average weight of 0.027 g, making it a really small species and thus easily adaptable to different areas. They are usually a reddish-brown color and are sexually identifiable at around 3.5 mm (0.14 in) in length. Overall, the entire life cycle is in the same mangrove. They rarely ever change their burrow sites. This fact allows for the S. terebrans to have a positive growth of the population. According to S. terebrans gut health analysis, they often opt for a detritivore diet. A detritivore diet includes feeding on decomposing organic waste that provides all nutrients needed. Fungi and wood particles were not found in gut health analysis, but they do filter feed as well.

== Burrowing ==
Burrowing into the wood, usually the mangroves, creates one that is 2–3 mm long in size and is the first step for most processes in their life cycle. However, the total length of burrows is dependent on the size of the isopods creating it. S. terebrans utilize their mandibles, cephalon, pleotelson, pleopods, and first two pereonites to create the burrow and evacuate unnecessary wood chips. These burrows provide protection from abiotic and biotic factors. The female uses her telson to block the entrance to protect the juveniles immediately after they emerge from their bodies. She uses pleopods to create a flow of water and oxygen into the burrow, meaning that one of the ends of the burrow needs to be able to have flowing water. If there is no water at least one end of the burrow, then the S. terebrans isopod will start a burrow in a new location.

== Reproduction ==
Sphaeroma terebrans utilize an internal fertilization system, meaning that fertilization occurs in the individual isopods rather than outside of the body. However, the sperm transfer from male to female is indirect using spermatophores in water currents to transport it to the females. After the burrow has been made, as described in the burrowing section, males enter the burrow to mate with the females right before leaving and moving on to their next location. Mating occurs around the time of partial molting. Maturation of the fertilized eggs occurs when they are kept in the marsupium of the oostegites (abdominal segments). Overall, the best breeding times were when the environment has high oxygen and nutrient levels, especially after rainfall, and the temperature is around 75 °F (24 °C). Post fertilization, the embryos show as egg-shaped. Over time, the limb buds appear and the embryo takes on a comma-shaped appearance with a soft, white exoskeleton. Females are able to carry up to eighty embryos during one fertilization term but only host up to twenty juveniles in the burrow. The number of embryos the female carries is dependent on the length of her body. Two broods may be produced by one female throughout the year, one in the fall and the other in the winter-to-spring transition period. It is more likely for the females born in the summer to produce in the fall session. The juveniles are kept in the burrows for a short time, usually a minimum of forty days. Through careful observations and research, embryo mortality in the development stages was not indicated.

== Research ==
Often, Sphaeroma terebrans are studied in the Indian and Atlantic Ocean populations as they originate from those regions and create a baseline for further research in the invasive regions. They are often tracked and investigated by their physical barriers during the time of the year and their life cycle and reproduction patterns. According to Baratti, et al., one piece of current research includes observing genetically different populations and the connections between spatial scale of this grouping and dispersal abilities. Owing to little to no physical barriers, the marine populations in this study demonstrated low genetic structure and high dispersal capabilities. When observing S. terebrans reproductive patterns in captivity, it was determined that S. terebrans needs the environment temperature to be around 24 °C (75 °F) for the best result of reproduction occurring within 2–4 weeks. S. terebrans experiments determined that salinity levels directly impact the reproduction and burrowing rates. The prime salinity range discovered was 4-28 parts per thousand for the best reproduction, burrowing, and growth rates. Although S. terebrans have a preferred temperature for breeding, scientists in Veli Lake, Kerala, India, with water temperatures of 27.4 to 33.2 °C (81.3 to 91.8 °F) found a negative correction regarding breeding and temperature. However, there was a positive correlation between breeding and nutrients; where nutrients were abundant, more breeding occurred. Through various research, the use of the COI gene as a DNA barcode is prevalent in current and plans for future research as it can be difficult to differentiate between S. terebrans and other Sphaeroma isopod species.
