= Natural resource protection zoning =

In recent years, communities in Massachusetts have adopted resource protection zoning (RPZ) as a tool to protect natural resources and open space. RPZ, which was originally passed in Shutesbury, Massachusetts in spring 2008, includes elements of conservation subdivision regulations and cluster development bylaws, to regulate new subdivisions of land in a manner that maximizes the protection of natural resources (wetlands, forests, agriculture lands, open space).

== Differences from traditional conservation subdivisions ==
Resource Protection zoning differs from traditional conservation subdivisions and cluster bylaws in many ways, including:

- RPZ is allowed by right, meaning that developers are not subject to a more onerous permitting process than traditional subdivisions.
- A conservation analysis is performed in accordance with subdivision regulations to ensure that critical resources on the site remain undeveloped. A minimum of 65% of the site must be left as open space, not including wetlands, steep slopes and other unbuildable areas.
- A development formula, which combines the results of the conservation analysis, is done to assess the amount of units that can be built in a development. Instead of using minimum lot size requirements (which can encourage sprawl) minimum density requirements are used to determine how many units can go into a development.
- Density bonuses are granted to developers that preserve additional open space, provide affordable housing or implement innovative wastewater management.
- Within the area of the site that is developable, there are no setback or frontage requirements or minimum lot sizes. This allows the developer flexibility in developing the site, and when it is combined with the other tools and regulations used in the bylaw, the overall impact is maximizing development potential in the most suitable areas of the site, while protecting critically important resources.

== See also ==
- 2008 in the environment
- United States environmental policy
