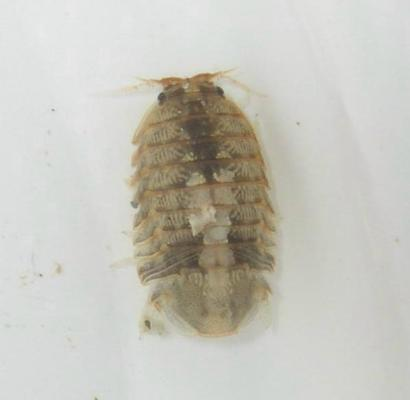
- Gnorimosphaeroma oregonense

Scientific classification
- Kingdom: Animalia
- Phylum: Arthropoda
- Class: Malacostraca
- Order: Isopoda
- Family: Sphaeromatidae
- Genus: Gnorimosphaeroma; Menzies, 1954

= Gnorimosphaeroma =

Genus of crustaceans

Gnorimosphaeroma is a genus of isopod crustaceans, containing the following species:

- Gnorimosphaeroma akanense Nunomura, 1998
- Gnorimosphaeroma albicauda Nunomura, 2005
- Gnorimosphaeroma anchialos Jang & Kwon, 1993
- Gnorimosphaeroma boninense Nunomura & Satake, 2006
- Gnorimosphaeroma chinense (Tattersall, 1921)
- Gnorimosphaeroma hachijoense Nunomura, 1999
- Gnorimosphaeroma hoestandtli Kim & Kwon, 1985
- Gnorimosphaeroma hokurikuense Nunomura, 1998
- Gnorimosphaeroma insulare (Van Name, 1940)
- Gnorimosphaeroma iriei Nunomura, 1998
- Gnorimosphaeroma izuense Nunomura, 2007
- Gnorimosphaeroma kurilense Kussakin, 1974
- Gnorimosphaeroma naktongense Kwon & Kim, 1987
- Gnorimosphaeroma noblei Menzies, 1954
- Gnorimosphaeroma oregonense (Dana, 1853)
- Gnorimosphaeroma ovatum (Gurjanova, 1933)
- Gnorimosphaeroma paradoxa (Nunomura, 1988)
- Gnorimosphaeroma pulchellum Nunomura, 1998
- Gnorimosphaeroma rayi Hoestlandt, 1969
- Gnorimosphaeroma rebunense Nunomura, 1998
- Gnorimosphaeroma rivulare Tomikawa, Yoshii & Nunomura, 2023
- Gnorimosphaeroma shikinense Nunomura, 1999
- Gnorimosphaeroma tondaense Nunomura, 1999
- Gnorimosphaeroma tsutshimaense Nunomura, 1998
