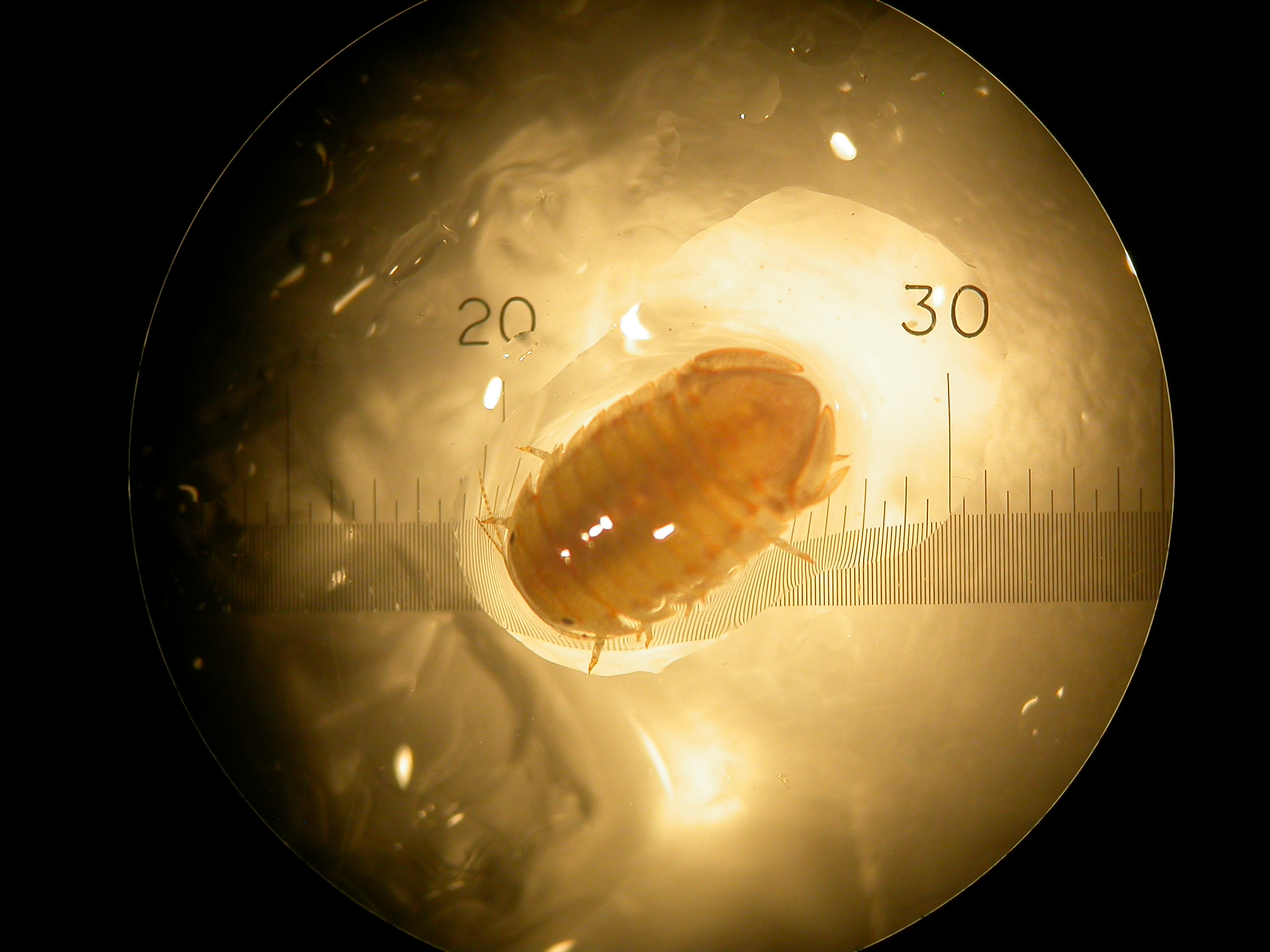
- Thermosphaeroma thermophilum

Scientific classification
- Kingdom: Animalia
- Phylum: Arthropoda
- Clade: Pancrustacea
- Class: Malacostraca
- Order: Isopoda
- Family: Sphaeromatidae
- Genus: Thermosphaeroma; Cole & Bane, 1978

Type species
- Sphaeroma dugesi Dollfus, 1893

= Thermosphaeroma =

Genus of crustaceans

Thermosphaeroma is a genus of crustacean in family Sphaeromatidae. They occur exclusively in hot springs of southwestern United States and central Mexico.

== Species ==
The genus contains eight species, most of which are listed on the IUCN Red List (EW: extinct in the wild; CR: critically endangered; EN: endangered; LC; least concern; NE: not evaluated):

Species	Authority	Year	IUCN status	Distribution
Thermosphaeroma cavicauda	Bowman	1985	CR	Mexico
Thermosphaeroma dugesi	(Dollfus)	1893	CR	Mexico
Thermosphaeroma macrura	Bowman	1985	CR	Mexico
Thermosphaeroma mendozai	Schotte	2000	NE	Mexico
Thermosphaeroma milleri	Bowman	1981	EN	Mexico
Thermosphaeroma smithi	Bowman	1981	CR	Mexico
Thermosphaeroma subequalum	Cole & Bane	1978	LC	Mexico, United States
Thermosphaeroma thermophilum	(Richardson)	1897	EW	United States
