= Maricoccus brucei =

Scientific classification
- Kingdom: Animalia
- Phylum: Arthropoda
- Clade: Pancrustacea
- Class: Malacostraca
- Order: Isopoda
- Family: Sphaeromatidae
- Genus: Maricoccus; Poore, 1994
- Species: M. brucei

Binomial name
- Maricoccus brucei Poore, 1994

Species of crustacean

Maricoccus brucei is a species of marine isopod, endemic to Southern Australia. It is the only member of the monotypic genus Maricoccus. They were named after Niel Bruce for his contributions to the taxonomy of Australian isopods.

== Distribution ==
They are found in the shallow coastal regions (10 to 50 meters) of Southern Australia and Tasmania, on Red algae, Bryozoans and Sea grasses.

== Description ==
Members of this species can grow up to 4.6 millimetres (0.18 in), with the body being about 1.5 times as long as it is wide. They have a deep purple coloration.
