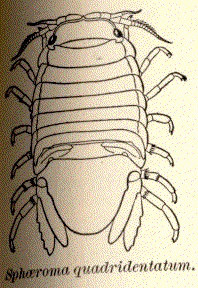

Scientific classification
- Kingdom: Animalia
- Phylum: Arthropoda
- Class: Malacostraca
- Order: Isopoda
- Family: Sphaeromatidae
- Genus: Sphaeroma
- Species: S. quadridentatum

Binomial name
- Sphaeroma quadridentatum Say, 1818

= Sphaeroma quadridentatum =

Species of crustacean

Sphaeroma quadridentatum, the sea pill bug, is a species of isopod in the family Sphaeromatidae.
