= Bighead pupfish =

Cachorrito cabezon

Conservation status
- Critically Endangered (IUCN 3.1)

Scientific classification
- Kingdom: Animalia
- Phylum: Chordata
- Class: Actinopterygii
- Order: Cyprinodontiformes
- Family: Cyprinodontidae
- Genus: Cyprinodon
- Species: C. pachycephalus

Binomial name
- Cyprinodon pachycephalus W. L. Minckley & C. O. Minckley, 1986

Species of fish

The bighead pupfish (Cyprinodon pachycephalus), known in Spanish as cachorrito cabezon, is a critically endangered species of pupfish in the family Cyprinodontidae. It is endemic to an area covering less than 1 km^{2} (0.4 sq mi) at San Diego de Alcala in the Conchos River basin, Chihuahua of Mexico. It lives in hot springs, their outflows and an impoundment pool in water that ranges at least from 25 to 49 °C (77–120 °F).

== See also ==
- Cyprinodon julimes – a related pupfish that also lives in hot springs in Mexico
