= Dynoides =

Scientific classification
- Kingdom: Animalia
- Phylum: Arthropoda
- Class: Malacostraca
- Order: Isopoda
- Family: Sphaeromatidae
- Genus: Dynoides; Barnard, 1914

Synonyms
- Clianella Boone, 1923; Dynoidella Pillai, 1965

Genus of crustaceans

Dynoides is a genus of marine isopods in the family Sphaeromatidae.

== Species ==
The genus contains the following species:

- Dynoides amblysinus (Pillai, 1954)
- Dynoides artocanalis Nunomura, 1997
- Dynoides barnardii Baker, 1928
- Dynoides bicolor Nunomura, 2010
- Dynoides brevicornis Kussakin & Malyutina, 1987
- Dynoides brevispina Bruce, 1980
- Dynoides canadensis Khalaji-Pirbalouty & Gagnon, 2021
- Dynoides castroi Loyola e Silva, 1960
- Dynoides crenulatus Carvacho & Haasmann, 1984
- Dynoides daguilarensis Li, 2000
- Dynoides dentisinus Shen, 1929
- Dynoides elegans (Boone, 1923)
- Dynoides globicauda (Dana, 1853)
- Dynoides indicus Müller, 1991
- Dynoides longisinus Kwon, 1990
- Dynoides saldani Carvacho & Haasmann, 1984
- Dynoides serratisinus Barnard, 1914
- Dynoides spinipodus Kwon & Kim, 1986
- Dynoides viridis Bruce, 1982
