= Pronatura México =

Mexican environmental conservation group

Pronatura México is the largest Mexican environmental conservation group. Founded in 1981, the organization covers 32 Mexican states, being now composed of 6 regional representations, which are:

- Pronatura, A.C.
- Pronatura Chiapas
- Pronatura Noreste
- Pronatura Noroeste
- Pronatura Península de Yucatán
- Pronatura Veracruz

These non government, nonprofit organizations share the mission of the conservation of the flora, fauna and priority ecosystems of Mexico, promoting society's development in harmony with nature. The logo, which represents a horned guan, was 'modernized' in 2006, due to the celebration of the 25th anniversary of Pronatura, keeping the horned guan, but giving it a more stylized image.

In addition to the geographic division of its conservation work, Pronatura bases its programs on Strategic Lines of Action, which are:

- Conservation and sustainable management of priority ecosystems
- Environmental education and strategic communication
- Community sustainable development
- Environmental policy and management
- Production and management of information
- Institutional development

Pronatura has a number of donors and partners, both in Mexico and internationally. This has helped Pronatura grow to be conformed by more than 500 individuals, amongst board members (both national and regional) and staff, and achieve a yearly conservation investment of over 10 million dollars.

There are four national programs, shared by all six Pronaturas with a national coordination. These are:

- Private Lands Conservation Program
- Pronatura's Centers for Conservation Information
- National Wetlands Program
- National Bird Program

== See also ==
- Conservation biology
- Conservation movement
- Environmentalism
- Environmental movement
- Habitat conservation
- List of environmental organizations
- Sustainability
