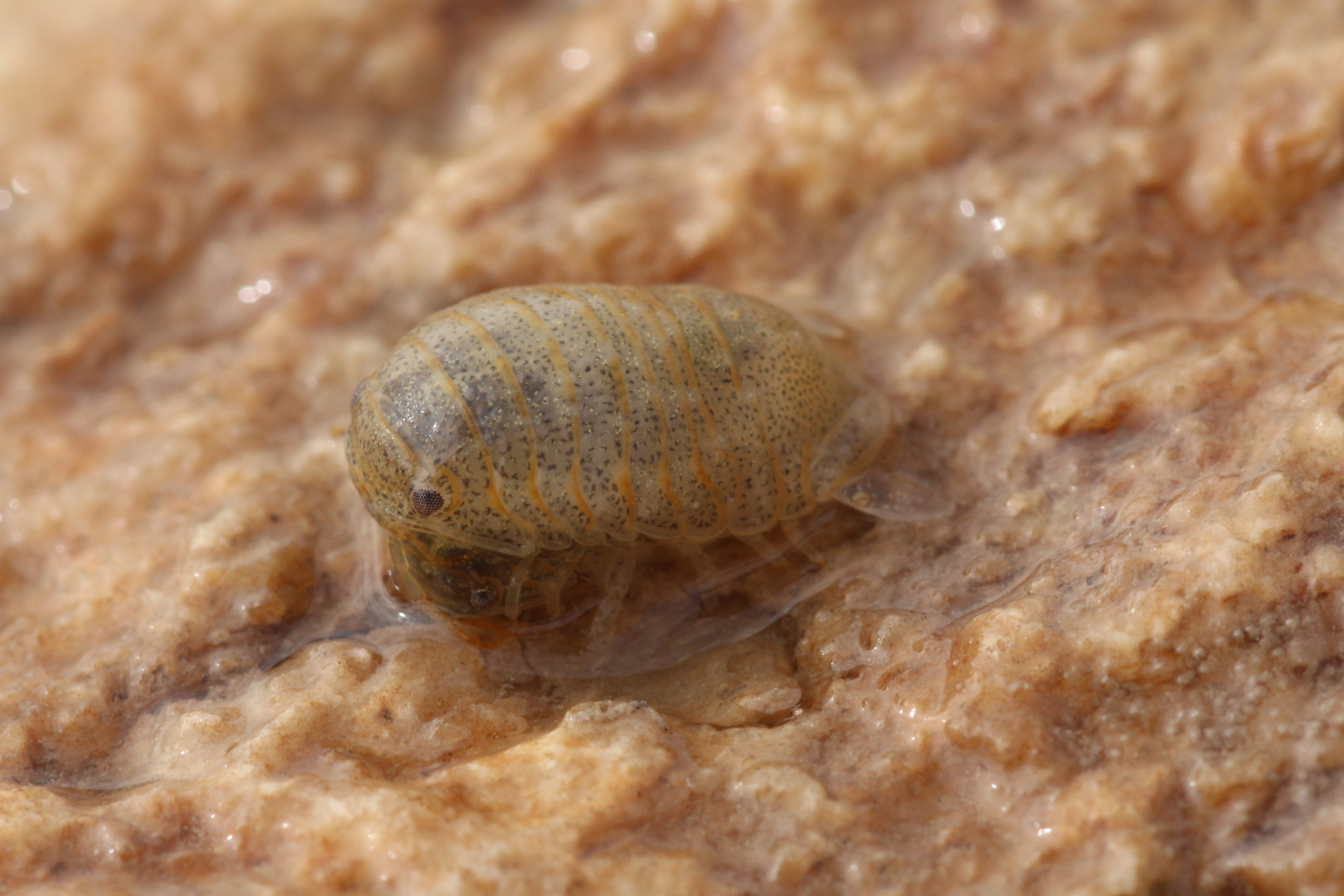
- Sphaeroma serratum

Scientific classification
- Kingdom: Animalia
- Phylum: Arthropoda
- Class: Malacostraca
- Order: Isopoda
- Family: Sphaeromatidae
- Genus: Sphaeroma; Bosc, 1802

= Sphaeroma =

Genus of crustaceans

Sphaeroma is a genus of aquatic isopod crustaceans, part of the family Sphaeromatidae.

== Species ==
The genus contains the following species:

- Sphaeroma annandalei
- Sphaeroma bigranulatum
- Sphaeroma boryi
- Sphaeroma conglobator
- Sphaeroma curtum
- Sphaeroma dumerilii
- Sphaeroma emarginatum
- Sphaeroma exosphaeroma
- Sphaeroma felix
- Sphaeroma gasparellai
- Sphaeroma gayi
- Sphaeroma globicauda
- Sphaeroma granti
- Sphaeroma intermedium
- Sphaeroma laevigatum
- Sphaeroma laurensi
- Sphaeroma mukaii
- Sphaeroma papillae
- Sphaeroma pentodon
- Sphaeroma peruvianum
- Sphaeroma plumosa
- Sphaeroma podicipitis
- Sphaeroma prideauxianum
- Sphaeroma propinqua
- Sphaeroma quadridentatum
- Sphaeroma quoianum
- Sphaeroma retrolaeve
- Sphaeroma rotundicaudum
- Sphaeroma serratum
- Sphaeroma shimantoensis
- Sphaeroma sieboldii
- Sphaeroma silvai
- Sphaeroma sinensis
- Sphaeroma taborans
- Sphaeroma terebrans
- Sphaeroma tomentosum
- Sphaeroma triste
- Sphaeroma tuberculata
- Sphaeroma tuberculatum
- Sphaeroma wadai
- Sphaeroma walkeri
- Sphaeroma venustissimum
