= Pronatura Noreste =

Mexican nonprofit organization

Pronatura Noreste is a Mexican nongovernmental, nonprofit organization recognized by the National Council of Science and Technology as a scientific and educational organization. Pronatura Noreste is one of six regional offices of the Pronatura México, and has its headquarters in Monterrey, Nuevo León. It also has offices in Matamoros, Tamaulipas; Cuatro Ciénegas, Coahuila; San Rafael, Nuevo León; Janos, Chihuahua; and Ciudad Victoria, Tamaulipas.

The organization was created in 1998 by an executive board of trustees committed to nature conservation.

Its mission is the conservation of flora, fauna and priority ecosystems of northeastern Mexico by promoting society's development in harmony with nature.

== Conservation approach ==
Pronatura Noreste's projects are based on an ecoregional focus, expanding over the territorial limits determined by states and countries, with special attention on priority sites and the most fragile habitats, species and biodiversity. Its four ecoregional programs are:

- Chihuahuan Desert
- Sierra Madre Oriental (Eastern Sierra Madre mountain range)
- Tamaulipan and Wetlands Ecoregions (includes Laguna Madre)
- Sierra Madre Occidental (Western Sierra Madre mountain range)

The environmental organization currently has conservation projects in the states of Tamaulipas, Nuevo León, Coahuila, Chihuahua and San Luis Potosí.

Pronatura Noreste owns three private reserves. The first property it acquired was Pozas Azules Private Reserve, in Cuatro Ciénegas, Coahuila. Inside the 6,600-acre (27 km^{2}) property are 35% of the valley's pools. The organization has restored wetlands, protected species such as stromatolites, and does community work in the region. In 2005, Pronatura Noreste became owner of a 46,000-acre (190 km^{2}) ranch in Janos, Chihuahua. The grasslands of El Uno Private Reserve have recovered ever since, and Pronatura is promoting the legal protection of the region of Janos. In 2006, it purchased Cueva de la Boca, a cave near Monterrey that is home to a large population of Mexican free-tailed bats. This northeastern Mexican environmental conservation organization uses other legal tools to protect land in addition to outright purchase, such as conservation easements and the acquisition of water rights.

Some of the flagship species protected by Pronatura Noreste are the Mexican prairie dog, black-tailed prairie dog, American black bear, piping plover, long-billed curlew, maroon-fronted parrot, thick-billed parrot, and ocelot.

== Funding ==
Pronatura Noreste's projects receives financial funding from organizations such as CONABIO, the Dallas Zoo, the Environmental Defense Fund, Ford Motor Company, Fondo Mexicano para la Conservación de la Naturaleza, General Motors, the William and Flora Hewlett Foundation, the World Wide Fund for Nature, The Nature Conservancy, Treviño Elizondo A.B.P., the United States Agency for International Development and the United States Fish and Wildlife Service, as well as some Mexican corporate industrial groups, such as CEMEX and ALFA. It also has a number of individual donors, both Mexican and foreign.

== See also ==
- Group of 100
