= Julimes =

Town in the Mexican state of Chihuahua

- Town
- Location in Mexico
- Coordinates: 28°26′N 105°24′W
- Country: Mexico
- State: Chihuahua
- Municipality: Julimes

Population (2010)
  - Total: 1,795

Julimes is a town and seat of the municipality of Julimes, in the northern Mexican state of Chihuahua. As of 2010, the town of Julimes had a population of 1,795, up from 1,756 as of 2005.

The community is adjacent to the east bank of a north-flowing section of the Rio Conchos.
