= CONAGUA =

Mexican federal agency

Decentralized administrative body overview
- Formed: 16 January 1985
- Headquarters: Coyoacán, Mexico City
- Annual budget: $41 billion (2013 pesos)
- Decentralized administrative body executive: Efraín Morales López
- Parent department: SEMARNAT
- Child Decentralized administrative body: National Meteorological Service
- Website: www.conagua.gob.mx

The National Water Commission (Comisión Nacional del Agua, CONAGUA) is a decentralized administrative body of the Secretariat of Environment and Natural Resources (SEMARNAT) charged with managing, regulating, controlling, and protecting national waters in Mexico. The National Meteorological Service (SMN) is part of its structure.

It was created by decree by President Carlos Salinas de Gortari in 1989.

== History ==
Currently, the mission of the National Water Commission is to manage and preserve national waters, with the participation of society, to achieve the sustainable use of the resource. The Commission emphasizes the inclusion of societal participation in implementing its objectives.

For the safekeeping of its documentation, it has the Historical Archive and Central Water Library.

Its main actions include: supporting basin organizations and local directorates in carrying out the necessary actions to achieve the sustainable use of water in each region of the country, establishing national water policy and strategies, integrating the institution's budget and monitoring its application, arranging with national and international financial organizations the loans required by the water sector, establishing programs to support municipalities in the provision of drinking water and sanitation services in cities and rural communities and to promote the efficient use of water in irrigation and industry.

The central offices also establish the policy for collection and oversight of water rights and discharge permits, coordinate the necessary modifications to the National Water Law and support its application in the country, develop regulations on hydraulic matters, operate the national meteorological service, maintain a solid and fruitful relationship with the Congress of the Union, attend to the national media and liaise with federal agencies to work together on actions that benefit the water sector.

== Site ==
CONAGUA's headquarters are located at Avenida Insurgentes Sur No. 2416, Copilco El Bajo, Coyoacán, 04340 Mexico City.
