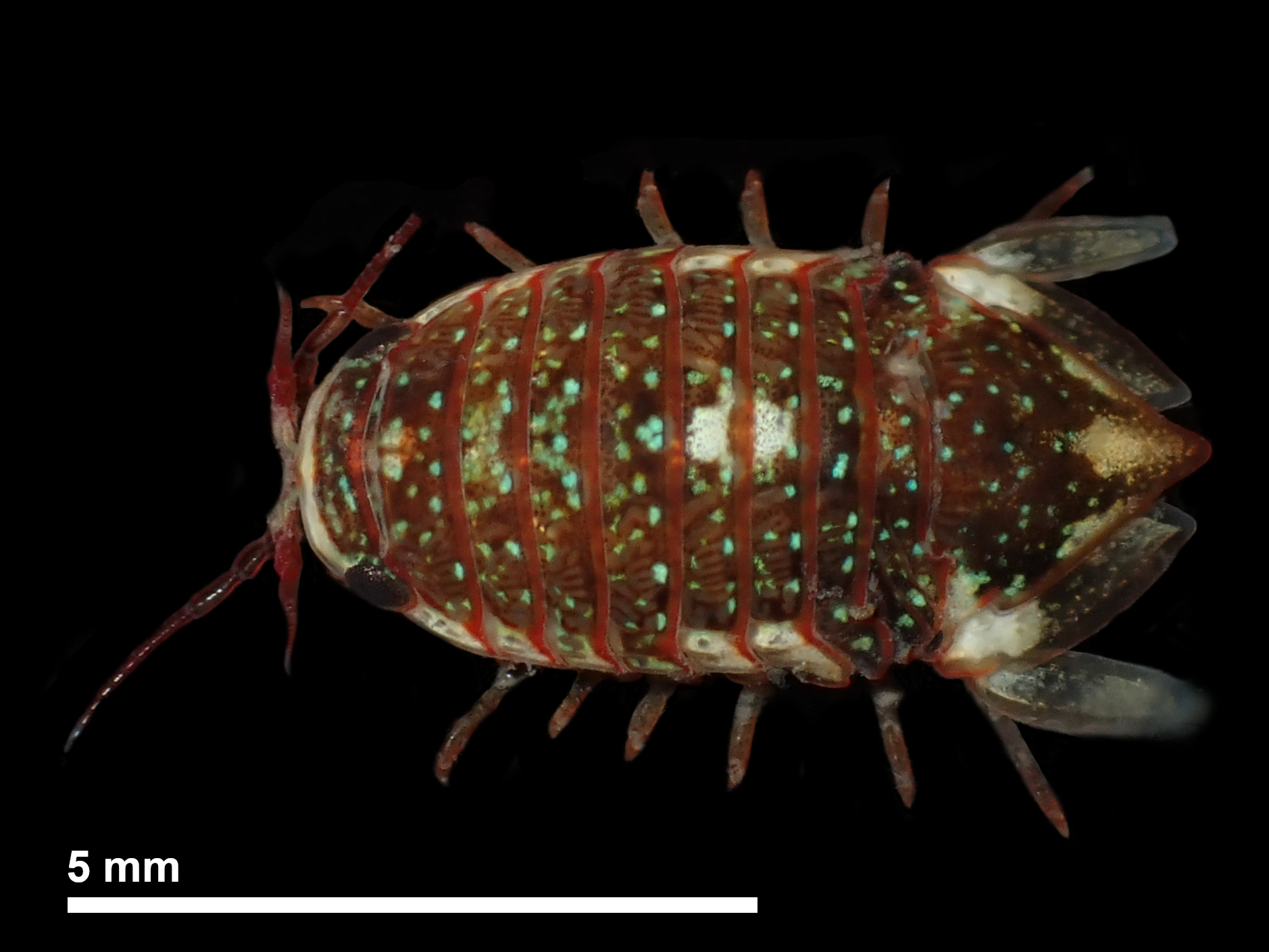
- Exosphaeroma echinensis

Scientific classification
- Kingdom: Animalia
- Phylum: Arthropoda
- Clade: Pancrustacea
- Class: Malacostraca
- Order: Isopoda
- Suborder: Sphaeromatidea
- Superfamily: Sphaeromatoidea
- Family: Sphaeromatidae; Latreille, 1825

Type genus
- Sphaeroma

= Sphaeromatidae =

Family of isopods

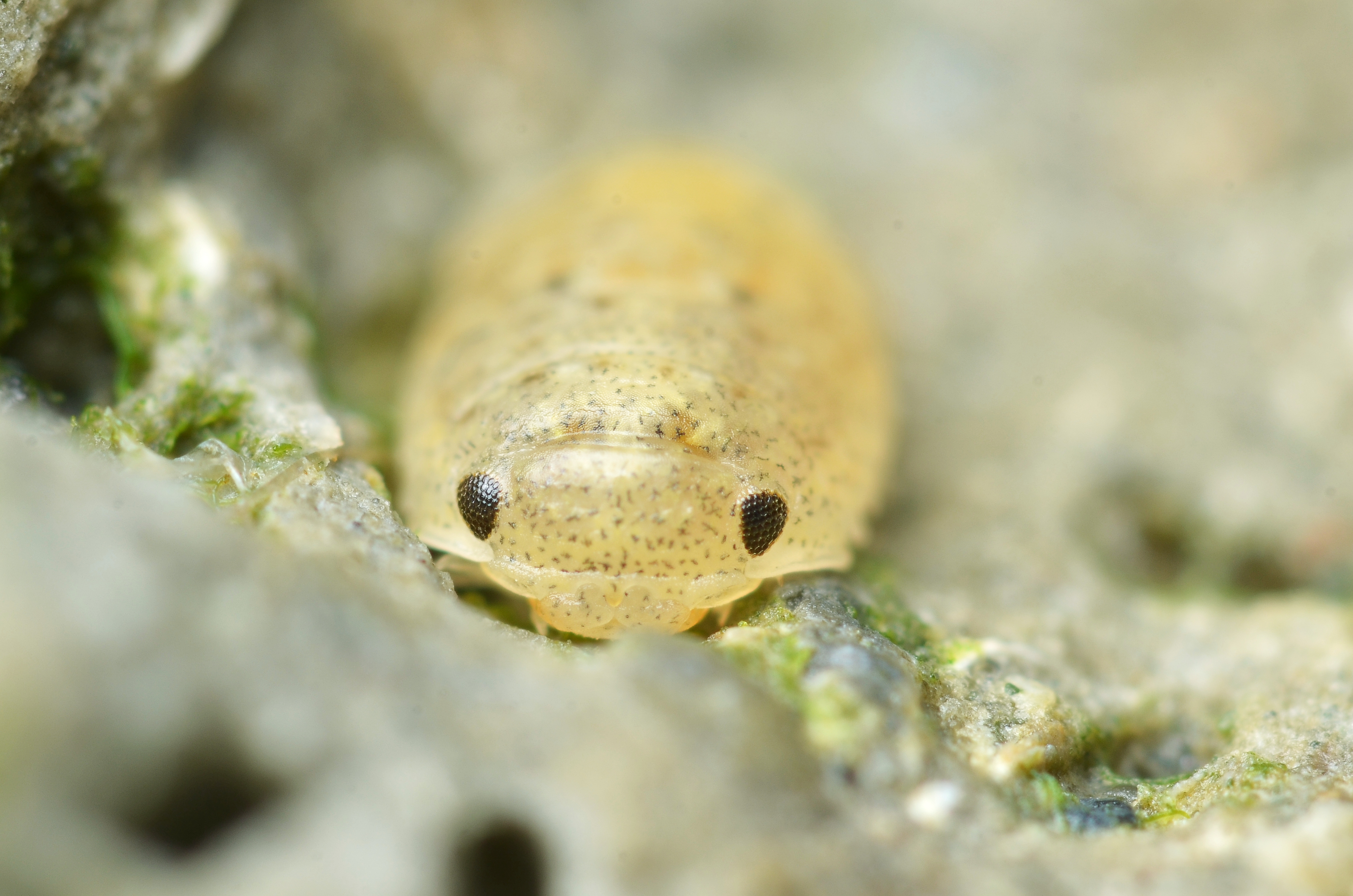
Lekanesphaera rugicauda ?

Sphaeromatidae, the seapills, is a family of marine isopods commonly encountered in shallow temperate waters worldwide. Many species can curl up into a ball similar to terrestrial pillbugs. The family is extremely diverse, containing over 700 species in over 100 genera.

== Description ==
Like terrestrial pillbugs, many seapills can curl up into a ball, although some species are flattened and scale-like. Due to the sheer diversity of the family, finding traits present across all seapills and none of their relatives is difficult, but they can be told from other sphaeromatidean families by the lack of fusion between the head and first pereon segment and the fusion of the inner branch of the uropods to the base (functionally making the appendage 1 branched or uniramous). Many less-visible features are also distinct, such as the grinding multitoothed incisors on the mandibles, elongate maxilliped endite (rectangular "plate" set distally on base) with a narrow pointed tip fringed with many robust and simple setae, and a simple, non-grasping first set of walking legs (pereopod 1).

== Ecology ==
Seapills are often encountered on rocky shores and in shelf waters in temperate zones. They are mainly are browsers or detritus feeders. The species Xynosphaera colemani has incisory mandibles and burrows into the tissue of alcyonacean corals. Some genera of Sphaeromatidae associate with sponges, particularly Oxinasphaera.

== Genera ==
The family Sphaeromatidae contains 701 species in 106 genera.

The family contains the following genera:

- Afrocerceis Müller, 1995
- Agostodina Bruce, 1994
- Amphoroidea H. Milne-Edwards, 1840
- Amphoroidella Baker, 1908
- Apemosphaera Bruce, 1994
- †Archaeosphaeroma Novák, 1872
- Artopoles Barnard, 1920
- Austrasphaera Bruce, 2003
- Beatricesphaera Wetzer & Bruce, 1999
- Benthosphaera Bruce, 1994
- Bilistra Sket & Bruce, 2004
- Botryias Richardson, 1910
- Bregmotypta Bruce, 1994
- Caecocassidias Kussakin, 1967
- Caecosphaeroma Dollfus, 1896
- Calcipila Harrison & Holdich, 1984
- Campecopea Leach, 1814
- Cassidias Richardson, 1906
- Cassidina H. Milne-Edwards, 1840
- Cassidinella Whitelegge, 1901
- Cassidinidea Hansen, 1905
- Cassidinopsis Hansen, 1905
- Ceratocephalus Woodward, 1877
- Cerceis H. Milne-Edwards, 1840
- Cercosphaera Bruce, 1994
- Chitonopsis Whitelegge, 1902
- Chitonosphaera Kussakin & Malyutina, 1993
- Cilicaea Leach, 1818
- Cilicaeopsis Hansen, 1905
- Cliamenella Kussakin & Malyutina, 1987
- †Cyclosphaeroma Woodward, 1890
- Cymodetta Bowman & Kuhne, 1974
- Cymodoce Leach, 1814
- Cymodocella Pfeffer, 1887
- Cymodopsis Baker, 1926
- Diclidocella Bruce, 1995
- Discerceis Richardson, 1905
- Discidina Bruce, 1994
- Dynamene Leach, 1814
- Dynamenella Hansen, 1905
- Dynameniscus Richardson, 1905
- Dynamenoides Hurley & Jansen, 1977
- Dynamenopsis Baker, 1908
- Dynoides Barnard, 1914
- †Eocopea Iverson & Chivers, 1984
- †Eosphaeroma Woodward, 1879
- Eterocerceis Messana, 1990
- Exocerceis Baker, 1926
- Exosphaeroides Holdich & Harrison, 1983
- Exosphaeroma Stebbing, 1900
- Geocerceis Menzies & Glynn, 1968
- Gnorimosphaeroma Menzies, 1954
- Harrieta Kensley, 1987
- Haswellia Miers, 1884
- Hemisphaeroma Hansen, 1905
- Heterodina Schotte & Kensley, 2005
- †Heterosphaeroma Munier-Chalmas, 1872
- Holotelson Richardson, 1909
- Ischyromene Racovitza, 1908
- Isocladus Miers, 1876
- †Isopodites von Ammon, 1882
- Juletta Bruce, 1993
- Koremasphaera Bruce, 2003
- Kranosphaera Bruce, 1992
- Lekanesphaera Verhoeff, 1943
- Leptosphaeroma Hilgendorf, 1885
- Makarasphaera Bruce, 2005
- Margueritta Bruce, 1993
- Maricoccus Poore, 1994
- Merozoon Sket, 2012
- Monolistra Gerstaecker, 1856
- Moruloidea Baker, 1908
- Naesicopea Stebbing, 1893
- Neonaesa Harrison & Holdich, 1982
- Neosphaeroma Baker, 1926
- Oxinasphaera Bruce, 1997
- Paracassidina Baker, 1911
- Paracassidinopsis Nobili, 1906
- Paracerceis Hansen, 1905
- Paracilicaea Stebbing, 1910
- Paradella Harrison & Holdich, 1982
- Paraimene Javed & Ahmed, 1988
- Paraleptosphaeroma Buss & Iverson, 1981
- Parasphaeroma Stebbing, 1902
- Parisocladus Barnard, 1914
- Pedinura Bruce, 2003
- Pistorius Harrison & Holdich, 1982
- Platycerceis Baker, 1926
- Platynympha Harrison, 1984
- Platysphaera Holdich & Harrison, 1981
- Pooredoce Bruce, 2009
- †Protosphaeroma Bachmayer, 1949
- Pseudocerceis Harrison & Holdich, 1982
- Pseudosphaeroma Chilton, 1909
- Ptyosphaera Holdich & Harrison, 1983
- Scutuloidea Chilton, 1883
- Sphaeramene Barnard, 1914
- Sphaeroma Latreille, 1802
- Sphaeromopsis Holdich & Jones, 1973
- Stathmos Barnard, 1940
- Striella Glynn, 1968
- Syncassidina Baker, 1928
- Thermosphaeroma Cole & Bane, 1978
- Tholozodium Eleftheriou, Holdich & Harrison, 1980
- †Triassphaeroma Basso & Tintori, 1995
- Waiteolana Baker, 1926
- Xynosphaera Bruce, 1994
- Zuzara Leach, 1818

== See also ==
- Sphaeroma terebrans
