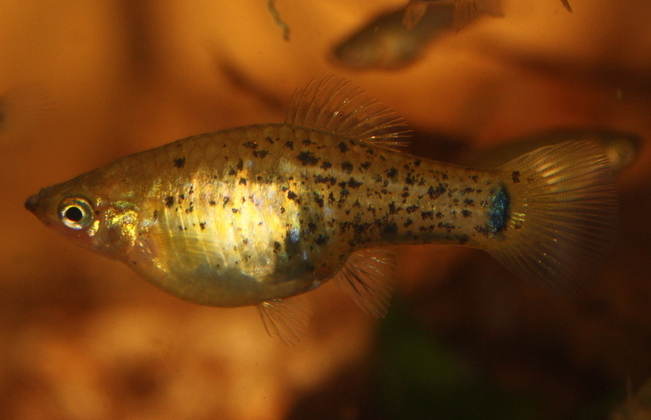
- A female
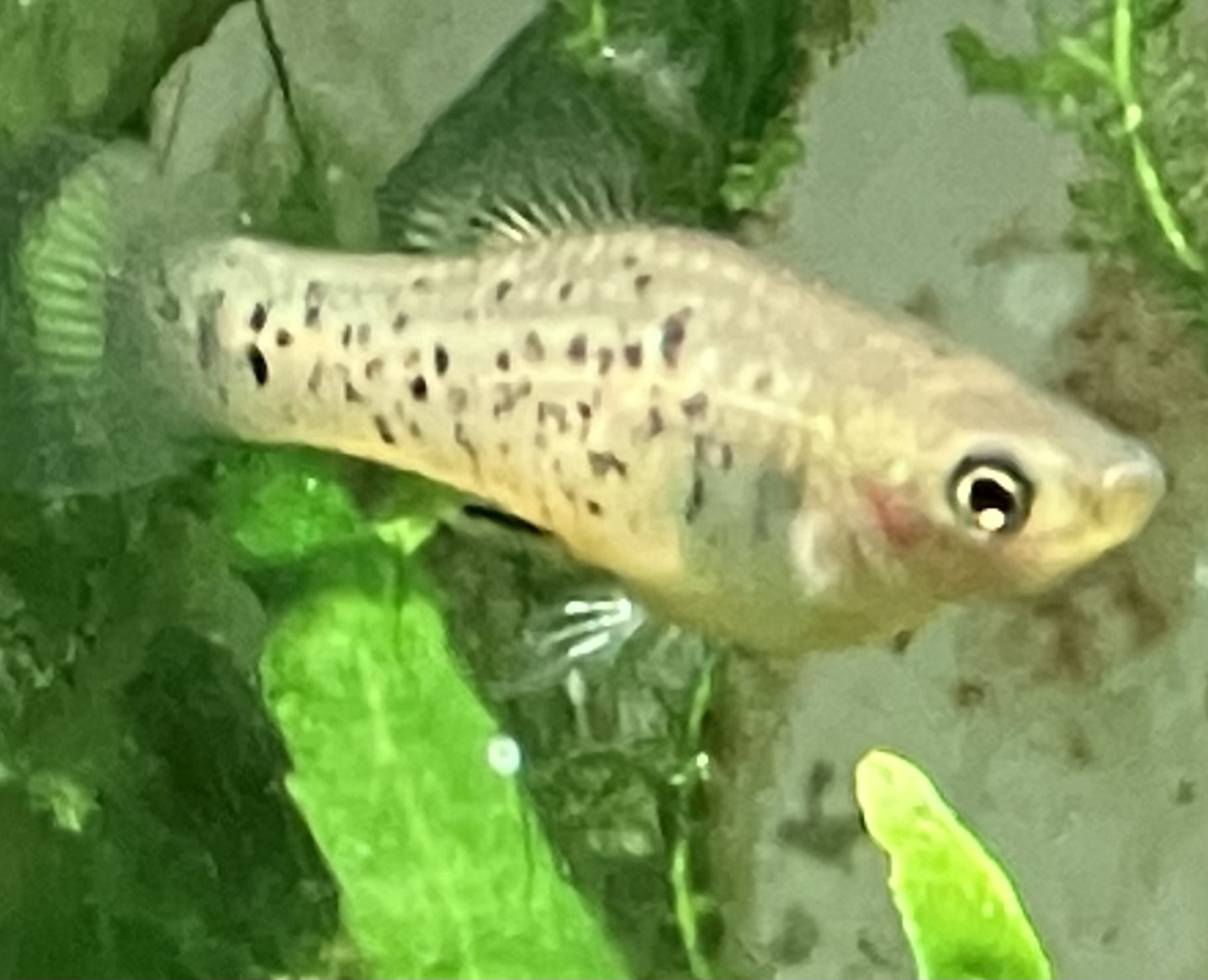
- A male

Conservation status
- Data Deficient (IUCN 3.1)

Scientific classification
- Kingdom: Animalia
- Phylum: Chordata
- Class: Actinopterygii
- Order: Cyprinodontiformes
- Family: Poeciliidae
- Genus: Xiphophorus
- Species: X. milleri

Binomial name
- Xiphophorus milleri D. E. Rosen, 1960

= Xiphophorus milleri =

Catemaco platyfish

Species of fish

Xiphophorus milleri, the Catemaco platyfish, is a poeciliid fish endemic to Mexico's Lake Catemaco and its tributaries. As it has traits of both swordtails and platies, its discovery confirmed that these two groups should be consolidated into a single genus, Xiphophorus.

== Taxonomy ==
The species was named after American ichthyologist Robert Rush Miller, who collected it along with other Xiphophorus species. Its discovery enabled scientists to definitely conclude that platies and swordtails should be classified in the same genus, for it combines traits that were thought to separate platies from swordtails into different genera. Namely, X. milleri resembles the swordtails in body shape, pigmentation, and ecology, but shares the platies' secondary sexual characteristics, pigmentary polymorphism, and the absence of a sword.

== Description ==
Xiphophorus milleri is a small to medium Xiphophorus species. Its body is slender. Nearly a half of specimens have melanophore markings of varying sizes. These are arranged in one of two types of patterns: irregular dark spots on the body; and definite rows of spots on the side. Three tail patterns exist: one with a single small spot (similar to those of X. variatus and X. maculatus), one with a single large spot (similar to that of some X. variatus specimens), and a bar-like pattern (similar to those of X. montezumae and X. pygmaeus). Adult males have deep yellow-orange bellies.

Females grow to 4.5 cm (1.8 in) total length, while males attain 2.5 cm (0.98 in). The males are elongated, while the females appear humpbacked and compact.

== Distribution and habitat ==
Xiphophorus milleri was discovered in a steep-banked stream flowing into Lake Catemaco in Mexico. It prefers clear or white water habitats with sparse green algae growth on a substrate of mostly sand and silt with occasional rocks. X. helleri is found in the same habitat. It appears to be restricted to Lake Catemaco and its tributaries.

== Reproduction ==
Xiphophorus milleri is a livebearer; the female gives birth every 24 to 28 days. The size of each brood normally ranges from 15 to 50 fry. Filial cannibalism is rare.

== Bibliography ==
- Axelrod, Herbert R.; Wischnath, Lothar (1991). Swordtails and Platies. TFH Publications. ISBN 0-86622-090-9.
- Rosen, Donn Eric (1960). "Middle-American poeciliid fishes of the genus Xiphophorus". Bulletin of the Florida State Museum, Biological Sciences. 5 (4). University of Florida: 90–92.
