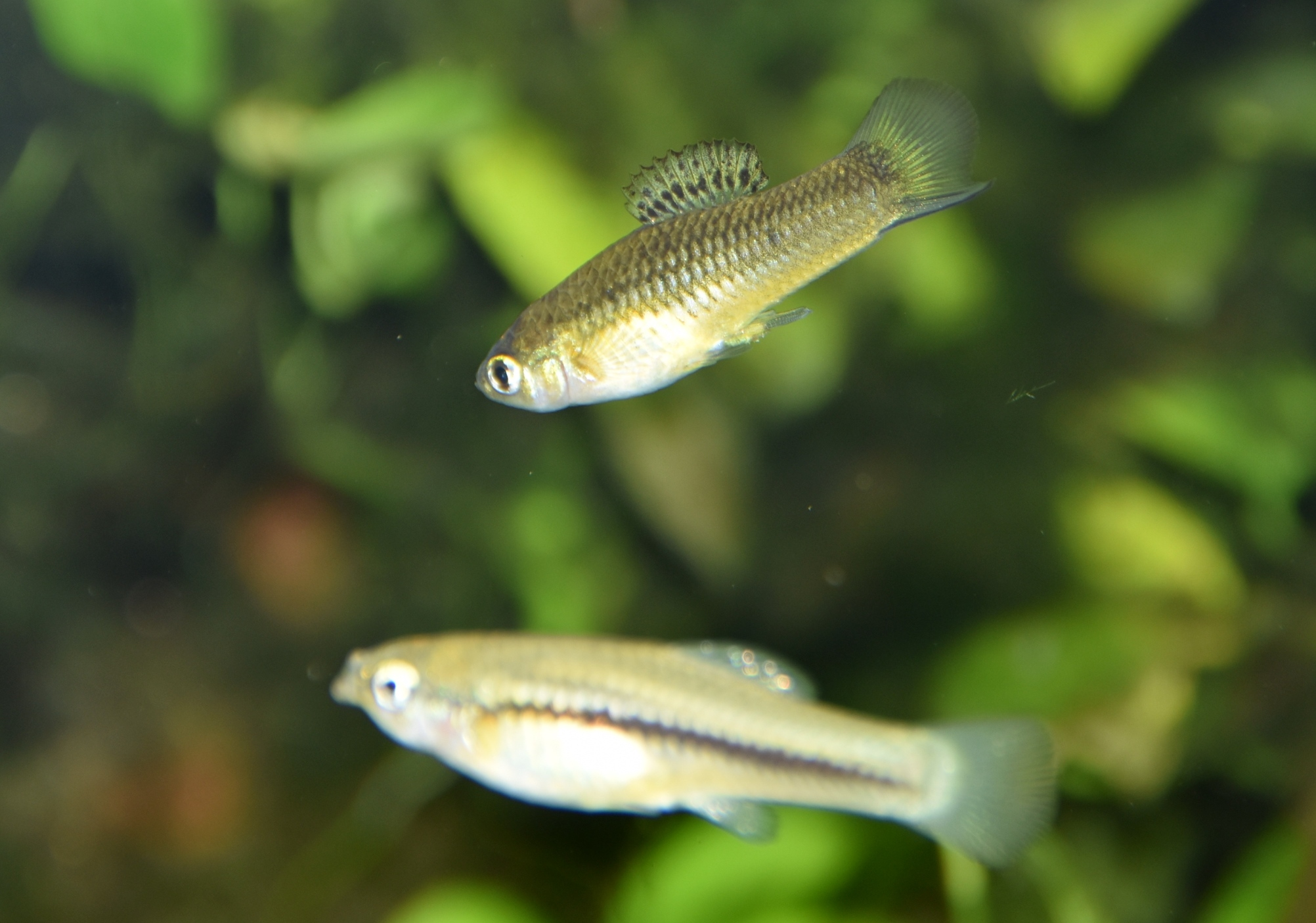
- Male (top) and female (bottom)

Conservation status
- Data Deficient (IUCN 3.1)

Scientific classification
- Kingdom: Animalia
- Phylum: Chordata
- Class: Actinopterygii
- Order: Cyprinodontiformes
- Family: Poeciliidae
- Genus: Xiphophorus
- Species: X. cortezi

Binomial name
- Xiphophorus cortezi D. E. Rosen, 1960

= Xiphophorus cortezi =

Delicate swordtail

Species of fish

Xiphophorus cortezi, the delicate swordtail, is a species of poeciliid fish from Mexico.

Named after the Spanish conquistador Hernán Cortés, Xiphophorus cortezi was originally described in 1960 by Donn Eric Rosen as a subspecies of X. montezumae. It was well known in literature prior to the formal scientific description. The smaller males of X. cortezi are similar to the larger males of X. nigrensis, pointing to a close evolutionary relationship with this species too.

Adult size is variable and averages about 30 mm in standard length. The color of the male, especially the midlateral stripe, depends on the excitement of the fish and background shade of its environment. Some specimens kept in the laboratory for years have shown such silvery coloring that black markings became absent. Different patterns of black spots on the tail exist.

Xiphophorus cortezi is found in the upper Rio Panuco system in northeastern Mexico. Two congeners, X. pygmaeus and X. variatus, are found in the same section of Rio Axtla, a tributary of Rio Panuco, but the species are nearly always separated into different ecological niches.
