= Platy (fish) =

Defunct genus of freshwater fish

Platy is a common name of freshwater fish in the genus Xiphophorus that lack a "sword" at the bottom of their tails. This species is a livebearer, similar to other fish of the family Poeciliidae, such as the guppy and molly. Platies are native to the east coast of Central America and southern Mexico.

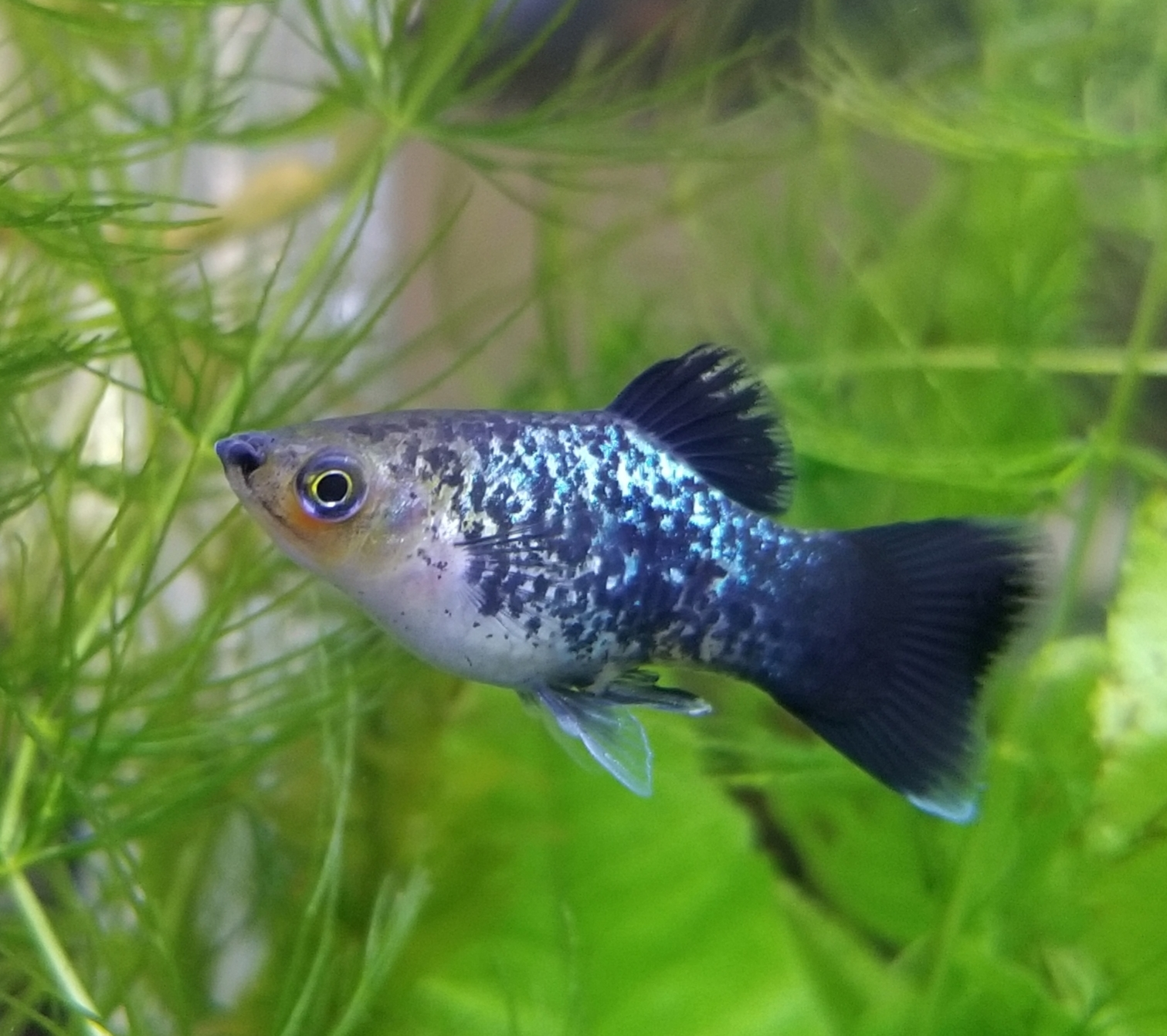
Rainbow Platy (male)

The two species, the southern platyfish and the variatus platy, have been interbred to the point where they are difficult to distinguish. Most platies now sold in aquariums are hybrids of both species.

== Platy ==
The platy (Xiphophorus maculatus) grows to a maximum overall length of 7.0 cm (2.8 in). Sexual dimorphism is slight, the male's caudal fin being more pointed. The anal fin of the male fish has evolved into a gonopodium, a stick-shaped organ used for reproduction. The female southern platyfish's anal fin is fan-shaped. Wild varieties are drab in coloration, lacking the distinctive dark lateral line common to many Xiphophorus species. Platies can have from 20–50 fry (baby fish) at once, as often as once a month. They may also eat their own young.

== Variable platyfish ==
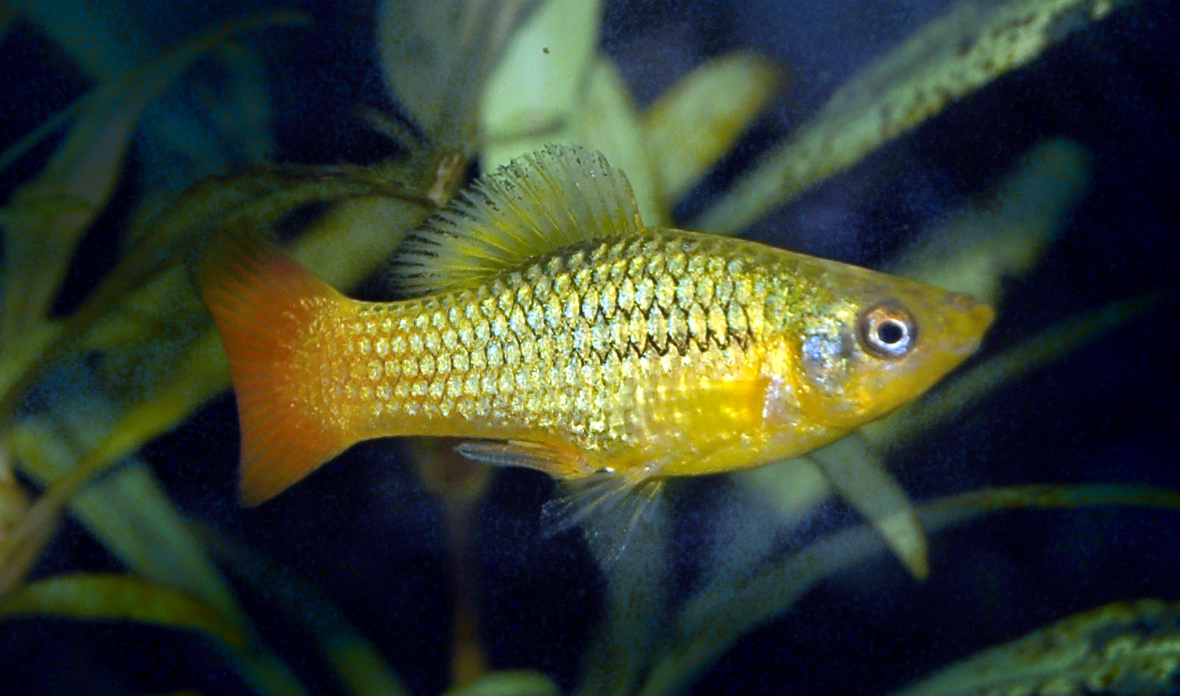
Variatus platy male

The variable platyfish (Xiphophorus variatus) grows to a maximum overall length of 7.0 cm (2.8 in). In the wild they are olive in color with black marbling or spots on the side of the caudal peduncle. Large males show blackish blotches on the dorsal fin. Unlike some other members of the genus, X. variatus has no claw at the tip ray. The fourth pectoral ray shows well-developed serrae (i.e. saw-like notches). They typically have 20 to 24 lateral scales, 10 to 12 dorsal rays and two rows of jaw teeth.

== Aquarium ==
Platys are widely used in tropical aquariums. Several different color variations have been developed, such as red, yellow, orange, blue, rainbow (combination of colors) and white.

Platys will usually live for around 3 years if their aquarium water parameters are satisfactory. The platys' ideal water parameters are:

- Water hardness – between 10 and 28 dGH
- Temperature – 72 to 82 °F (22 to 28 °C)
- Water pH – in range from 6.8 to 8.0

== See also ==
- Plati (disambiguation)
- Platy (disambiguation)
