= Chiapas swordtail =

Conservation status
- Least Concern (IUCN 3.1)

Scientific classification
- Kingdom: Animalia
- Phylum: Chordata
- Class: Actinopterygii
- Order: Cyprinodontiformes
- Family: Poeciliidae
- Genus: Xiphophorus
- Species: X. alvarezi

Binomial name
- Xiphophorus alvarezi D. E. Rosen, 1960

Species of fish

The Chiapas swordtail or upland swordtail (Xiphophorus alvarezi) is a species of livebearing freshwater fish of family Poeciliidae, and genus Xiphophorus. It is, therefore, in the same genus as the common platy and the swordtail. The Chiapas swordtail was discovered and first described by Donn E. Rosen in 1960, along with four other species of Xiphophorus.

== Description ==
Male Chipas swordtails attain up to 15 centimetres (5.9 in) in length. They have an overall body colour of orange market with pearlescent white spots and with green. The lower part of the caudal fin extends into a long "sword" which is bright green edged with black. The females are drabber, however, they may also have some orange markings on their sides. Females are smaller than males and reach a maximum length of 8.9 centimetres (3.5 in).

== Distribution ==
The Chiapas swordtail is restricted to eastern Chiapas in Mexico and adjacent parts of Guatemala.

== Habitat and biology ==
The Chiapas swordtail is found in rivers with fast flows. Their preferred habitat is shallow, clear pools which have a moderate current where there are rocks covered with algae. They graze algae off the rocks. They are ovoviviparous and females can give birth to 20-80 young after a gestation period of 24-30 days.

== Species description and etymology ==
The Chiaps swordtail was described as Xiphophorus helleri alvarezi by Donn E. Rosen in 1960 with the type locality given as Río Santo Domingo, a tributary of the Río Jatate of the Río Usumacinta system in Chiapas. This fish's specific name honours the Mexican ichthyologist José Álvarez del Villar (1903-1986) who showed this species to Rosen.

== Aquarium ==
Ideal, suitable conditions for Chiapas swordtails include a water temperature of around 25–28 °C. These are benthopelagic fish. Water pH should range from 7.2 to 8.1. They are quite resilient fish. They are often found in fast-flowing rivers. In nature, schools of more females than males are common, and enjoy dense aquatic foliage to give birth in. They reproduce quickly and prefer live foods and aquatic plants.
