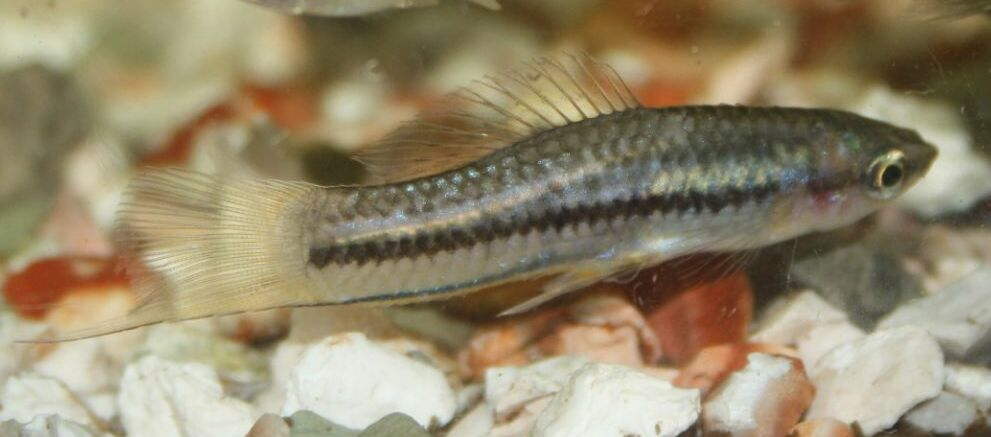
- Male
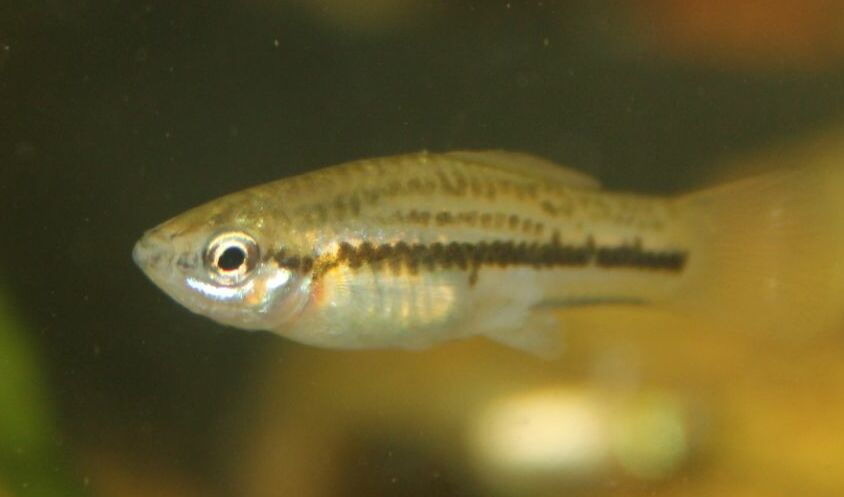
- Female

Conservation status
- Data Deficient (IUCN 3.1)

Scientific classification
- Kingdom: Animalia
- Phylum: Chordata
- Class: Actinopterygii
- Order: Cyprinodontiformes
- Family: Poeciliidae
- Genus: Xiphophorus
- Species: X. nigrensis

Binomial name
- Xiphophorus nigrensis D. E. Rosen, 1960

= Xiphophorus nigrensis =

Species of fish

Xiphophorus nigrensis, the Panuco swordtail, is a species of fish in the family Poeciliidae that is endemic to a small part of the Pánuco River basin in Mexico.

== Taxonomy ==
Being a small swordtail, Xiphophorus nigrensis was originally considered a subspecies of X. pygmaeus. Today it is recognized, along with X. multilineatus, as the closest related species to X. pygmaeus. The three species form a clade within the larger clade of northern swordtails. The similarity of the large males of X. nigrensis to the small males of X. cortezi, another northern swordtail, points to a close evolutionary relationship between these two species.

== Description ==
The body of Xiphophorus nigrensis is larger and deeper than that of X. pygmaeus. The males possess on their caudal fin a moderately to well-developed sword set off by a black line, from which the specific epithet nigrensis (niger meaning black and ensis sword in Latin) is derived. Pregnant females exhibit a dusky gravid spot on their bellies. Larger individuals are deeper-bodied and develop brilliant iridescent blue on their sides and flanks, which may somewhat conceal their midlateral black stripe.

Populations regularly contain both large (up to 40 mm) and small adult males (down to 18 mm). Large males possess swords, while small males do not. Small males are slender and of solid gold color.

== Distribution and habitat ==
Xiphophorus nigrensis is found in Rio Choy. The species inhabits clear, deep, fast-flowing waters along undercut slopes of river and stream beds. The depth can be as great as 3 m (9.8 ft).

== Reproduction ==
Xiphophorus nigrensis readily hybridizes with X. pygmaeus; in fact, females of the latter species prefer X. nigrensis males to those of their own species because large X. nigrensis males court females while X. pygmaeus males merely sneak up and chase them instead. Small X. nigrensis males also exhibit sneak-chase behavior.
