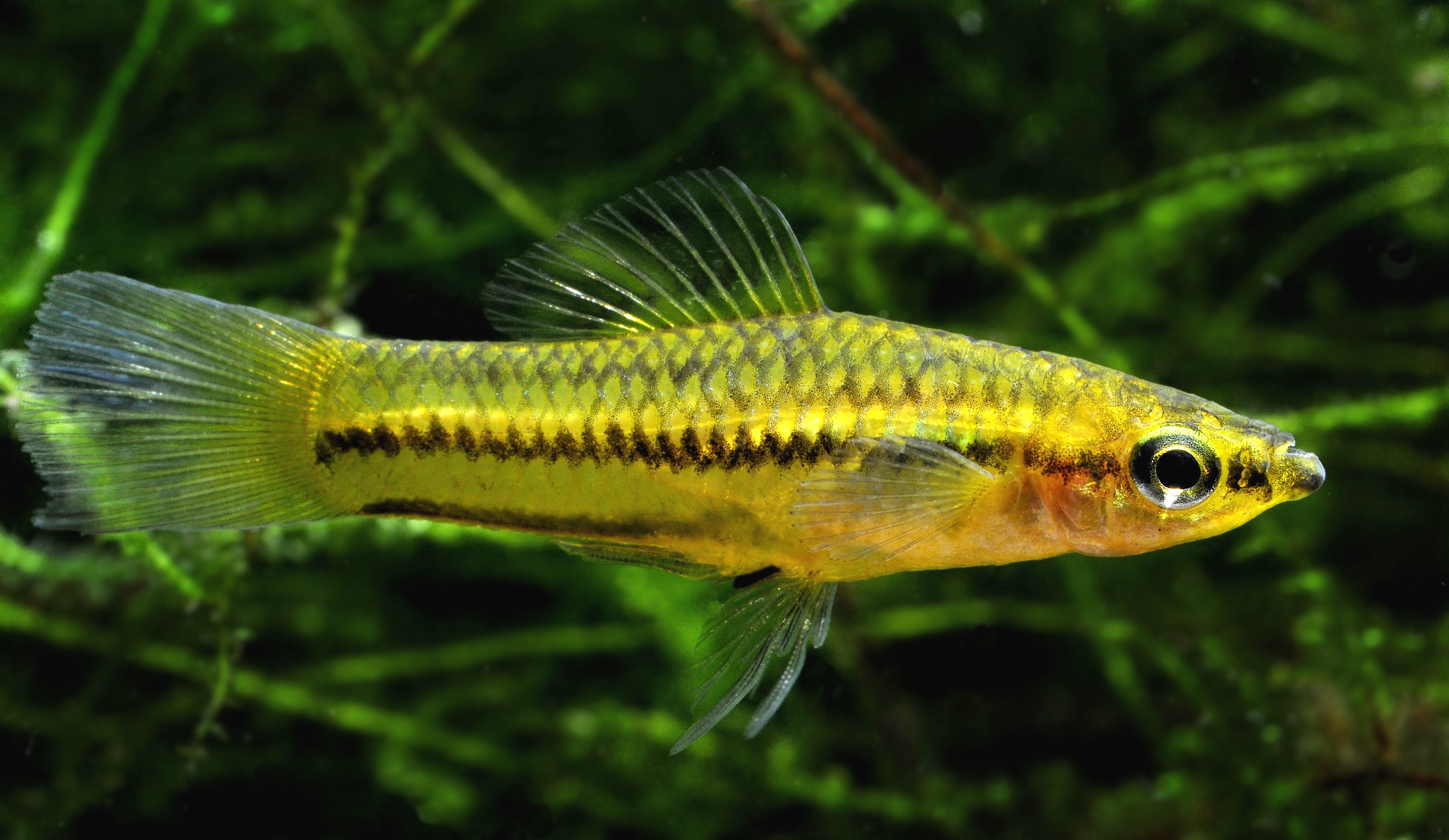
- Yellow morph male pygmy swordtail

Conservation status
- Data Deficient (IUCN 3.1)

Scientific classification
- Kingdom: Animalia
- Phylum: Chordata
- Class: Actinopterygii
- Order: Cyprinodontiformes
- Family: Poeciliidae
- Genus: Xiphophorus
- Species: X. pygmaeus

Binomial name
- Xiphophorus pygmaeus (Hubbs & Gordon, 1943)

= Xiphophorus pygmaeus =

Pygmy swordtail

Species of fish

Xiphophorus pygmaeus, the pygmy swordtail, is a poeciliid fish from northeastern Mexico. It is the smallest of the swordtails. The male's sword is barely visible and the species is often called the swordless swordtail. It is sometimes kept in home aquaria, but is a rather delicate species.

== Taxonomy and evolution ==
Xiphophorus pygmaeus is the smallest member of the genus Xiphophorus. It is most closely related to X. multilineatus and X. nigrensis, and males in particular look similar to the small males of the latter two species. The three species form a clade within the larger clade of northern swordtails. X. pygmaeus lost large-sized males and male traits associated with larger size: courtship behavior, body depth, and well-developed swords. Large size eventually reappeared in X. pygmaeus but the normally accompanying traits did not.

== Description ==
Females grow to 4.5 cm (1.8 in), while males attain 3.5 cm (1.4 in). The male's sword is only 1-2 mm long. The species was originally thought to consist only of small-sized males (all less than 29 mm long and most less than 24 mm), but in 1994 it was discovered that two populations contain large males.

The base color of the fish is gray-brown. Both small and large males can be yellow, but this color morph is very rare in nature because such flashy individuals are easy prey. No yellow females exist, and the trait appears to be sex-linked: male descendants of yellow males tend to be yellow too. Males are generally more intensely colored than females.

== Distribution and habitat ==
Xiphophorus pygmaeus was discovered in Rio Axtla, a tributary of Río Pánuco, by Myron Gordon in 1939. At the type locality, the fish were found in swift water among a dense stand of a Vallisneria-like plant along a steep bank. X. montezumae and X. variatus are found in the same section of the river, but their preference for shallower and slower water isolated X. pygmaeus from them.

Xiphophorus pygmaeus also inhabits Rio Axtla's tributaries Rio Tancuilin and Rio Huichihuayan. Its preferred habitat is characterized by soft bottoms and large stands of submerged plants such as Sagittaria.

== Reproduction ==
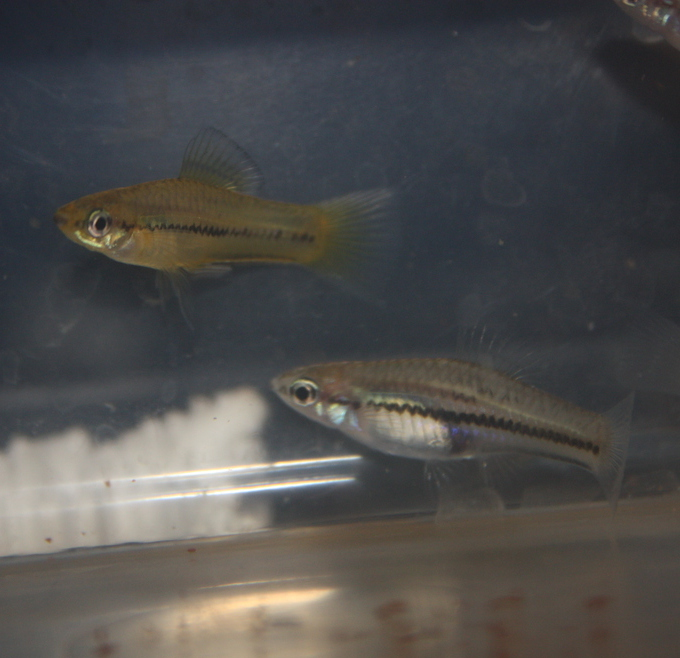
Male (up) and female (below)

Xiphophorus pygmaeus is unusual among swordtails in that females are not courted by males, neither small nor large. Instead, the males sneak up on females and chase them to enforce copulation. In most Xiphophorus species, including the most closely related, X. nigrensis and X. multilineatus, large males court females, while small males rely on the "sneak-chase" strategy. X. pygmaeus females prefer to be courted, however, and thus choose males of X. nigrensis over males of their own species when they can.

Xiphophorus pygmaeus breeds sparsely, with a female rarely giving birth to more than 10 fry at once. The fry are 6–7 mm (0.24–0.28 in) long at birth and usually not preyed upon by the adults.

== In aquarium ==
Caring for X. pygmaeus in the home aquarium is challenging. The species requires excellent filtration and frequent water changes and does not do well in soft water or temperatures exceeding 24°C. The addition of fine-leaved aquatic plants such as Ceratophyllum demersum is recommended because the fish feed on such plants and algae as well as infusoria growing among them.
