= Xiphophorus malinche =

Conservation status
- Data Deficient (IUCN 3.1)

Scientific classification
- Kingdom: Animalia
- Phylum: Chordata
- Class: Actinopterygii
- Order: Cyprinodontiformes
- Family: Poeciliidae
- Genus: Xiphophorus
- Species: X. malinche

Binomial name
- Xiphophorus malinche Rauchengerger, Kallman & Morizot, 1990

Species of fish

Xiphophorus malinche, also known as highland swordtail, is a live bearing fish in the family Poeciliidae. It is endemic to the Pánuco River basin in east-central Mexico. This species is named after La Malinche, an Indian slave who played a role in the Spanish conquest as the interpreter, secretary, and mistress of Hernán Cortés.

== Description ==
X. malinche reaches up to 5.5 cm (2.2 in) in total length. It is a species closely related to X. cortezi and X. birchmanni, with one zigzag horizontal stripe, a well-developed reticulum and males with a prominent bump on their head. It has branched caudal fin rays, a distinctive vertical bar pattern and middorsal spotting. Its sword has a dark ventral pigment and is distinctly upturned. It also possesses a well-formed hook on its gonopodium. Its grave spot is well developed; it has yellow carotenoid pigments.

It has melanophore spotting at the nodes of the reticulum. In X. malinche, females have oval pigmentation blotches. Vertical bar patterns of X. malinche males, however, are very irregular. Many of the bars are of uneven thickness and sometimes slanted. This irregularity varies from fish to fish, and from right to left sides of the same fish.

== Behaviour ==
This species exhibits atypical behavior for swordtails of the montezumae or cortezi groups. In other species of these groups, mature males are usually found darting among and underneath rocks. Males (and females) of X. malinche were found in a shallow, sunny, sand-bottomed river under floating aquatic vegetation. It is known to hybridise with X. birchmanni.

== Distribution ==
This species is restricted to several tributaries of the Pánuco River basin in Mexico: Rio Claro, Rio Moctezuma drainage, Rio Calnali, Rio Conzintla, Rio Atlapexco drainage, Arroyo Soyatla and Rio Calabozo drainage.
