= Xiphophorus kosszanderi =

Scientific classification
- Domain: Eukaryota
- Kingdom: Animalia
- Phylum: Chordata
- Class: Actinopterygii
- Order: Cyprinodontiformes
- Family: Poeciliidae
- Genus: Xiphophorus
- Species: X. kosszanderi

Binomial name
- Xiphophorus kosszanderi M. K. Meyer & Wischnath, 1981

Species of fish

Xiphophorus kosszanderi, the speckled platy, is a fish in the family Poeciliidae. It is found in Mexico. Although Fishbase lists this species as valid other authorities regard this taxon as a hybrid between Xiphophorus variatus and X. xiphidium.
