= Northern platyfish =

Conservation status
- Endangered (IUCN 3.1)

Scientific classification
- Kingdom: Animalia
- Phylum: Chordata
- Class: Actinopterygii
- Order: Cyprinodontiformes
- Family: Poeciliidae
- Genus: Xiphophorus
- Species: X. gordoni

Binomial name
- Xiphophorus gordoni R. R. Miller & W. L. Minckley, 1963

Species of fish

The northern platyfish (Xiphophorus gordoni) is a small, endangered species of fish in the family Poeciliidae. It is endemic to the vicinity of Cuatro Ciénegas in the Mexican state of Coahuila. It is restricted to hot-spring heated ditches and marshes of the Laguna Santa Tecla. Its native water is shallow and vegetation-choked, with very stable temperatures that generally are around 27–30 °C (81–86 °F), although captive studies show the species also can live in slightly colder water.

The species is primarily threatened by habitat loss due to construction of irrigation channels. Captive "safety" populations are kept at the Xiphophorus Genetic Stock Center, Texas State University, United States, and by XNP conservation project members, which include public aquariums, universities and private aquarists in several European countries and the United States.

It was named in honor of Myron Gordon by Robert Rush Miller and W. L. Minckley who discovered it with Carl Hubbs on a 1961 expedition. The northern platyfish shares the title as northernmost naturally distributed Xiphophorus with the closely related Monterrey platyfish (X. couchianus) and marbled swordtail (X. meyeri).
