= Platy =

Platy may refer to:

- Platy (fish), two related species of fish, both referred to as platies:
  - Southern platyfish
  - Variable platyfish
- Platy, Florina, a village in the Florina regional unit, Greece
- Platy, Imathia, a town in Imathia, Greece
- Platy, Lemnos, a village on the island of Lemnos, Greece
- Platy, a class of structure of peds (soil particles)
- The platypus, a species of Australian Egg-laying-mammal

== See also ==
- Platys
