= Marbled swordtail =

Conservation status
- Extinct in the Wild (IUCN 3.1)

Scientific classification
- Kingdom: Animalia
- Phylum: Chordata
- Class: Actinopterygii
- Order: Cyprinodontiformes
- Family: Poeciliidae
- Genus: Xiphophorus
- Species: X. meyeri

Binomial name
- Xiphophorus meyeri Schartl & Schröder, 1987

Synonyms
- Xiphophorus marmoratus Obregón-Barboza & Contreras-Balderas, 1988

Species of fish

The marbled swordtail (Xiphophorus meyeri) is a species of freshwater fish in the family Poeciliidae. It was endemic to the Rio Salado system (itself a part of the Rio Grande basin) in Coahuila, northeastern Mexico. It was restricted to springs, connected creeks and pools in waters with a pH slightly above neutral and temperatures of 16–26 °C (61–79 °F), with captive studies indicating that the optimum temperature is around 24 °C (75 °F).

The marbled swordtail is considered extinct in the wild by the IUCN with the last wild record in 1997, meaning that it survives only in captivity. Captive populations are maintained at the Xiphophorus Genetic Stock Center, Texas State University, United States, and by XNP conservation project members, which include public aquariums, universities and private aquarists in several European countries and the United States. The marbled swordtail shares the title as northernmost naturally distributed Xiphophorus with the closely related Monterrey platyfish (X. couchianus) and northern platyfish (X. gordoni). The specific name of this species honours the German ichthyologist Manfred K. Meyer.
