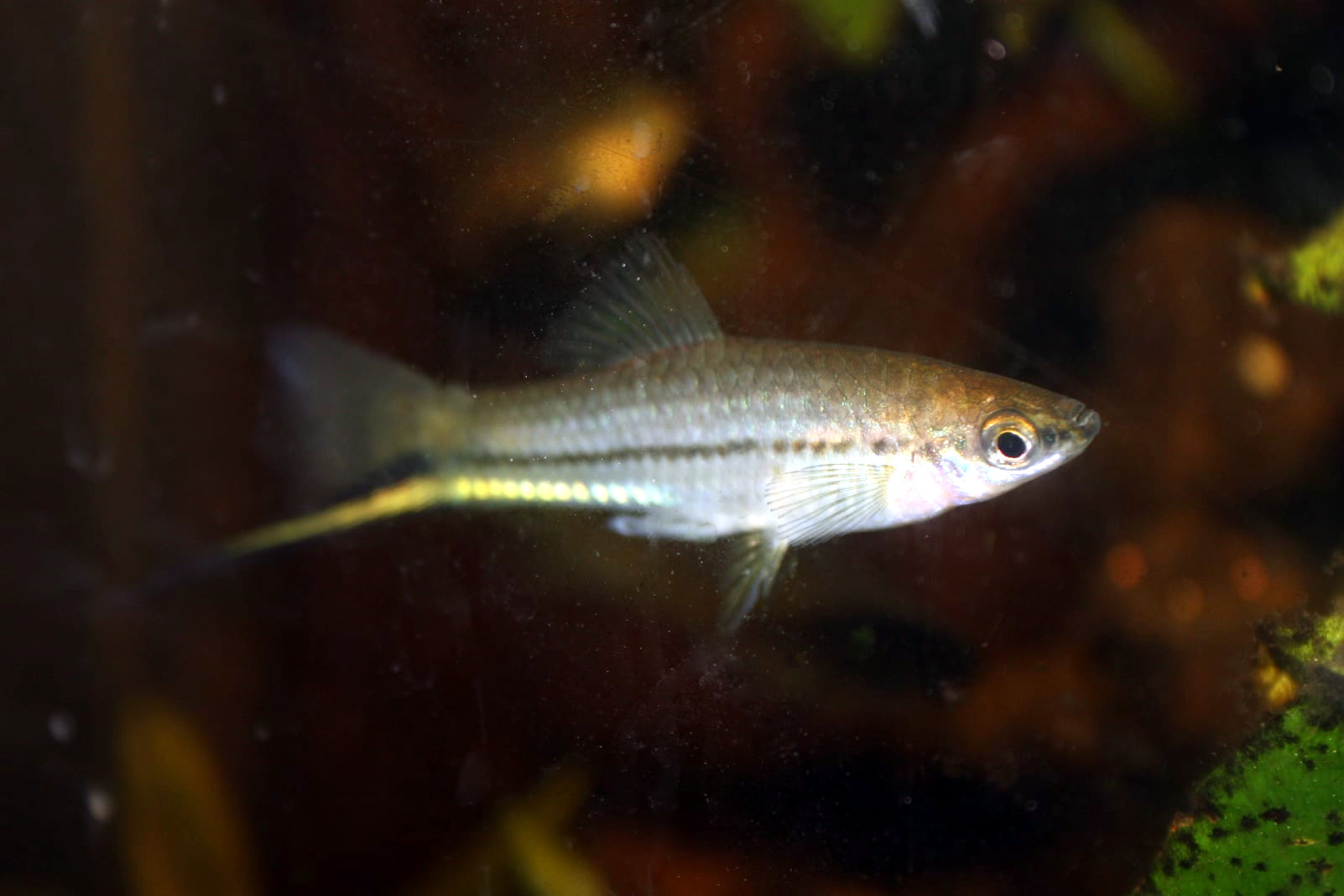
- A male
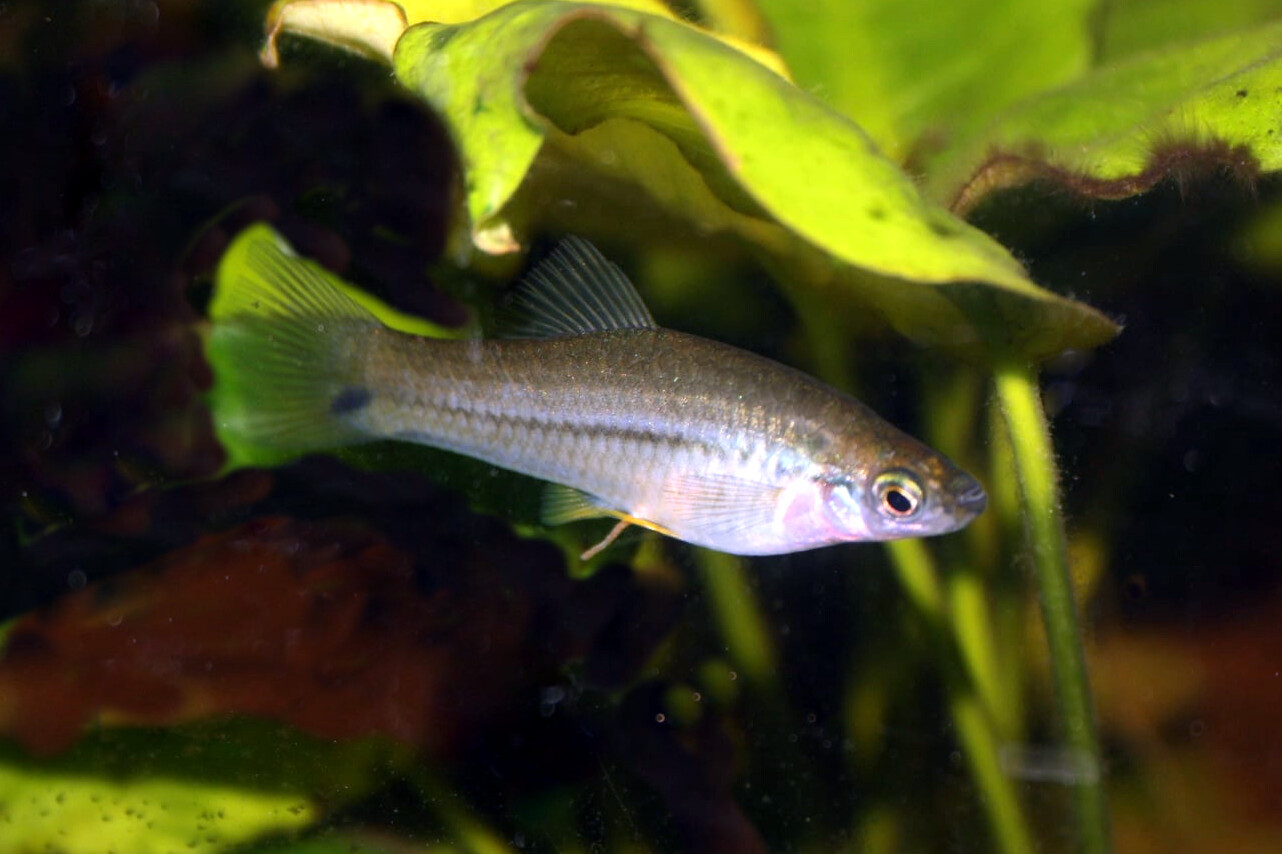
- A female

Conservation status
- Vulnerable (IUCN 3.1)

Scientific classification
- Kingdom: Animalia
- Phylum: Chordata
- Class: Actinopterygii
- Order: Cyprinodontiformes
- Family: Poeciliidae
- Genus: Xiphophorus
- Species: X. signum

Binomial name
- Xiphophorus signum Rosen & Kallman, 1969

Synonyms
- Xiphophorus helleri signum Rosen & Kallman, 1969

= Xiphophorus signum =

Species of fish

Xiphophorus signum is a poeciliid fish endemic to Guatemala. It occurs in only one creek and adjacent pools, making it a vulnerable species.

X. signum was originally described as a deep-bodied subspecies of X. helleri by Rosen and Kallman in 1969. It was elevated by Rosen to the species level ten years later. Its scientific name, signum, refers to the distinctive black mark on the caudal fin. Rosen and Kallman speculated that X. signum may be a sister species of X. guentheri because it is found in an isolated area in the middle of the natural range of X. guentheri, unless the latter species' range had expanded after X. signum appeared in its own.

A distinctive trait of X. signum is the elongate black spot at the base of the caudal fin, which appears in both sexes when they reach the length of 1 cm and becomes obscured in adult males as their "sword" grows. The body is predominantly greenish and features only one horizontal stripe on each of the sides. The caudal and dorsal fins of adults may have an orange-yellow tint. The largest reported specimen measured 7.5 cm in total length.

X. signum is known exclusively from the drainage basin of Rio Chajmaic, a tributary of the Pasión River. There it inhabits pools and a small creek of fast, clear water shaded by a dense forest cover. It shares its habitat with even an smaller poeciliid, Scolichthys iota, and a Bramocharax species. The IUCN classifies X. signum as a vulnerable species due to its extremely limited range. Small-scale agriculture exists throughout this range, but the major threat is the development of palm oil plantations.

X. signum is a livebearer. The female gives birth to 20–40 fry every 4–5 weeks. It is the only species of Xiphophorus that has proved difficult, and potentially impossible, to hybridize with other Xiphophorus species in the laboratory.
