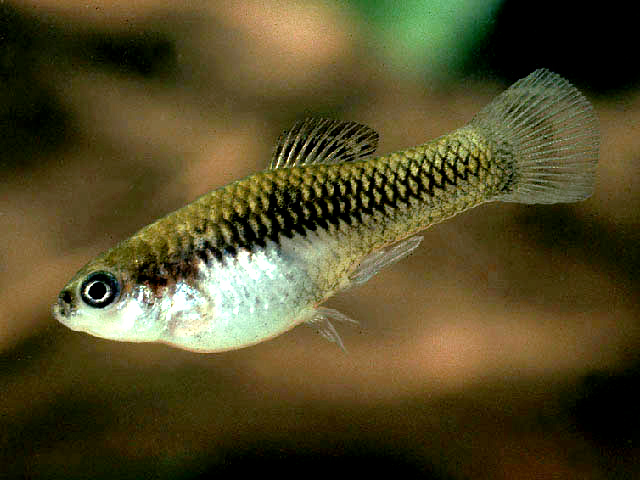
- Xiphophorus couchianus

Conservation status
- Extinct in the Wild (IUCN 3.1)

Scientific classification
- Kingdom: Animalia
- Phylum: Chordata
- Class: Actinopterygii
- Order: Cyprinodontiformes
- Family: Poeciliidae
- Genus: Xiphophorus
- Species: X. couchianus

Binomial name
- Xiphophorus couchianus (Girard, 1859)

Synonyms
- Limia couchiana Girard, 1859; Platypoecilus couchianus (Girard, 1859); Poecilia couchii Günther, 1866

= Monterrey platyfish =

Species of fish

The Monterrey platyfish (Xiphophorus couchianus) is a species of freshwater fish in family Poecilidae. A live-bearer, it was native to a very small section of the San Juan River system (itself part of the Rio Grande basin) in the vicinity of the city of Monterrey, Mexico.

== Etymology ==
The specific name refers to the American soldier and naturalist Darius N. Couch (1822–1897) who collected the type on a self-financed expedition to Mexico.

== Appearance ==
The Monterrey platyfish is a dull-colored fish, appearing not unlike a female guppy. Another form, sometimes referred to as X. aff. couchianus, was discovered in Apodaca, central Monterrey, in 1983. It has large black blotching, unlike the typical, unspotted form from the Huasteca Canyon. Whether the Apodaca form represents a separate species is presently unclear.

Sexual dimorphism is moderate, the male Monterrey platyfish growing to a maximum overall length of 4 cm (1.6 in) and the female 6 cm (2.4 in).

== Conservation ==
IUCN lists the Monterrey platyfish as "extinct in the wild". Although once found more widely in the region of Monterrey, populations have been lost to urban sprawl, with water habitats either drying up (due to land reclamation and water extraction) or being heavily polluted. Introduced species is another threat. "Safety populations" are maintained in captivity by the Centro de Resguardo para Peces en Peligro de Extinción at Universidad Autónoma de Nuevo León, Mexico (maintaining both the typical form and X. aff. couchianus), Xiphophorus Genetic Stock Center at Texas State University, United States (maintaining typical form), via the American Livebearer Association that mostly includes private aquarists in the United States (maintaining typical form), and by XNP conservation project members, which include public aquariums, universities and private aquarists in several European countries and the United States (maintaining typical form). The species has proven harder to maintain in captivity than most Xiphophorus species.

The Monterrey platyfish shares the title as northernmost naturally distributed Xiphophorus with the closely related northern platyfish (X. gordoni) and marbled swordtail (X. meyeri), which are two species that also are restricted to northeastern Mexico and seriously threatened.
