= Platys =

Platys may refer to:

== Species ==
- Anaplasma platys, bacterium
- Cacosternum platys, species of frog
- The duck-billed-platypus, species of mammal

== Other uses ==
- Staurakios Platys, Byzantine officer
- Platys Gialos (disambiguation)

== See also ==
- Platy
