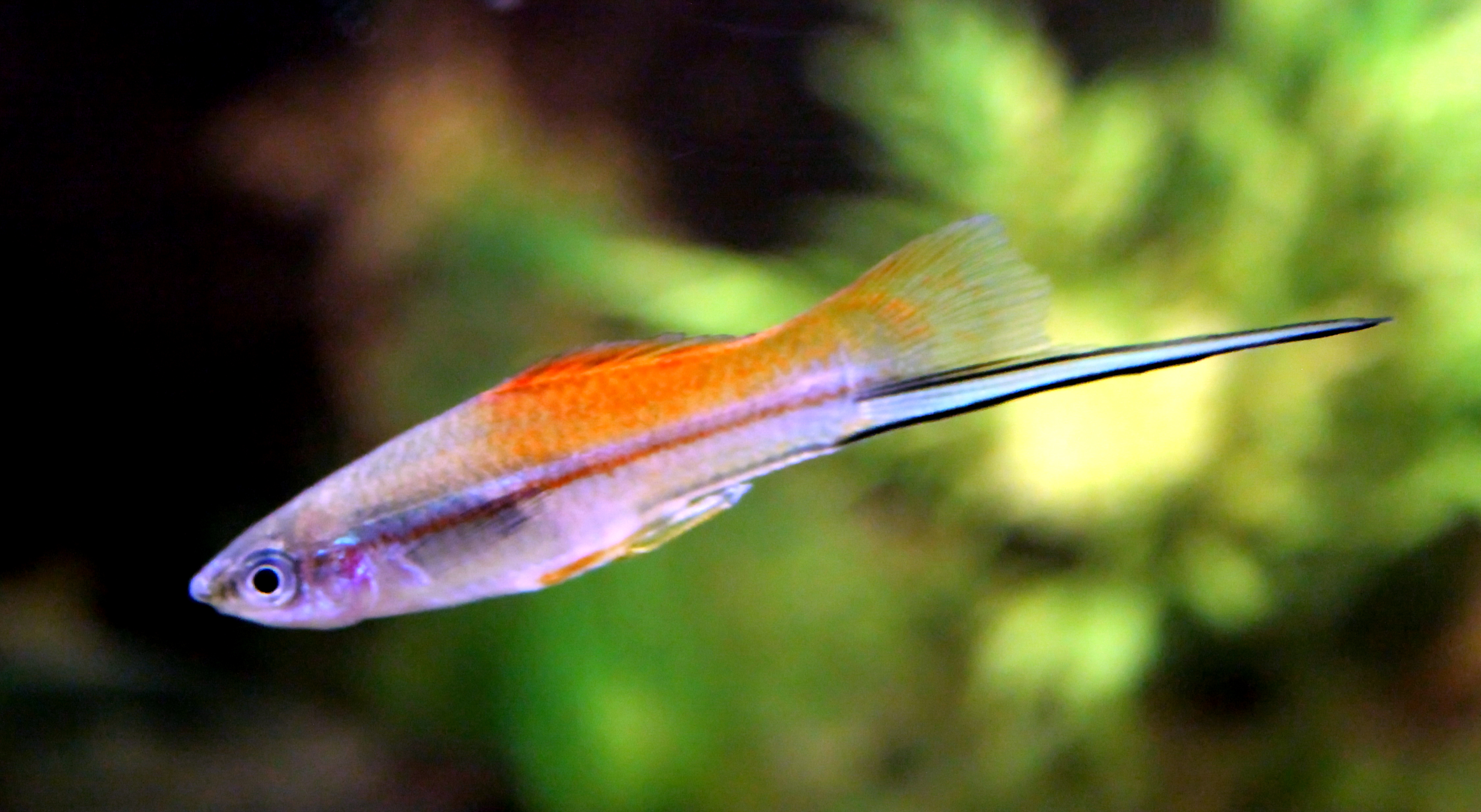
- Green swordtail, Xiphophorus hellerii

Scientific classification
- Kingdom: Animalia
- Phylum: Chordata
- Class: Actinopterygii
- Division: Teleostei
- Order: Cyprinodontiformes
- Family: Poeciliidae
- Tribe: Poeciliini
- Genus: Xiphophorus; Heckel, 1848

Type species
- Xiphophorus hellerii Heckel, 1848

Species
- See text

Synonyms
- Platypoecilus Günther, 1866

= Xiphophorus =

Genus of fishes

Xiphophorus is a genus of euryhaline and freshwater fishes in the family Poeciliidae of order Cyprinodontiformes, native to Mexico and northern Central America. Xiphophorus species can be divided into three groups based on their evolutionary relationships: platyfish (or platies), northern swordtails, and southern swordtails. Platyfish formerly were classified in another genus, Platypoecilus, which is now obsolete. The type species is X. hellerii, the green swordtail. Like most other new world Poeciliids, platies and swordtails are live-bearers that use internal fertilization and give birth to live young instead of laying eggs like the bulk of the world's fishes. All are relatively small fishes, which reach a maximum length of 3.5–16 cm (1.4–6.3 in) depending on the exact species involved.

== Distribution and conservation status ==
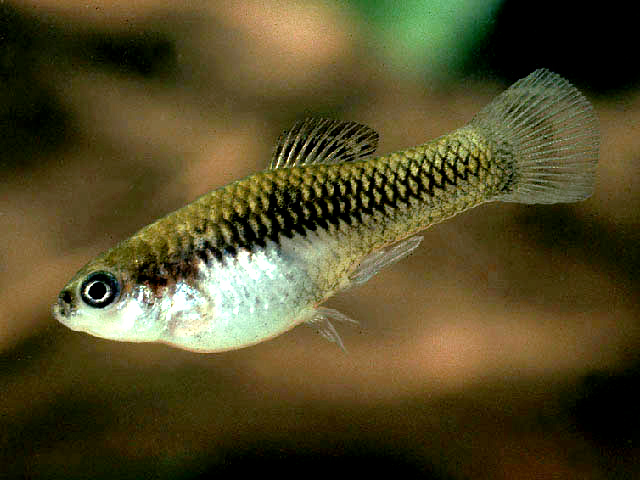
The Monterrey platyfish is one of three Xiphophorus species that is restricted to the southern Rio Grande basin and threatened

The various Xiphophorus species range from the southern Rio Grande basin in Mexico, through eastern drainages in the country (river basins draining into the Gulf of Mexico), to northern Guatemala, Belize and northern Honduras.

Three species and their hybrids are common in the aquarium trade: the green swordtail (X. hellerii), the southern platyfish (X. maculatus) and the variable platyfish (X. variatus). These three are the only species that have large native ranges. They have also been introduced outside their native range (in Mexico, Central America, and other continents) where they sometimes become invasive and outcompete and endanger native species, including other more localized members of Xiphophorus.

All other species of Xiphophorus are highly localized and mostly endemic to Mexico. Only three of the localized species, the Chiapas swordtail (X. alvarezi), X. mayae and X. signum, range outside Mexico and the last two are the only Xiphophorus species not found in Mexico at all. In many locations there are two or more sympatric species, but the localized species are mostly (though not entirely) separated from each other, even when they are restricted to the same river basin. This includes three restricted species in the Rio Grande basin (all fully separated), nine restricted species in the Pánuco River basin (mostly separated) and three restricted species in the Coatzacoalcos River basin (mostly separated).

The International Union for Conservation of Nature (IUCN) lists the spiketail platyfish (X. andersi) and northern platyfish (X. gordoni) as Endangered, while the Monterrey platyfish (X. couchianus) and marbled swordtail (X. meyeri) are listed as Extinct in the wild, and thus only survive in captivity. In addition to those, Mexican authorities recognize the yellow swordtail (X. clemenciae) and Catemaco platyfish (Xiphophorus milleri) as threatened. Almost all the Xiphophorus, including the rare species, have captive populations that are maintained as "insurance" populations at breeding centers and by dedicated private aquarists.

== Human uses ==
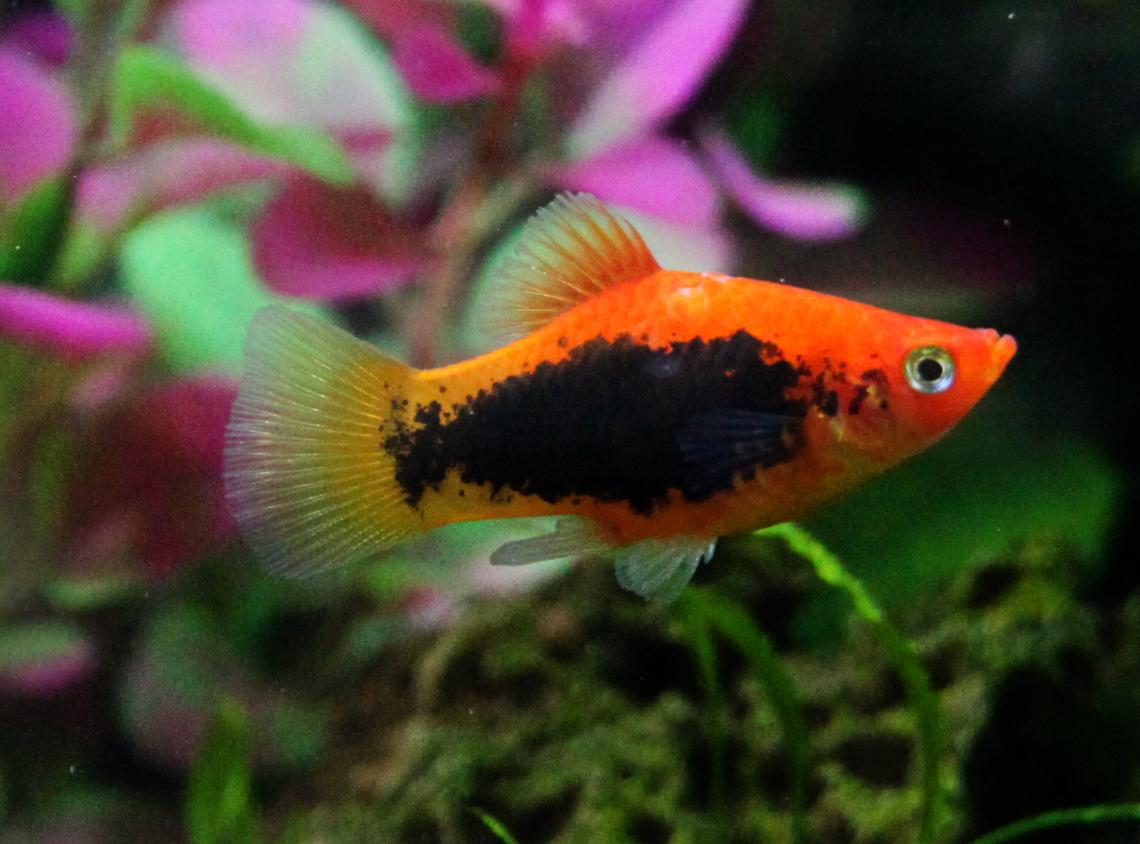
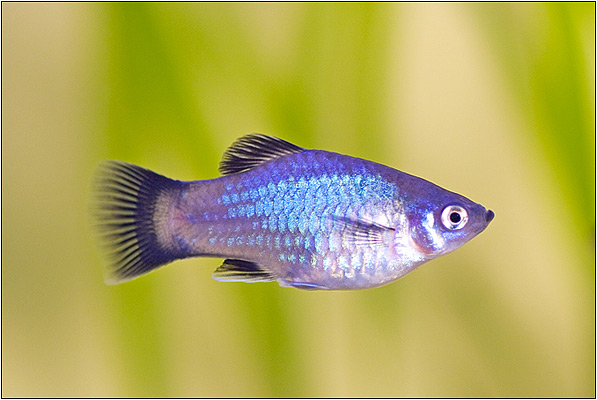
Two southern platyfish showing some of the extreme variations achieved through selective breeding in captivity

Xiphophorus species are regularly used in genetic studies, and scientists have developed many interspecific hybrids,. Xiphophorus have proved a useful model to understand the consequences of hybridization, especially in the context of melanoma research since the 1920s. The Xiphophorus Genetic stock center, founded by Myron Gordon in 1939, is an important source of these fish for research.

Several species are commonly kept by aquarium hobbyists, especially the green swordtail (X. helleri), southern platyfish (X. maculatus), and variable platyfish (X. variatus). These three species comprise one of the most prominent groups of aquarium species, being part of a group of extremely hardy livebearing fish, alongside the molly and guppy, that can adjust to a wide range of conditions within the aquarium. Unlike some species, xiphophorus are almost always offered as captive bred individuals due to the ease of breeding these livebearers.

In captivity, they will coexist with many other fish species, although in an aquarium with too many males and not enough females, fighting can ensue between males of the same species. They can also easily jump out of an inadequately covered aquarium.

== Species and taxonomy ==
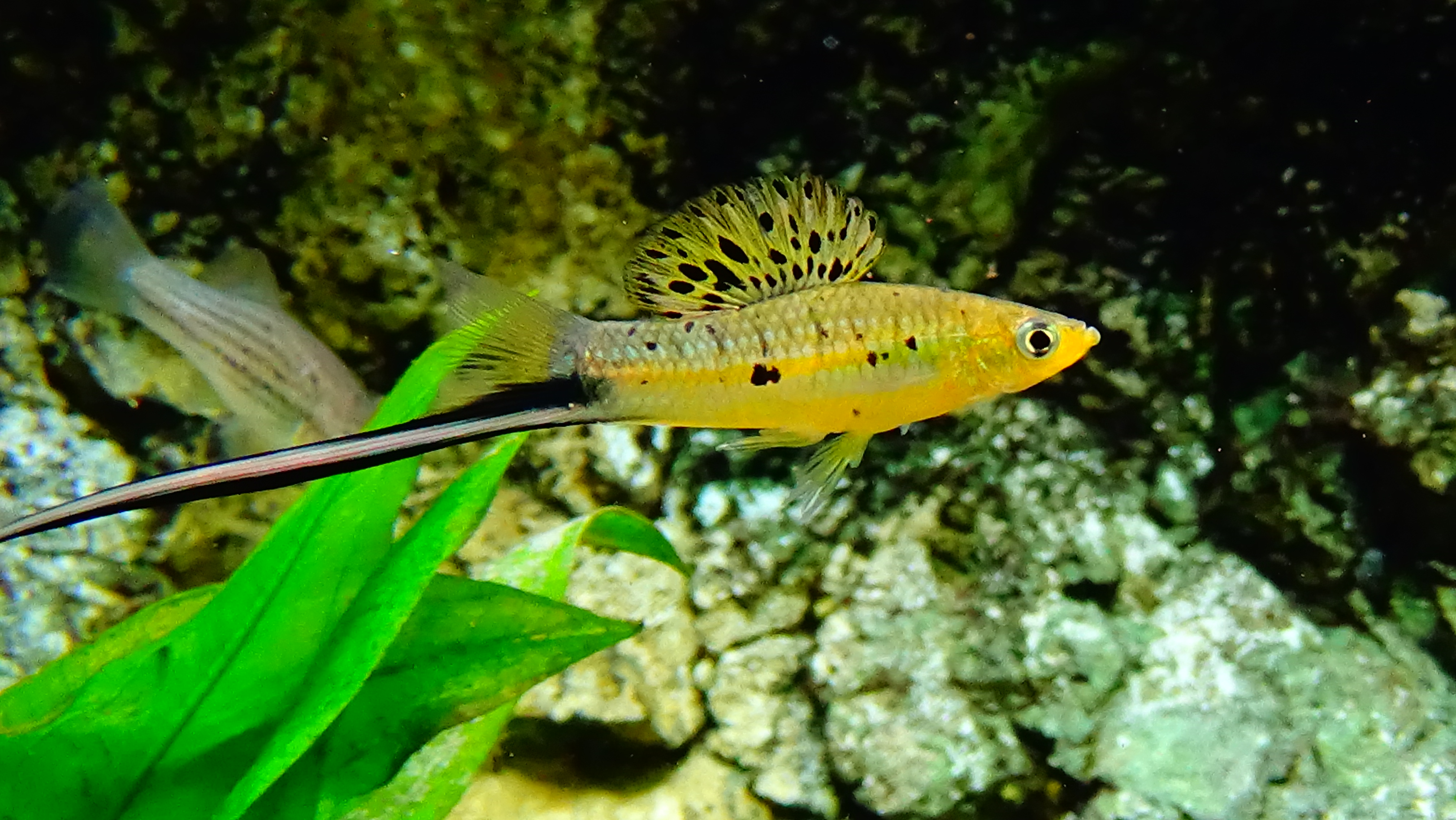
Males of the Montezuma swordtail have the proportionally longest tail "sword" among the swordtails, but as in all species the females lack it

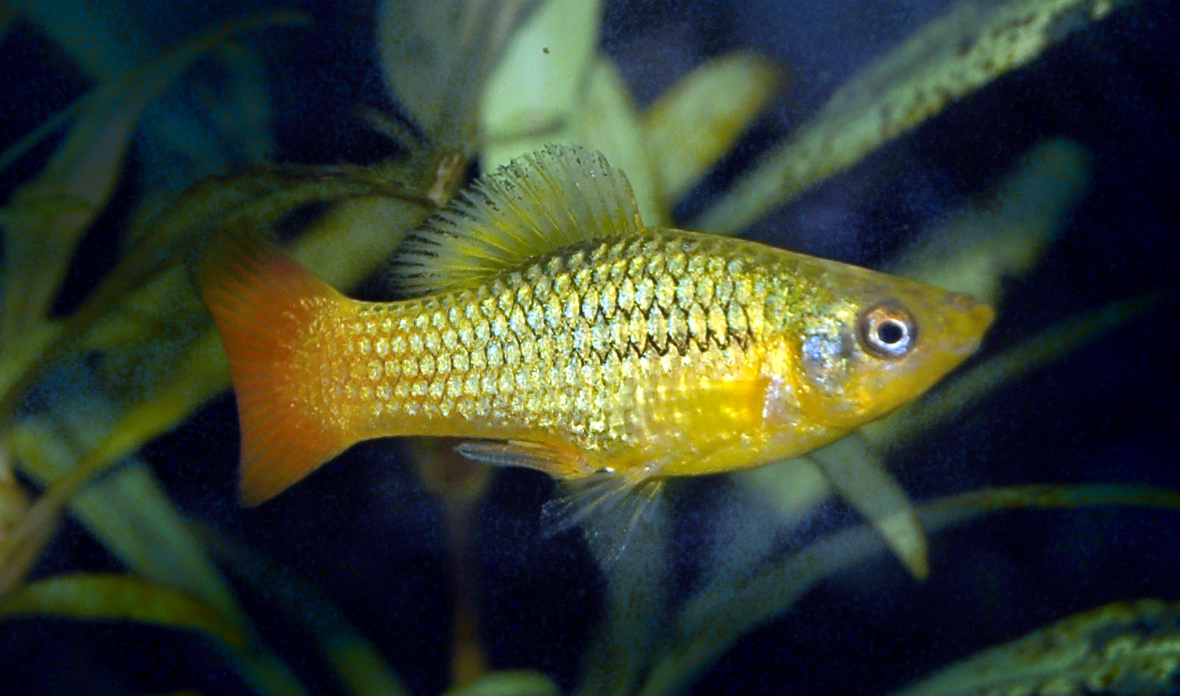
One of the typical captive forms of the variable platyfish

There are currently 28 recognized species in this genus, according to FishBase. Two of these species, X. clemenciae and X. monticolus, are likely the result of natural hybrid speciation (ancestors of both are a platy species and a swordtail species). Two other proposed species, X. kosszanderi and X. roseni, are recognized by FishBase, but not by all other authorities, as the first appears to be a hybrid between X. variatus and X. xiphidium, and the second between X. variatus and X. couchianus (X. kosszanderi and X. roseni have not undergone speciation as in X. clemenciae and X. monticolus). Contemporary hybridization in the wild was thought to be uncommon in this genus until recently.

Although traditionally divided into swordtails and platies, this separation is not supported by phylogenetic studies, which have shown that the swordtails are paraphyletic compared with the platies. These studies suggest that the genus can be divided into three monophyletic groups: the northern swordtails (of the Pánuco River basin, marked with a star* in the list), southern swordtails (southern Mexico to Honduras) and the platies. The common names given to individual species in this genus do not always reflect their actual relationships; for example, the marbled swordtail (X. meyeri) is actually in the platy group based on its genetics while the short-sword platyfish (X. continens) is closer to the swordtails.

Swordtails (Xiphophorus)

- Xiphophorus alvarezi D. E. Rosen, 1960 (Chiapas swordtail)
- Xiphophorus birchmanni* Lechner & Radda, 1987 (sheepshead swordtail)
- Xiphophorus clemenciae Álvarez, 1959 (yellow swordtail)
- Xiphophorus continens* Rauchengerger, Kallman & Morizot, 1990 (short-sword platyfish)
- Xiphophorus cortezi* D. E. Rosen, 1960 (delicate swordtail)
- Xiphophorus hellerii Heckel, 1848 (green swordtail)
- Xiphophorus kallmani M. K. Meyer & Schartl, 2003
- Xiphophorus malinche* Rauchengerger, Kallman & Morizot, 1990 (highland swordtail)
- Xiphophorus mayae M. K. Meyer & Schartl, 2002
- Xiphophorus mixei Kallman, Walter, Morizot & Kazianis, 2004 (Mixe swordtail)
- Xiphophorus montezumae* D. S. Jordan & Snyder, 1899 (Montezuma swordtail)
- Xiphophorus monticolus Kallman, Walter, Morizot & Kazianis, 2004 (southern mountain swordtail)
- Xiphophorus multilineatus* Rauchengerger, Kallman & Morizot, 1990
- Xiphophorus nezahualcoyotl* Rauchengerger, Kallman & Morizot, 1990 (mountain swordtail)
- Xiphophorus nigrensis* D. E. Rosen, 1960 (Panuco swordtail)
- Xiphophorus pygmaeus* C. L. Hubbs & Gordon, 1943 (pygmy swordtail)
- Xiphophorus signum D. E. Rosen & Kallman, 1969

Platies (Platypoecilus)

- Xiphophorus andersi M. K. Meyer & Schartl, 1980 (spiketail platyfish)
- Xiphophorus couchianus (Girard, 1859) (Monterrey platyfish)
- Xiphophorus evelynae D. E. Rosen, 1960 (Puebla platyfish)
- Xiphophorus gordoni R. R. Miller & W. L. Minckley, 1963 (northern platyfish)
- Xiphophorus kosszanderi M. K. Meyer & Wischnath, 1981 – often not recognized as a valid species, as likely a hybrid
- Xiphophorus maculatus (Günther, 1866) (southern platyfish)
- Xiphophorus meyeri Schartl & Schröder, 1988 (marbled swordtail)
- Xiphophorus milleri D. E. Rosen, 1960 (Catemaco platyfish)
- Xiphophorus roseni M. K. Meyer & Wischnath, 1981 – often not recognized as a valid species, as likely a hybrid
- Xiphophorus variatus (Meek, 1904) (variable platyfish)
- Xiphophorus xiphidium (Gordon, 1932) (swordtail platyfish)

== Research ==
Hybridization: Xiphophorus is a leading animal model systems in the study of hybridization between species. In particular, studies in Xiphophorus provided some early evidence that recombination controlled patterns of ancestry in hybrid genomes. An interesting consequence of hybridization is the origin of spontaneous melanoma in hybrids. For example, in the well-studied Gordon-Kosswig cross between X. maculatus and X. hellerii, hybrids develop spontaneous melanoma due to an interaction between the oncogene xmrk and a repressor locus on a distinct chromosome.

Pigmentation: Xiphophorus pigmentation has been investigated since the 1920s using classical genetics techniques such as crosses. As a result, inheritance patterns of many traits have been described. More recently, researchers have identified specific genes and even mutations causing pigment pattern variation (for instance, a spot allowing males to mimic females) and investigated selective mechanisms on these traits.

Sexual selection: Researchers since Darwin have studied Xiphophorus species for their sexually selected ornaments (e.g. caudal fin "swords"). More recent studies have focused on male ornamentation, courtship strategies, and female mate choice.

== Etymology ==
The genus name Xiphophorus derives from the Ancient Greek words ξίφος (xíphos), meaning 'sword', and φόρος (phóros), meaning 'bearing', referring to the gonopodium on the males.
