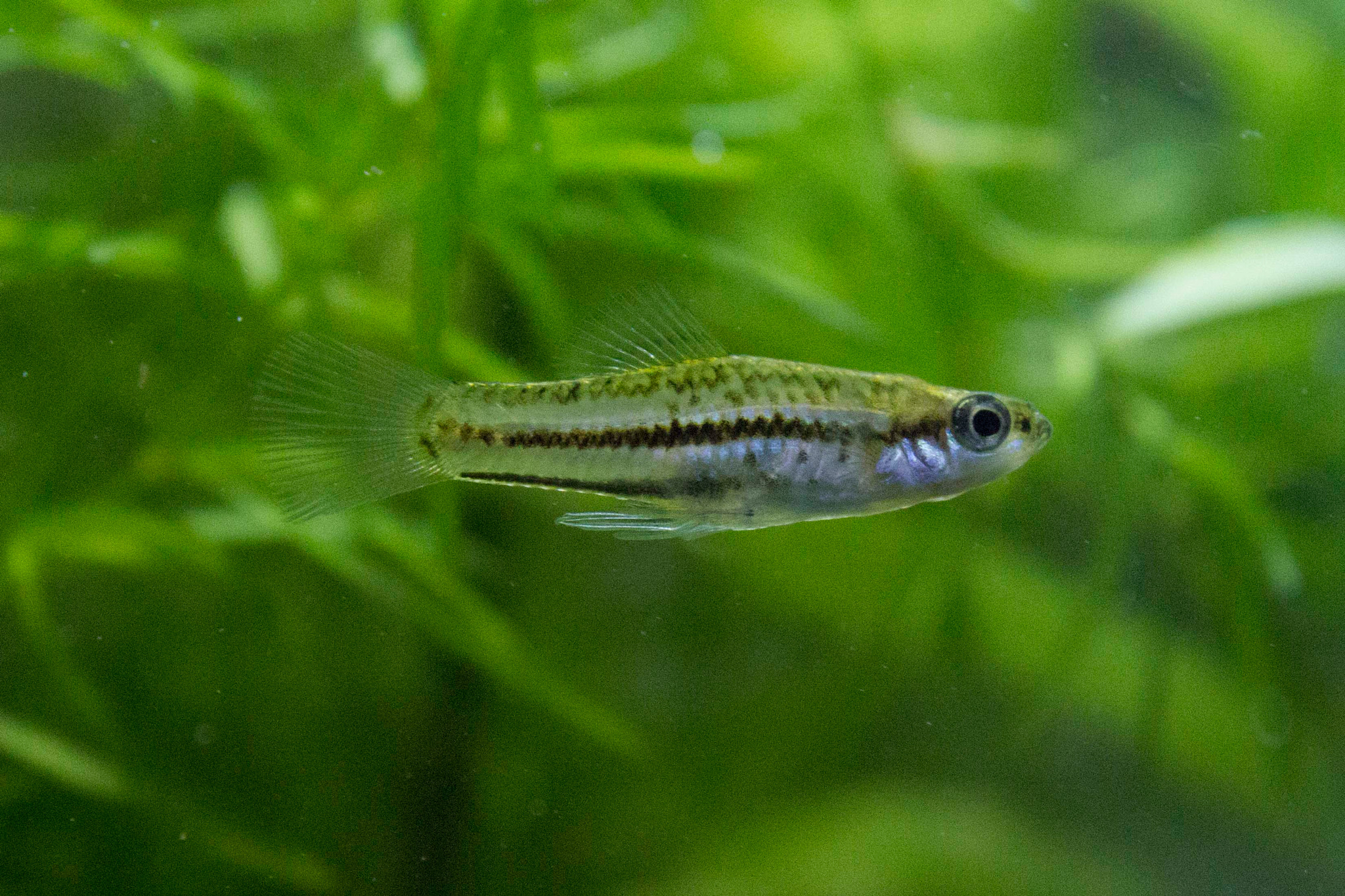

Conservation status
- Data Deficient (IUCN 3.1)

Scientific classification
- Kingdom: Animalia
- Phylum: Chordata
- Class: Actinopterygii
- Order: Cyprinodontiformes
- Family: Poeciliidae
- Genus: Xiphophorus
- Species: X. continens

Binomial name
- Xiphophorus continens Rauchengerger, Kallman & Morizot, 1990

= Xiphophorus continens =

Species of fish

Xiphophorus continens, also known as El Quince swordtail or short-sword platyfish, is a live-bearing freshwater fish in the family Poeciliidae. It is endemic to the Pánuco River basin in east-central Mexico. Its name comes from the Greek conto, meaning short, and Latin ensis, meaning "sword". due to the species' sword size in males.

== Description ==
X. continens reaches up to 3.5 cm (1.4 in) in total length. It is a small, slender species, with a slender caudal peduncle and with a midlateral stripe. The maximum length of the sword is 1 mm (0.04 in).

== Distribution ==
Headwaters of the Rio Ojo Frio, north of Damian Carmona, Pánuco River drainage, San Luis Potosí.
