= Plati =

Plati may refer to:

- Platì, a village in Calabria, Italy
- Platí, an uninhabited Dodecanese islet in the archipelago of Kalymnos, Greece
- Mark Plati, musician
- Plati, Evros, a village in Evros, Greece

== See also ==
- Giovanni Benedetto Platti (1697?-1763), Italian Baroque composer and oboist
- Platy (disambiguation)
