= Yellow swordtail =

Conservation status
- Data Deficient (IUCN 3.1)

Scientific classification
- Kingdom: Animalia
- Phylum: Chordata
- Class: Actinopterygii
- Order: Cyprinodontiformes
- Family: Poeciliidae
- Genus: Xiphophorus
- Species: X. clemenciae

Binomial name
- Xiphophorus clemenciae Álvarez, 1959

Species of fish

The yellow swordtail (Xiphophorus clemenciae) is a species of freshwater fish in the family Poeciliidae. It is endemic to the upper Coatzacoalcos River basin in southern Mexico. It is typically found in brooks and streams with slow current; it is less frequent in areas with strong current. The yellow swordtail is considered a threatened species by Mexican authorities. It reaches up to 5.1 cm (2.0 in) in standard length.

Unusually, the yellow swordtail appears to be the result of hybrid speciation, and its ancestors a platy species and a swordtail species. The southern mountain swordtail (X. monticolus), which is found further south in the Coatzacoalcos River basin than the yellow swordtail, is the result of a similar event.

The fish is named in honor of Álvarez' wife Clemencia, whose help and advice made it possible for him to devote himself to the pursuit of his scientific research.
