= Xiphophorus mayae =

Scientific classification
- Domain: Eukaryota
- Kingdom: Animalia
- Phylum: Chordata
- Class: Actinopterygii
- Order: Cyprinodontiformes
- Family: Poeciliidae
- Genus: Xiphophorus
- Species: X. mayae

Binomial name
- Xiphophorus mayae M. K. Meyer & Schartl, 2002

Species of fish

Xiphophorus mayae is a fish in the family Poeciliidae. It is found in Central America: eastern Guatemala and western Honduras. This species has red lines on its body which extend on to the upper portion of the caudal fin, males have the lower part of the caudal fin extended into a "sword".
