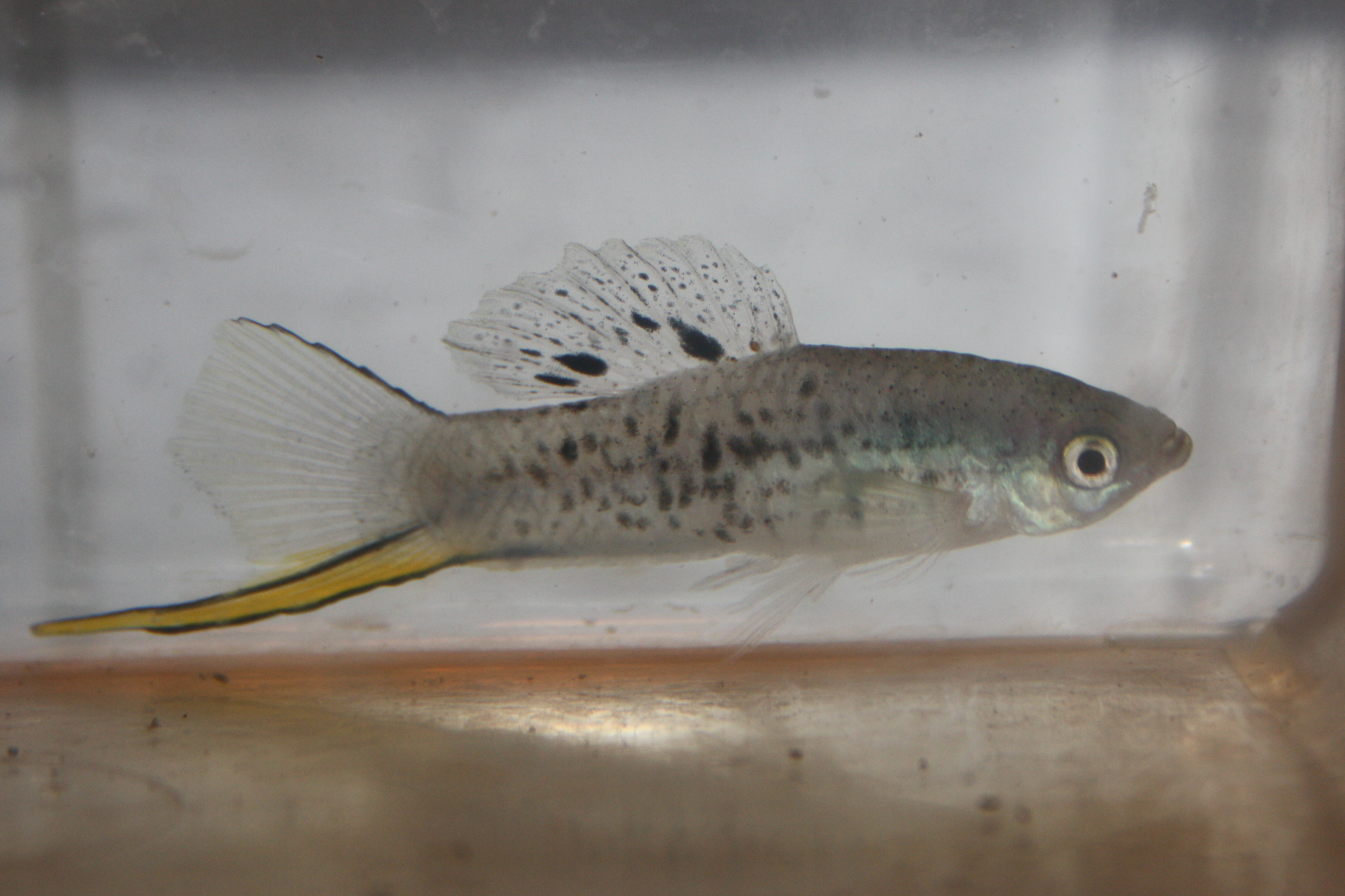
- A male
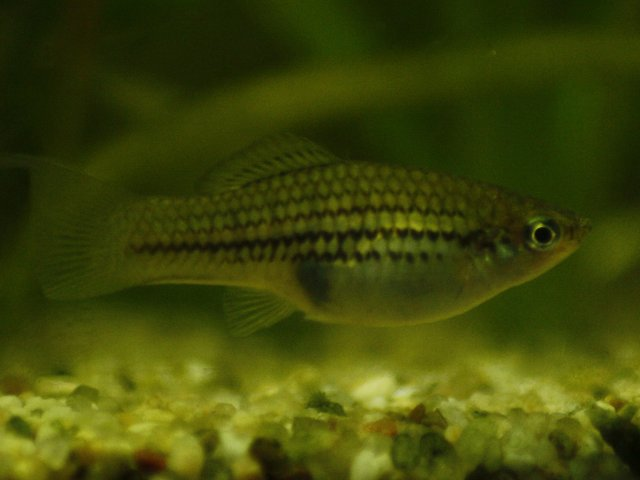
- A female

Conservation status
- Data Deficient (IUCN 3.1)

Scientific classification
- Kingdom: Animalia
- Phylum: Chordata
- Class: Actinopterygii
- Division: Teleostei
- Order: Cyprinodontiformes
- Family: Poeciliidae
- Genus: Xiphophorus
- Species: X. nezahualcoyotl

Binomial name
- Xiphophorus nezahualcoyotl Rauchengerger, Kallman & Morizot, 1990

= Xiphophorus nezahualcoyotl =

Species of fish

Xiphophorus nezahualcoyotl, the mountain swordtail, is a live bearing fish in the family Poeciliidae. It is endemic to the northwestern Pánuco River basin in Mexico. The specific name of this fish refers to the poet, philosopher, and emperor of Texcoco, Nezahualcoyotl (1402–1472).
