= Xiphophorus birchmanni =

Conservation status
- Least Concern (IUCN 3.1)

Scientific classification
- Kingdom: Animalia
- Phylum: Chordata
- Class: Actinopterygii
- Order: Cyprinodontiformes
- Family: Poeciliidae
- Genus: Xiphophorus
- Species: X. birchmanni

Binomial name
- Xiphophorus birchmanni Lechner & Radda, 1987

Species of fish

Xiphophorus birchmanni, commonly known as the sheephead swordtail, is a live bearing fish in the family Poeciliidae.

== Location ==
It is endemic to the Pánuco River basin in central-eastern Mexico.

== Etymology ==
The specific name honours the collector of the type, Heinz Birchmann, from Vienna.
