= Platys Gialos =

Platys Gialos or Platis Yalós:

- Platys Gialos, Mykonos, a village in Mykonos, Greece
- A village in Sifnos, Greece
