= Myron Gordon (biologist) =

American geneticist (1899–1959)

- Born: November 13, 1899
- Died: March 12, 1959 (aged 59)
- Citizenship: American
- Education: Cornell University
- Scientific career
- Fields: Biology and genetics

Myron Gordon (November 13, 1899 – March 12, 1959) was an American biologist and geneticist and became an expert on platy fish Xiphophorus while using them for his pioneering cancer research, starting in the late 1920s. Early papers were published while still a graduate student at Cornell University, but he is best known for his research at New York University and the New York Zoological Society (now Wildlife Conservation Society).

== Education ==
Gordon received his education at Cornell University, achieving first his Bachelor of Science in 1925, going on to study for a Masters of Science in genetics and agriculture, 1925–1926, and finally achieving a Ph.D. in zoology, limnology and genetics in 1929.

=== Activities through summer periods during education ===
In summers, during school, Gordon worked a variety of jobs. He began in 1920 as a keeper at the New York Zoological Park (now the Bronx Zoo) and continued from 1921 to 1923 as a Game Keeper, first at the State of Maryland Game Farm, GwynnBrook, MD. and later in 1923 at the State of New York Game Farm, Middle Island, NY. The summer of 1924 saw him work as a Collector at the College of Agriculture, Cornell University, at McLean Bogs, NY. For two summers after this Gordon was an instructor at Long Island Biological Association, Cold Spring Harbor, Long Island. In 1927, he served as a Biologist with the State of NY Biological Survey (Fisheries) and during the last summers of his Ph.D. he was first an Investigator at Carnegie Institute of Washington, Marine Biological Laboratory, Dry Tortugas, FL. in 1928 and then an Investigator at Marine Biological Laboratory at Woods Hole, Mass. in 1929.

== Professional posts ==
Gordon held a variety of professional posts throughout his career;

- 1925–1929 and 1931–1932: Whilst still studying and just after the completion of his Ph.D., Gordon worked at the Heckscher Foundation for the Advancement of Research at Cornell University. He was in charge of a cooperative study between the departments of zoology, genetics and fish culture devoted to genetics of fishes. In 1932, he was the leader of the second Mexican expedition.
- 1929–1931: In the intervening years between his work with the Heckscher Foundation, Gordon was National Research Fellow at Cornell University, where he was a member of the first expedition to Mexico.
- 1938: Gordon worked on fish melanoma studies in Dr. George M. Smith's laboratory at the International Cancer Research Foundation at Yale University, School of Medicine.
- 1938–1941: For three years, Gordon worked at the John Simon Guggenheim Memorial Foundation.
- 1941: Gordon became a Research Associate in Genetics at the New York Zoological Society. He was in charge of the fish genetics laboratory in the Whitney Wing, American Museum of Natural History (AMNH). He was supported in his research by the National Cancer Institute of the U.S. Public Health Service sponsored by the New York Zoological Society. Gordon held continuous 3-year appointments as a Research Associate with the museum until his death.
- 1944: Gordon was appointed as Assistant Curator of Fishes at the New York Aquarium. He conducted research into the heritable qualities of melanotic tumors in fishes. In 1947, he was given the title of 'geneticist' at the Aquarium.

== Research ==
Whilst at the AMNH he developed advanced systems to study genetic and molecular events in melanoma formation. During his tenure at the museum he published a key review The Melonoma Cell as an Incompletely Differentiated Pigment Cell (in M. Gordon (ed.), Pigment Cell Biology, pp. 215–236. New York: Academic Press. 1959).

== Other endeavors and achievements ==
Herbert Axelrod, of TFH Publications, knowing of Gordon's academic reputation and ability to write clearly on any level, recruited him to write a series of booklets and magazine features aimed at tropical fish hobbyists.

In 1939 he established the Xiphophorus Genetic stock center to provide a reliable supply of genetically identical fish to be used in cancer research. The lines he established remain widely used today. The center was maintained by Gordon and his student Klaus Kallman throughout their tenure at the Aquarium. Kallman transferred it to its current location at Texas State University.

Gordon died suddenly in March, 1959 and his obituary in the Dec 1959 Copeia noted that "…conclusively demonstrated the heritable nature of melanoma in Xiphophorus and the essential relationship of the macromelanophore to its development…" During his collection trips, he discovered and named several new species, and in 1963, Robert Rush Miller and W. L. Minckley named Xiphophorus gordoni in his honor.

== Myron Gordon Award ==
The Myron Gordon Award is presented at the International Pigment Cell Conference (IPCC) in recognition of one or more scientists for distinguished and outstanding contributions to the pigment cell field. Established in 1961 after the death of Myron Gordon in 1959 and first presented at IPCC V. Myron Gordon was instrumental in organizing IPCC I-IV.

=== Previous Winners ===
- 2014 — Greg Barsh
- 2011 — Zalfa Abdel Malek, Ruth Halaban, Shin-ichi Nishikawa
- 2008 — Kowichi Jimbow
- 2005 — Masahiro Mizoguchi
- 2002 — Dorothy C. Bennett
- 1999 — Vincent J. Hearing, Seiji Ito
- 1996 — J. Matsumoto
- 1993 — Patrick A. Riley, Hans Rorsman, Toshihiko Takeuchi
- 1990 — Yutake Mishima
- 1986 — Joseph T. Bagnara, Mac E. Hadley
- 1983 — Annerose Anders, Fritz Anders, Walter C. Quevedo
- 1980 — Makoto Seiji
- 1977 — Howard S. Mason, Giuseppe Prota
- 1975 — Vernon Riley
- 1972 — Eleanor Josephine Macdonald, V.J. McGovern
- 1969 — Aaron B. Lerner
- 1965 — Thomas B. Fitzpatrick
- 1961 — G.A. Swan
