= Wendell L. Minckley =

American zoologist (1935–2001)

Wendell Lee Minckley (November 13, 1935 – June 22, 2001) was a college professor and a leading expert on fish. He spent most of his career at Arizona State University.

In 1963, he, with Robert Rush Miller, discovered and named the northern platyfish (Xiphophorus gordoni) in honor of Dr. Myron Gordon. Dr. Minckley, in turn, had five species named in his honor.

Dr. Minckley died on June 22, 2001, in Desert Samaritan Hospital in Mesa, Arizona, from complications associated with treatment for cancer.

== Legacy ==
In 1963, he, with Robert Rush Miller, discovered and named the northern platyfish (Xiphophorus gordoni) in honor of Dr. Myron Gordon. Dr. Minckley, in turn, had five species named in his honor.

The freshwater snail genus Minckleyella Hershler, Liu & Landye, 2011 is named in honor of him.

Minckley's cichlid Herichthys minckleyi is named after him.

Dr. Minckley's work was vital in understanding and protecting native wildlife in the Southwest.

== See also ==
- Category:Taxa named by Wendell L. Minckley
