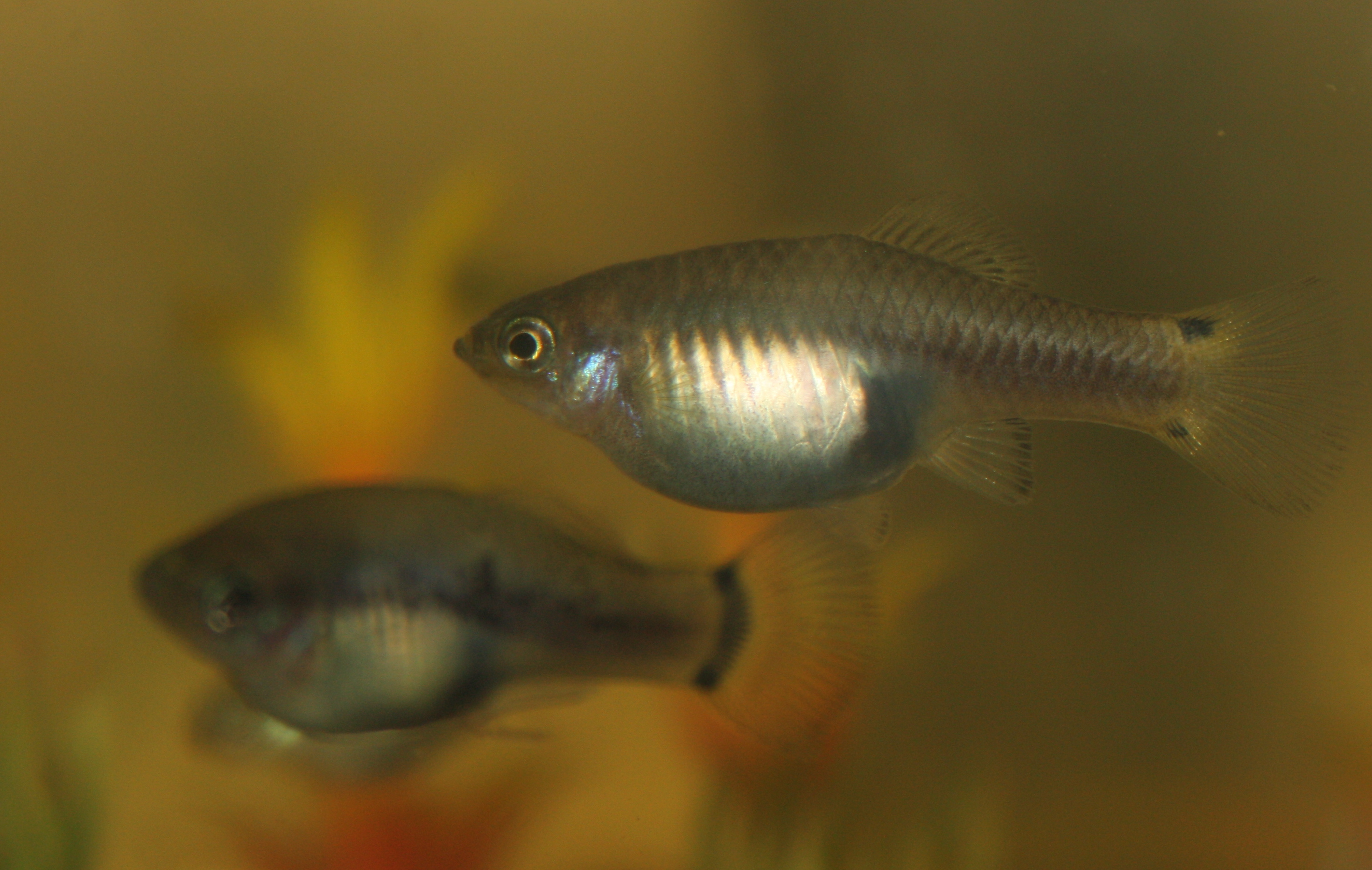

Conservation status
- Least Concern (IUCN 3.1)

Scientific classification
- Kingdom: Animalia
- Phylum: Chordata
- Class: Actinopterygii
- Order: Cyprinodontiformes
- Family: Poeciliidae
- Genus: Xiphophorus
- Species: X. xiphidium

Binomial name
- Xiphophorus xiphidium (Hubbs & Gordon in Friedman & Gordon, 1934)

Synonyms
- Platypoecilus xiphidium Hubbs & Gordon in Friedman & Gordon, 1934 Basionym; Xiphophorus xiphidium Gordon, 1932 lapsus, but in common use

= Swordtail platyfish =

Species of fish

The swordtail platyfish (Xiphophorus xiphidium) is a species of ray-finned fish in the family Poeciliidae. The species is endemic to the Soto La Marina River basin in Tamaulipas and Nuevo León. It lives in springs, streams, arroyos, ditches, marshes, and ponds in slow-flowing clear to muddy waters, often over mud, clay, gravel, and rock where vegetation is typically abundant. Males grow 3 cm (1.2 in) in length whereas females grow to 4 cm (1.6 in) in length, however both sexes can reach 1 cm (0.4 in) over their usual length. Gestation is usually 24 to 35 days, where around 20 to 50 young are born.

== Conservation ==
There are currently no conservation efforts towards the swordtail platyfish; however, its range does overlap in the Altas Cumbres Protected Area outside of Ciudad Victoria. Threats, such as cattle ranching degrading coastal streams and rivers due to runoff and water management in the Soto la Marina River, are potential threats to the species; however, the exact impact is not known. This species occurs in the aquarium trade; however, most of this trade is done through captive bred individuals. The species is widely distributed and has no signs of major population declines. For these reasons, the IUCN Red List has assessed the swordtail platyfish as 'Least concern'.
