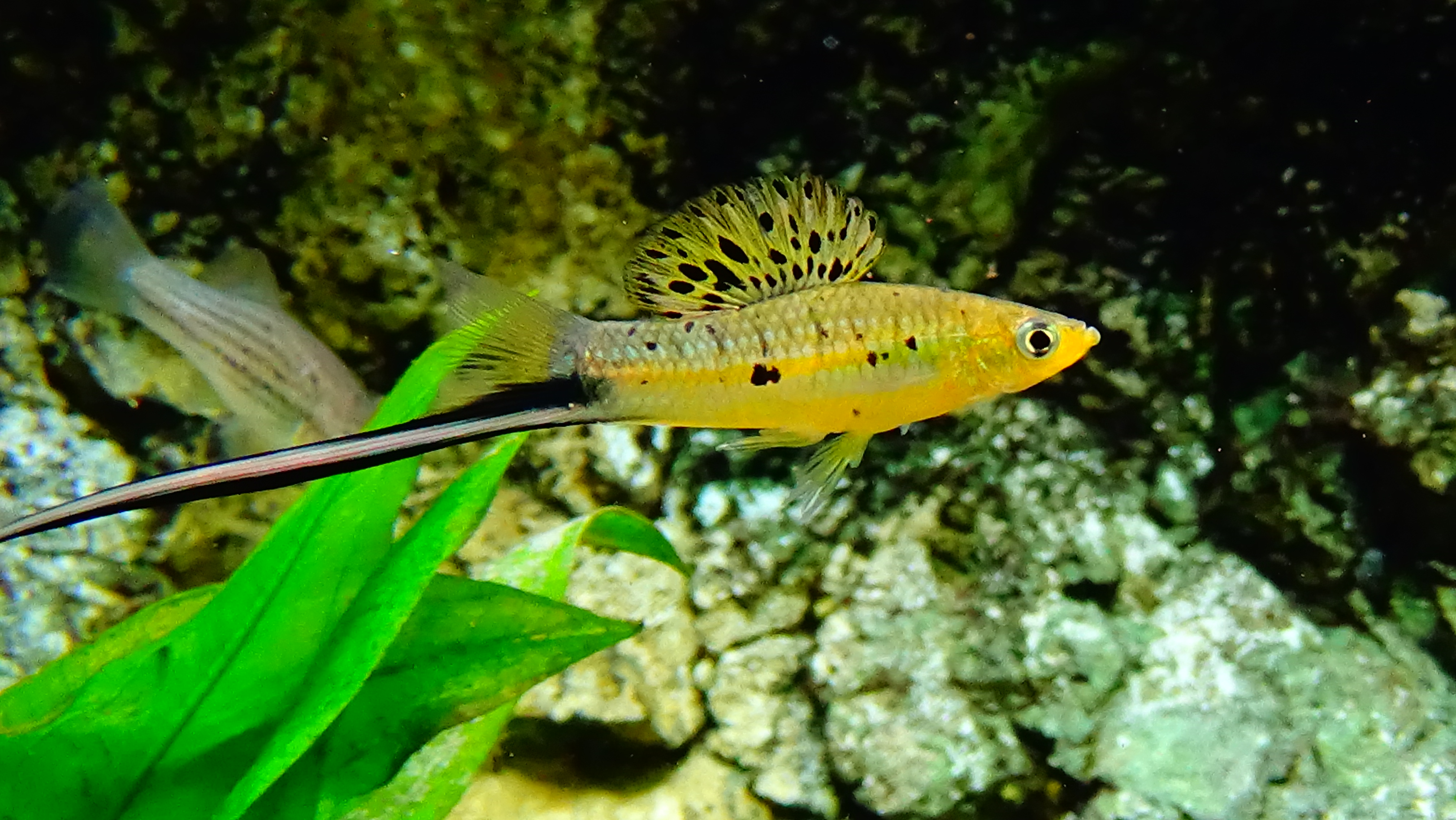
- Male
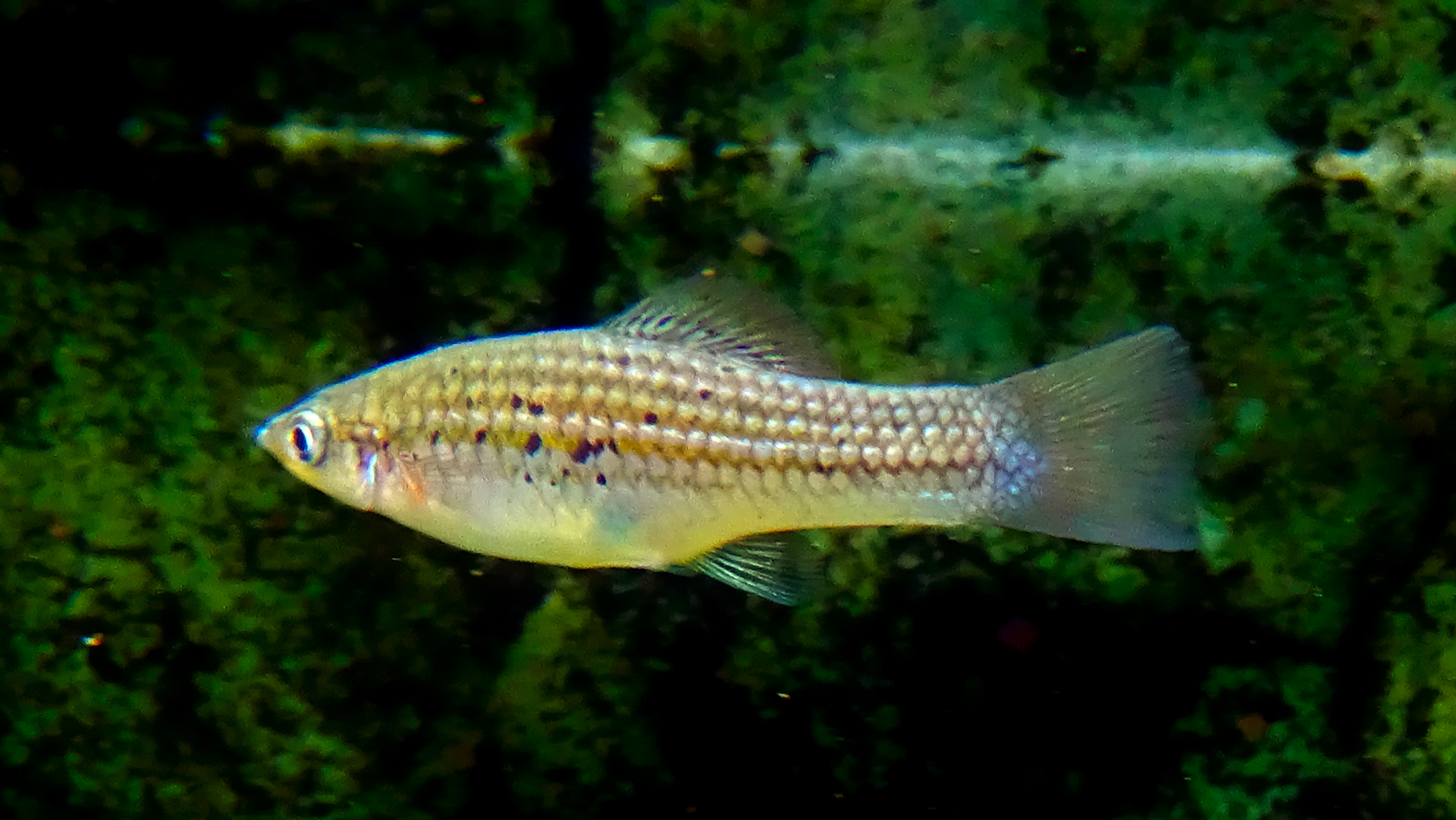
- Female

Conservation status
- Data Deficient (IUCN 3.1)

Scientific classification
- Kingdom: Animalia
- Phylum: Chordata
- Class: Actinopterygii
- Order: Cyprinodontiformes
- Family: Poeciliidae
- Genus: Xiphophorus
- Species: X. montezumae

Binomial name
- Xiphophorus montezumae D. S. Jordan & Snyder, 1899

= Xiphophorus montezumae =

Species of fish

Xiphophorus montezumae, the Montezuma swordtail, is a livebearing freshwater fish of the order Cyprinodontiformes, family Poeciliidae, and genus Xiphophorus. It is in the same genus as the common platy and the swordtail. Xiphophorus means 'sword-bearer' in Greek.

== Description ==
Growing to a maximum length of around 7.5 cm (3.0 in), the females are larger in size than the males. The genus Xiphophorus is common in freshwater aquariums. The males of this particular species are known for their metallic green scales and the fact that their "sword" stays horizontal unlike most species where it is angled downward.

== General references ==
Alderton, David (2005). Doran, Joanne; Tuite, Simon; Griffiths, Lee; Heilman, Christine (eds.). Encyclopedia of Aquarium & Pond Fish. Photography by Max Gibbs. Dorling Kindersley. ISBN 0-7566-6838-7.
