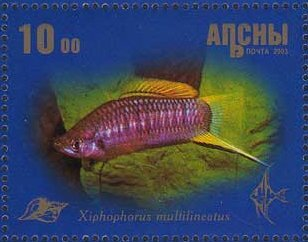

Scientific classification
- Kingdom: Animalia
- Phylum: Chordata
- Class: Actinopterygii
- Order: Cyprinodontiformes
- Family: Poeciliidae
- Genus: Xiphophorus
- Species: X. multilineatus

Binomial name
- Xiphophorus multilineatus Rauchengerger, Kallman & Morizot, 1990

= Xiphophorus multilineatus =

Species of fish

Xiphophorus multilineatus is a fish in the family Poeciliidae. It is endemic to a small part of the Pánuco River basin in Mexican.
