= Genetic stock center =

Genetic stock centers are collections of pure genetic stock available for use in research. They are often housed at research universities, and include everything from single cell life to plants, fish, and small mammals such as mice and rats. Genetic Stock Centers often charge for research stock on a two tier scale, with non profit researchers getting stock at a lower cost than commercial researchers. Dr Myron Gordon, for example, established the Xiphophorus genetic stock center in 1939 to raise pure strains when he realized that certain Xiphophorus hybrids would be useful in cancer research. He understood that his research could not be duplicated by other scientists without pure genetic stock to use as a base. The strains that Dr Gordon started remain pure and are used to this day.
