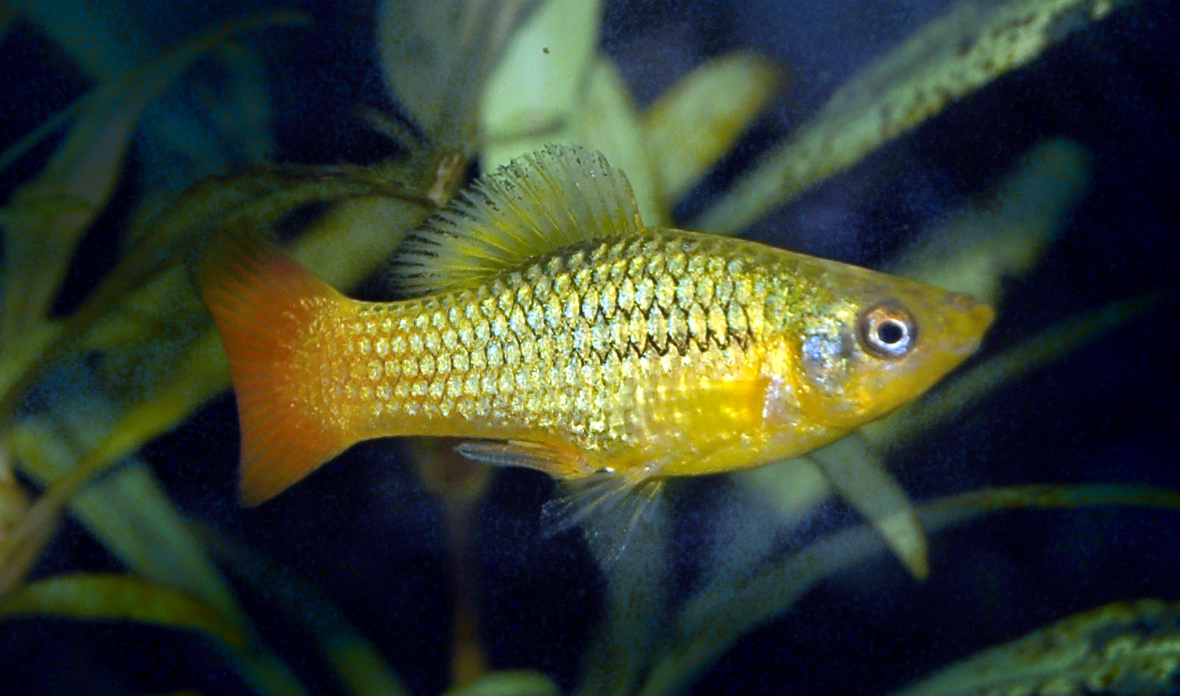
- An ornamental strain male

Conservation status
- Least Concern (IUCN 3.1)

Scientific classification
- Kingdom: Animalia
- Phylum: Chordata
- Class: Actinopterygii
- Order: Cyprinodontiformes
- Family: Poeciliidae
- Genus: Xiphophorus
- Species: X. variatus

Binomial name
- Xiphophorus variatus (Meek, 1904)

Synonyms
- Platypoecilus variatus Meek, 1904

= Variable platyfish =

Species of fish

The variable platyfish (Xiphophorus variatus), also known as variatus platy or variegated platy, is a species of freshwater fish in the family Poeciliidae of the order Cyprinodontiformes. A livebearer, it is native to southern Tamaulipas and northern Veracruz states in northeastern Mexico. Due to its prolific breeding, it is a popular fish in the aquarium trade, as are hybrids with other members of its genus, most notably the southern platyfish.

== Description ==
The variable platyfish grows to a maximum overall length of 7.0 cm (2.8 in). In the wild, they are olive in colour with black marbling or spots on the side of the caudal peduncle. Large males show blackish blotches on the dorsal fin. Unlike some other members of the genus, X. variatus has no claw at the tip of the fifth anal fin ray. The fourth pectoral ray shows well-developed serrae (saw-like notches). They typically have 20 to 24 lateral scales, 10 to 12 dorsal rays and two rows of jaw teeth. Males exhibit a more pointed or "needle-like" anal fin, known as a gonopodium, whereas the female have a more triangular anal fin.

== Range and habitat ==
The variable platyfish is endemic to the Atlantic slope of Mexico from southern Tamaulipas south to northern Veracruz. It is considered uncommon across its range. The species has also been introduced and become established in a number of locales, largely due to releases related to the aquariums trade. In the United States, they have been established in canals along the eastern shore of Tampa Bay, Florida, as well as in Gainesville. They are also naturalised in springs in the counties of Beaverhead, Granite and Madison in Montana. The species has been spread to a number of other countries outside of its range, including Colombia, Singapore, and Hong Kong, the latter of which reports a negative impact on native species due to its prodigious breeding.

The fish's habitats include slow-moving waters of vegetated canals, ditches, and warm springs. Omnivorous, its diet includes both plants and small crustaceans, insects, and annelid worms.

== Aquarium trade ==
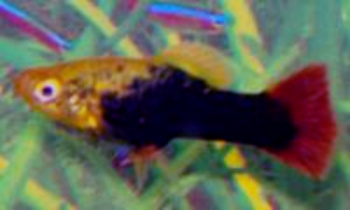
Male "Tuxedo" variatus platy

The variable platyfish is bred commercially for the aquarium hobby. It is popular due to its often colourful and variable patterns and its ability to survive in cooler waters than other fish; it can comfortably live at temperatures between 16 and 24 °C (61 and 75 °F). The species has also been used in genetic research.
