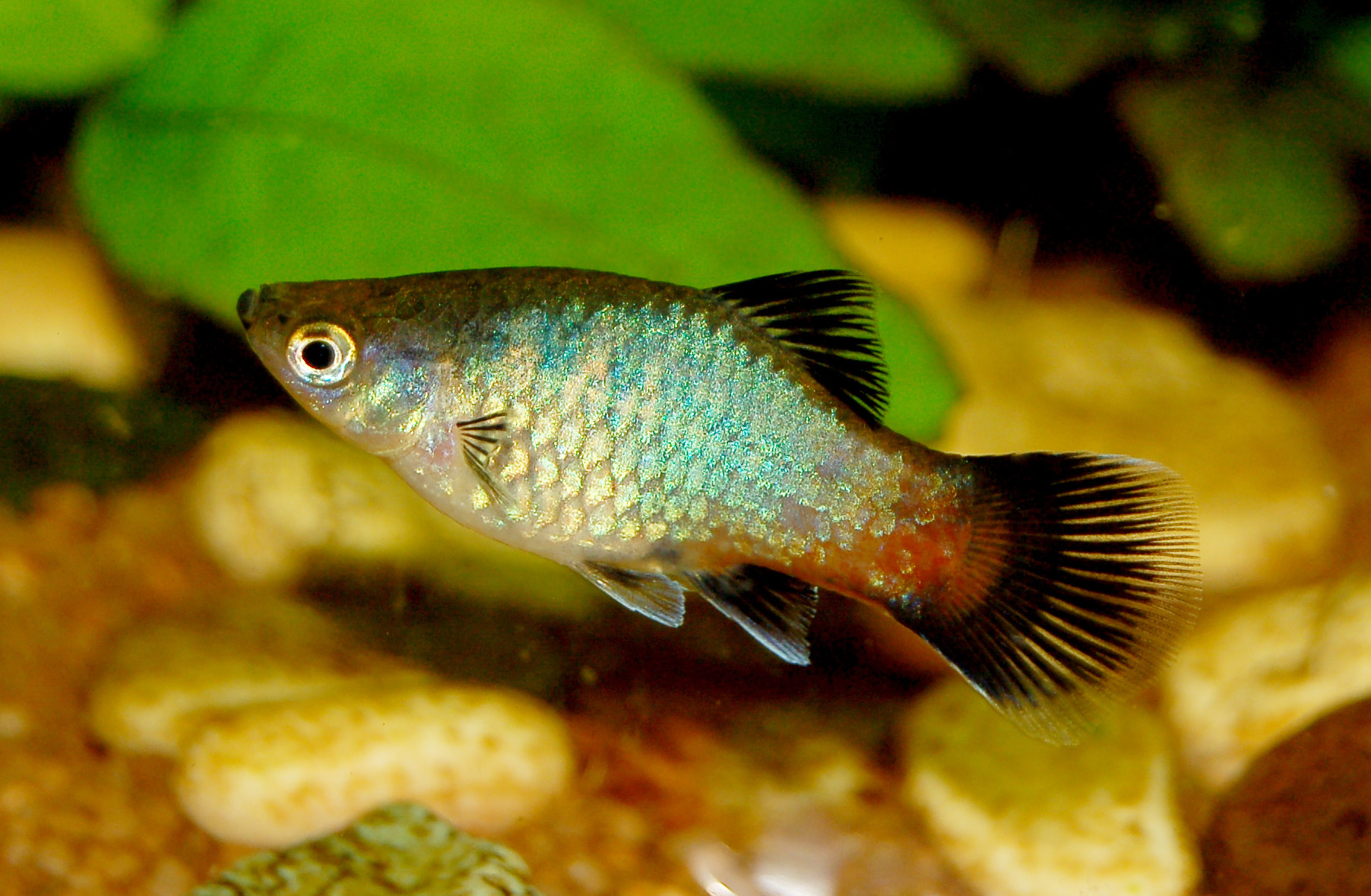
- Female 'rainbow wagtail' platy

Conservation status
- Data Deficient (IUCN 3.1)

- Secure (NatureServe)

Scientific classification
- Kingdom: Animalia
- Phylum: Chordata
- Class: Actinopterygii
- Division: Teleostei
- Order: Cyprinodontiformes
- Family: Poeciliidae
- Genus: Xiphophorus
- Species: X. maculatus

Binomial name
- Xiphophorus maculatus (Günther, 1866)

= Southern platyfish =

Species of fish

The southern platyfish, common platy, or moonfish (Xiphophorus maculatus) is a species of freshwater fish in family Poeciliidae of order Cyprinodontiformes. A live-bearer, it is closely related to the green swordtail (X. hellerii) and can interbreed with it. It is native to an area of North and Central America stretching from Veracruz, Mexico, to northern Belize.

The southern platyfish grows to a maximum overall length of 6.0 cm (2.4 in). Sexual dimorphism is slight, the male's caudal fin being more pointed. The anal fin of the male fish has evolved into a gonopodium, a stick-shaped organ used for reproduction. The female southern platyfish's anal fin is fan shaped. Wild varieties are drab in coloration, lacking the distinctive dark lateral line common to many Xiphophorus species.

Xiphophorus maculatus prefers slow-moving waters of canals, ditches, and warm springs. Omnivorous, its diet includes both plants and small crustaceans, insects, and annelid worms.

Breeders have developed a multitude of color varieties (e.g. orange, red, yellow, red/black, and black/white) which are common aquarium fish for hobbyists.

The southern platyfish is commonly known simply as the platy (pl. platys or platies), from the fish's original generic name, Platypoecilus.

== Nonindigenous occurrences ==
This species has been recorded from Orange County, California, near Westminster; near a fish farm in Conejos County and the South Platte drainage, Colorado; several counties in Florida; Hawaii; an unnamed tributary to Big Branch Bayou in Lacombe, Louisiana; Beaverhead Rock Pond (Madison County), Montana; Clark County, Nevada; and Texas. It has also been collected in the Loiza drainage near Loiza Reservoir, Quebrada Honda, and Rio Abajo Forest Station north of Utuado in Puerto Rico.

The southern platyfish has been released probably due to fish farm or aquarium releases. Specimens in Louisiana were collected near a tropical fish farm. Southern platies, and other introduced poeciliids, have been implicated in the decline of native damselflies on Oahu, Hawaii. Often the distributions of the damselflies and introduced fishes were found to be mutually exclusive, probably resulting from competition for limited insect food.

== In the aquarium ==
Platies are easy to keep and well suited to a community aquarium. They prefer water with a 7.0–8.0 pH, a water hardness of 9.0–19.0 dGH, and a temperature range of 18–25 °C (64–77 °F).

In captivity, they reach maturity in three to four months, and breed readily, the females giving birth to about 20–40 young at a time. Often young are eaten by the adults or other inhabitants of a communal aquarium but given plants and gravel to hide in, some will probably survive as these are hardy fish. Platy young are first seen at approx 7mm long and will use cover to hide from predators and to look for food. Specialist fry food is available but any flake food, frozen or live food that floats their way will be easily consumed. These require excellent water quality and care must be taken to avoid fry being sucked up into a gravel cleaning syphon. A thin membrane covering the syphon opening such as a clean pair of tights will minimise this.

The fish commonly sold in pet shops is not a pure strain of X. maculatus, but is a hybrid between X. hellerii and X. maculatus. In general, if the male has a sword-shaped tail, they are called swordtails. Otherwise, they are labeled platy. (However, this basic assessment does not take into consideration the undeniable fact that the majority of fishes sold as 'platies' do share the same stout form as the wild X. maculatus, whilst aquarium 'hybrid' swordtail strains likewise share the longer, larger body-form of the wild X. hellerii, so caudal extension is not the sole differentiator and it is clear that decades of selective breeding have reinforced, within each captive strain, the appropriate or typical – and therefore desired – body shape of the name types.) Color and fin shape vary wildly in the aquarium trade.

A common statement in the trade is that it is harder to stop them breeding than to make them do so, with 'surprise' fry appearing in community tanks regularly.

== Genetics ==
The genome of Xiphophorus maculatus was sequenced in 2013.

== Sex ==
The southern platyfish has three sex chromosomes W, X, and Y, that interact with autosomal genes. This creates a highly complex sex determination system.

- The Y chromosome carries a dominant male-determining gene (M), which is thought to be homologous to the mammalian SRY gene located on the Y chromosome.
- The W chromosome carries a suppressor gene (S) that inhibits the activity of the male-determining gene (M) on the Y chromosome. This explains why WY individuals develop as females.
- The X chromosome lacks the suppressor gene (S) found on the W chromosome, allowing XY and YY individuals to develop as males.

There are 4 autosomal alleles that intervene in the sex determination system:

- A recessive autosomal factor a, can, in its homozygous state (aa), activate the male-determining gene on the X chromosome. This leads to the development of XX males.
- Two recessive alleles b and c, likely acting in concert, can activate the male-determining gene located on the W chromosome. This activation can result in WW, WX, and even WY individuals developing as males. The b factor appears to specifically suppress the W-linked suppressor (S).
- The dominant T allele interacts with a specific variant of the Y chromosome (designated as Y') to promote female development in some XY individuals.

Sex chromosome combinations in Xiphophorus maculatus
Genotype	Sex
WW	Female
WX	Female
WY	Female
XX	Usually female, but can be male under the influence of autosomal factors
XY	Usually Male, but can be female with the Y' chromosome and T autosomal allele.
YY	Male

== Gallery ==
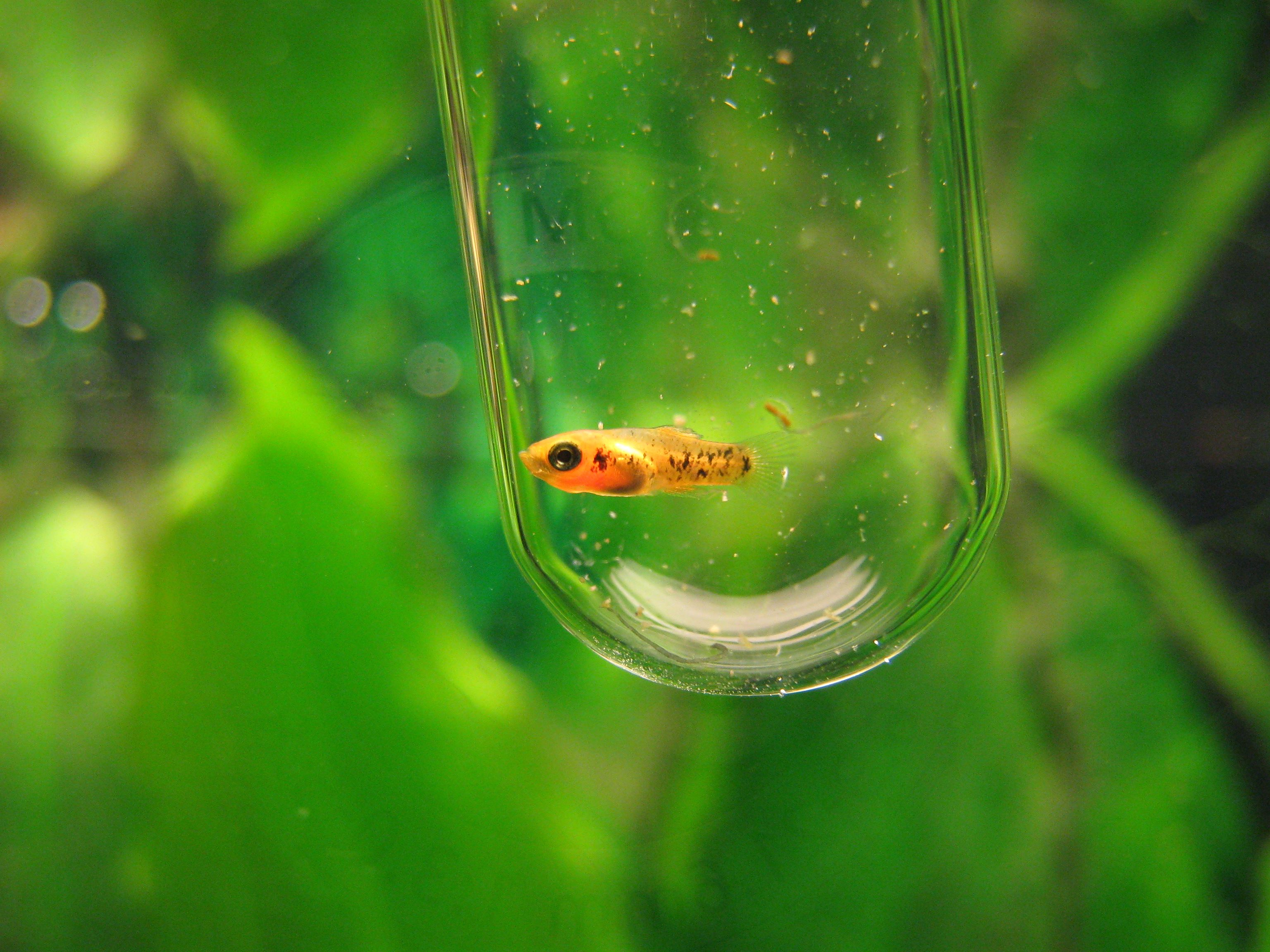
Fry

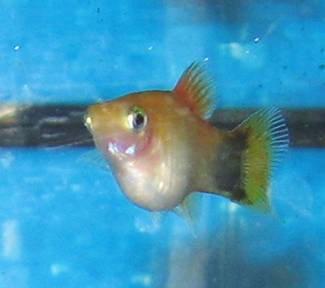
Pregnant female

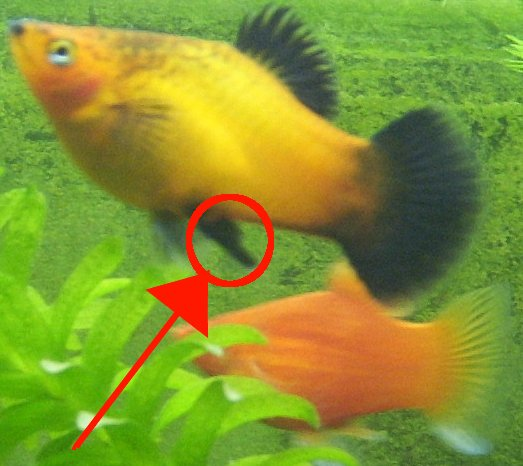
Male platy with gonopodium

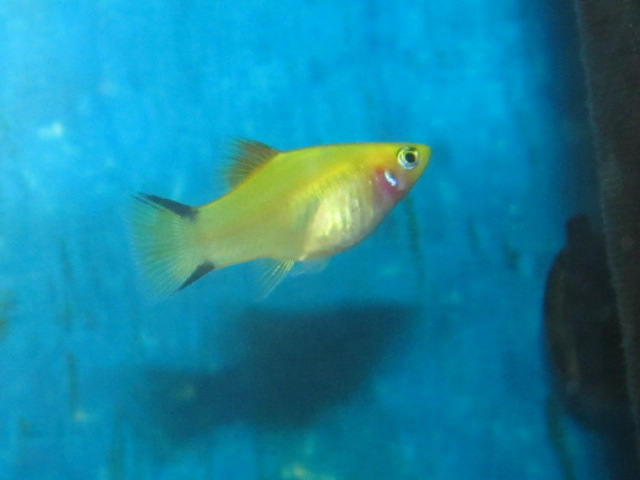
Female 'Twin Bar' or 'Comet' platy

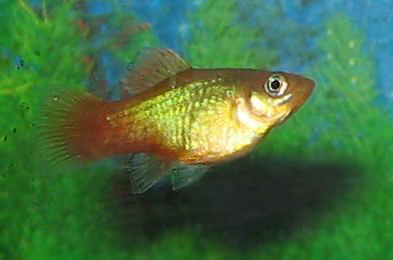
'Sunset' platy

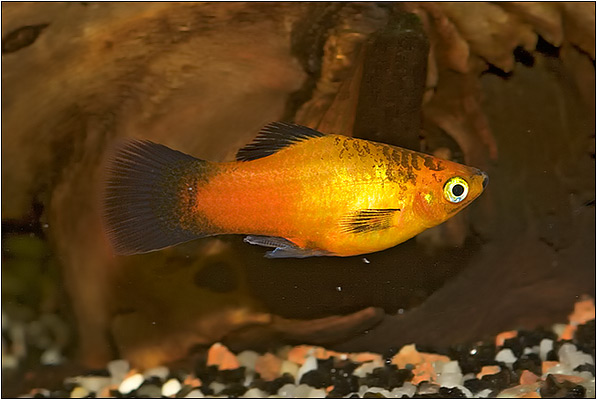
Wagtail platy

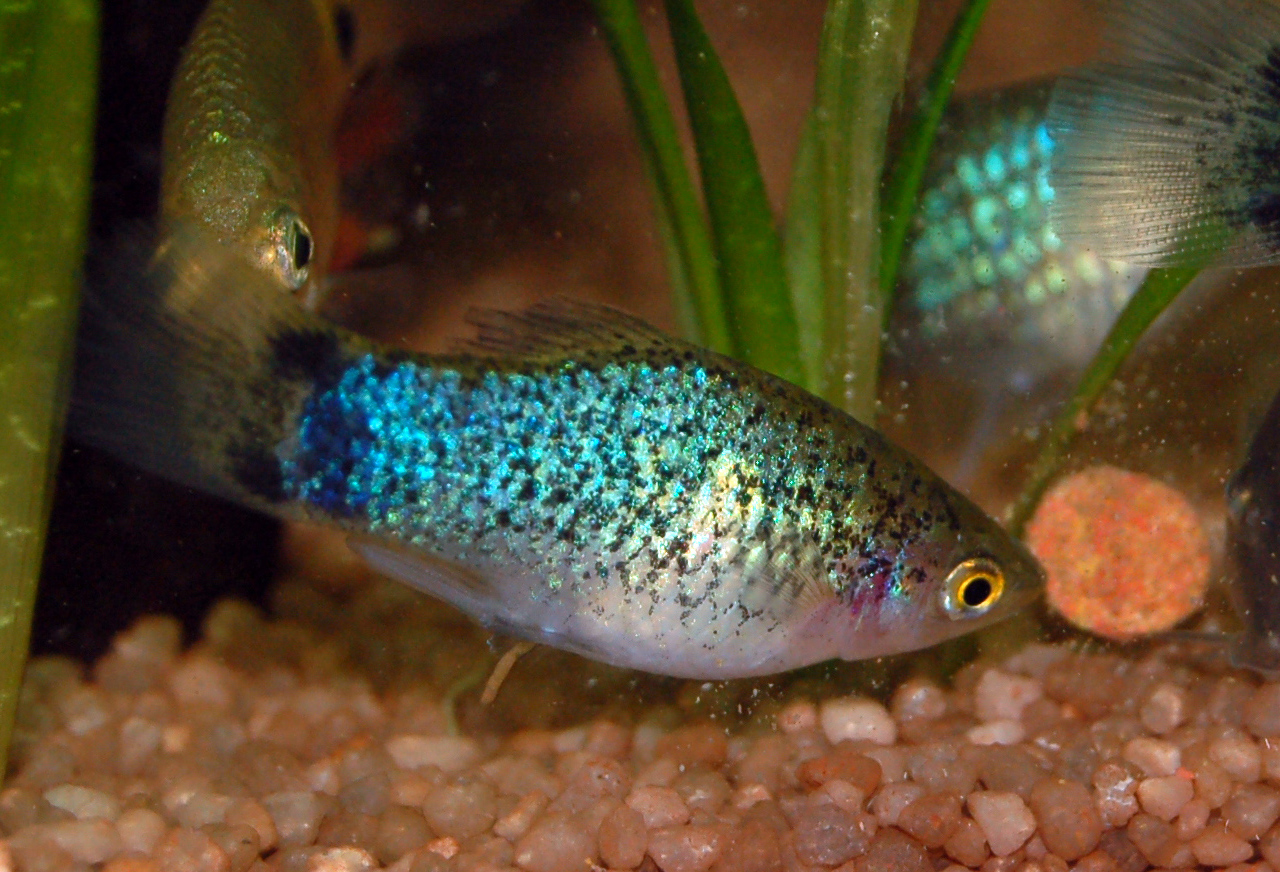
Blue platy

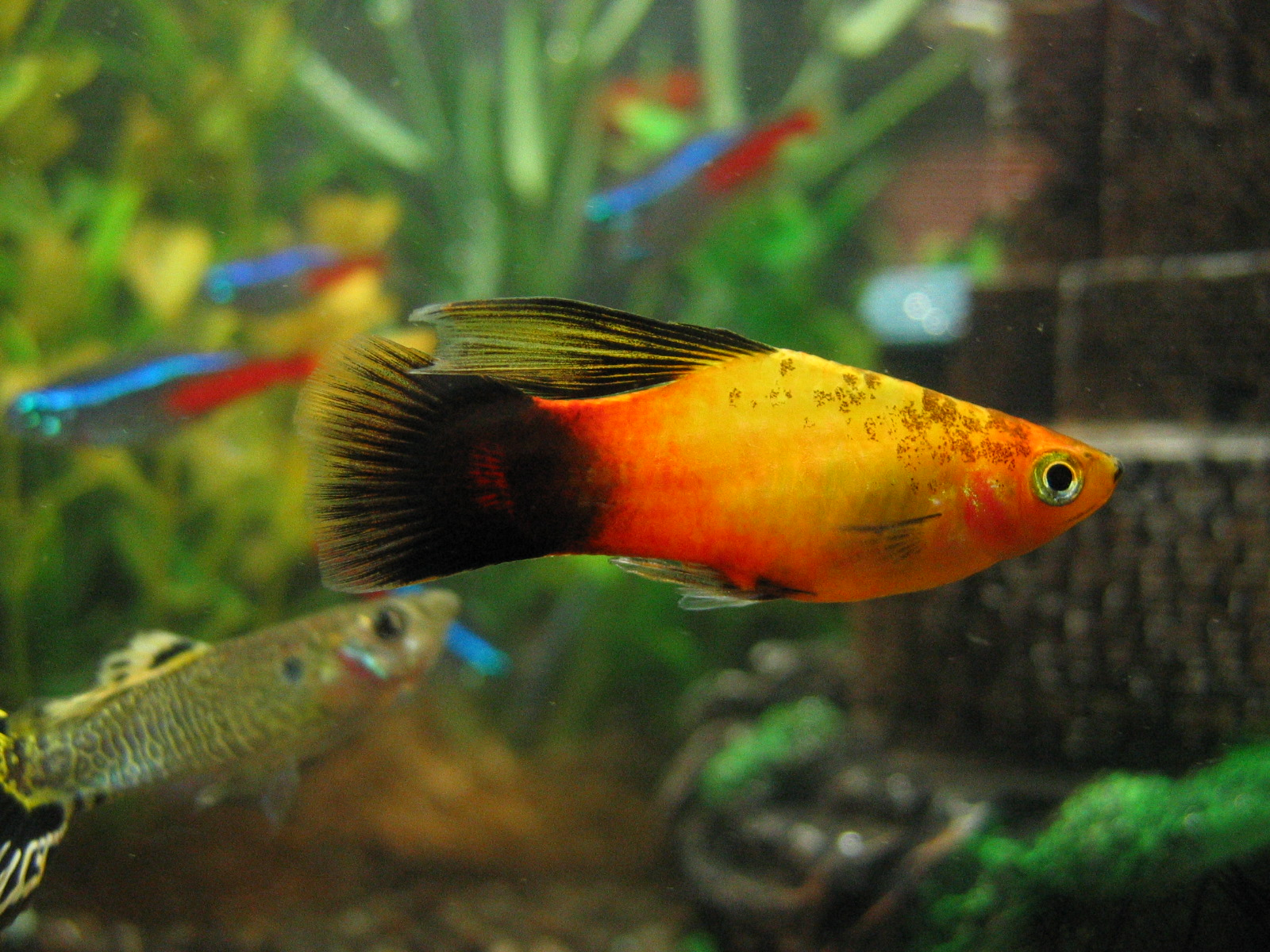
'Hi-fin' wagtail

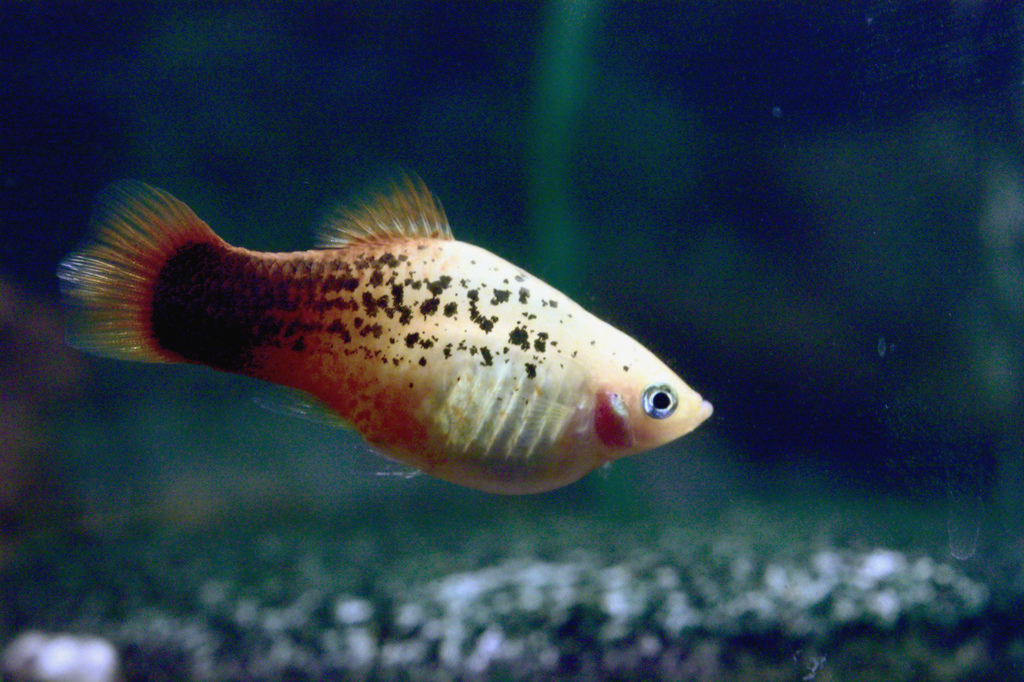
Red 'Salt and Pepper' platy

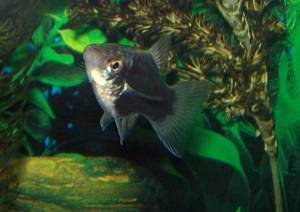
Female black platy
