= Donn Eric Rosen =

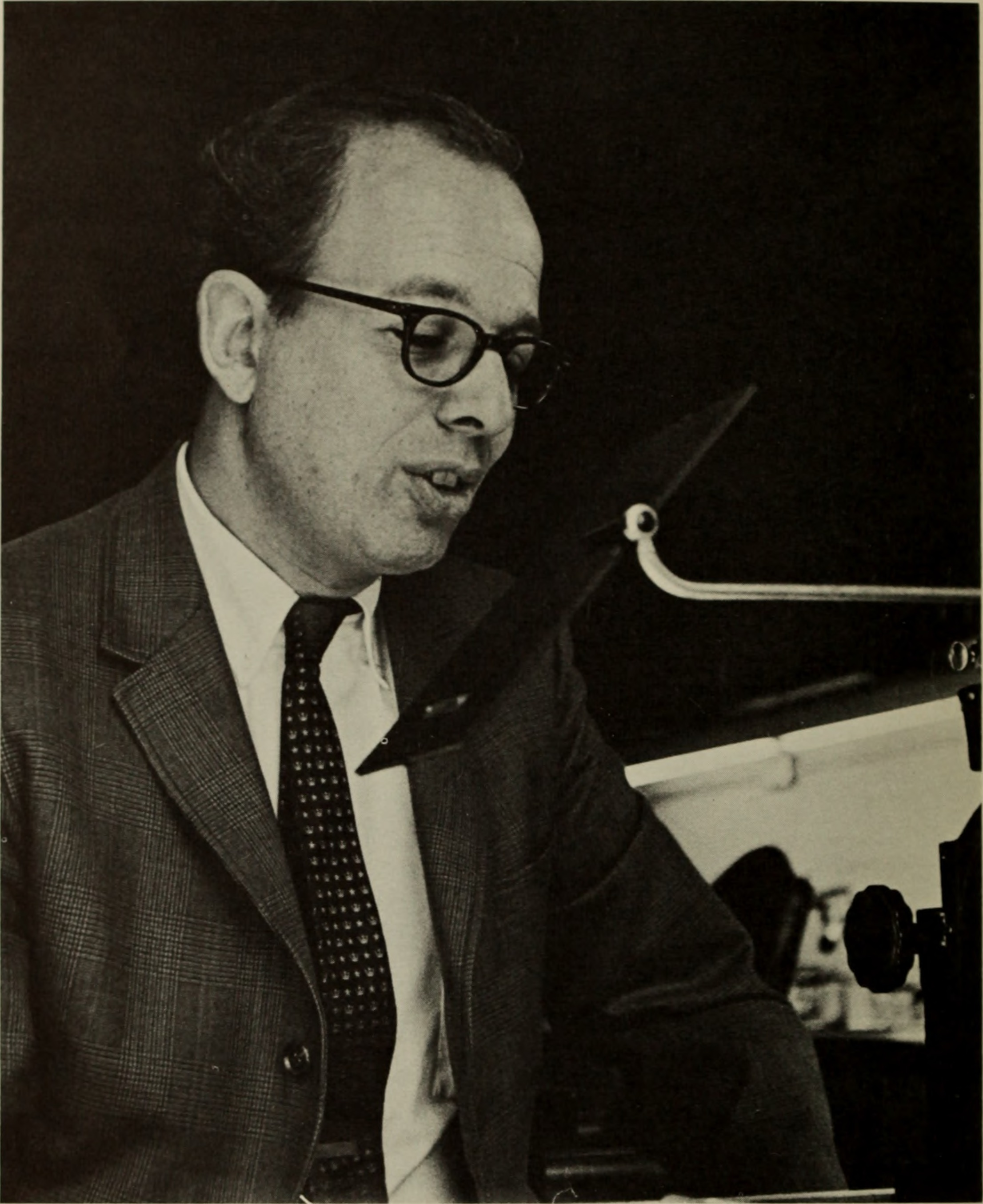
- Born: January 9, 1929; New York City, New York
- Died: September 22, 1986 (aged 57); Closter, New Jersey
- Education: New York University
- Parents: Irwin Rosen (father); Anita Gerber Rosen (mother)
- Relatives: Charles Rosen (brother)
- Scientific career
- Fields: Ichthyology
- Workplaces: American Museum of Natural History
- Doctoral students: Edward Orlando Wiley III Roger Lansing Grande

Donn Eric Rosen (1929-1986) was a member of the staff of the American Museum of Natural History. He was a Distinguished Fellow of the American Society of Ichthyologists and Herpetologists.

== Family ==
Born to immigrants Irwin Rosen (b. 1885) and Anita Gerber Rosen (b. 1906), Rosen has an older brother: Charles Welles. Both his parents were born in Russia. Irwin came to the United States in 1889 and had a career in architecture. Anita arrived in the United States prior to 1920.

Donn E. Rosen married Carmela Berritto, and they had three sons, one of whom, Philip Clark Rosen (1955-2020) was a herpetologist and ecologist, who spent many years studying the Sonoran Desert.

== Works ==
Rosen earned his degree in 1955, his master's in 1957, and his doctorate in 1959, all from New York University. In 1961 he joined the staff of the American Museum of Natural History, and was chairman of the department of ichthyology from 1965 to 1975, presiding over a collection that grew from 500,000 to 1.5 million specimens.

Rosen was awarded the Frederick Stoye Award for Ichthyology from the American Society of Ichthyologists and Herpetologists in 1952 and 1954, the Leidy Medal of the Academy of Natural Sciences of Philadelphia in 1967, and served as president of the Society of Systematic Zoology from 1975 to 1977.

Rosen authored numerous scientific papers and monographs, and described twenty-three species.

== Selected publications ==
- Rosen, Donn Eric; Greenwood, P. Humphry (August 26, 1970). "Origin of the Weberian Apparatus and the Relationships of the Ostariophysan and Gonorynchiform Fishes". American Museum Novitates (2428). New York, New York, USA: American Museum of Natural History.
- Rosen, Donn Eric; Bailey, Reeve M. (1963). "The Poeciliid Fishes (Cyprinodontiformes), Their Structure, Zoogeography, and Systematics". Bulletin of the American Museum of Natural History. 126 (1): 59. hdl:2246/1123.
- Cohen, Daniel M.; Ebeling, Alfred W.; Iwamoto, Tomio; McDowell, Samuel B.; Marshall, N. B.; Rosen, Donn E.; Sonoda, Pearl; Weed, Walter H. III; Woods, Loren P. (October 23, 2018). Orders Heteromi (Notacanthiformes), Berycomorphi (Beryciformes), Xenoberyces (Stephanoberyciformes), Anacanthini (Gadiformes): Part 6. Yale University Press. ISBN 978-1-933789163 – via Google Books.
- Rosen, Donn Eric (1973). "Interrelationships of higher euteleostean fishes". In Greenwood, P.H.; Miles, R.S. & Patterson, Colin (eds.). Interrelationships of Fishes. Academic Press. pp. 397–513. ISBN 0-12-300850-6.
- Croizat, Léon; Nelson, Gareth & Rosen, Donn Eric (June 1974). "Centers of Origin and Related Concepts". Systematic Zoology. 23 (2): 265–287. doi:10.1093/sysbio/23.2.265.

== Legacy ==
=== Species named after Rosen ===
- The Ricefish Adrianichthys roseni Parenti & Soeroto, 2004, (Adrianichthyidae)
- Brachyrhaphis roseni W. A. Bussing, 1988, (Poeciliidae)
- Curimata roseni Vari, 1984, (Curimatidae)
- The eel Meadia roseni H. K. Mok, C. Y. Lee & H. J. Chan, 1991 is named after him, (Synaphobranchidae)
- Rakthamichthys roseni (R. M. Bailey & Gans, 1998) (Synbranchidae)
- Sternarchorhynchus roseni Mago-Leccia, 1994 (Rosen's tube-snouted ghost knifefish) (Apteronotidae)
- Xiphophorus roseni M. K. Meyer & Wischnath, 1981 (Poeciliidae)

== See also ==
- Category:Taxa named by Donn Eric Rosen
