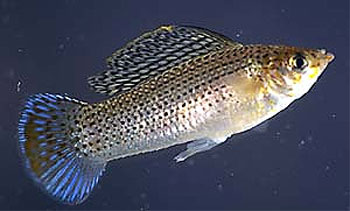
- Sailfin molly Poecilia latipinna

Scientific classification
- Kingdom: Animalia
- Phylum: Chordata
- Class: Actinopterygii
- Order: Cyprinodontiformes
- Family: Poeciliidae
- Subfamily: Poeciliinae; Bonaparte, 1831

= Poeciliinae =

Subfamily of fishes

Poeciliinae is a subfamily of killifish from the family Poeciliidae which contains species from the Americas which are collectively known as the livebearers because many, but not all, of the species within the subfamily are ovoviviparous.

== Characteristics ==
All of the members of the subfamily Poeciliinae are ovoviviparous, i.e. they give birth to live young, except Tomereus, with internal fertilisation and a large yolk in the egg. The males have the anterior rays, normally the third to fifth rays, in the anal fin elongated to form an intromittent organ called the gonopodium.

== Habitat and distribution ==
The Poeciliinae are predominantly freshwater fish but some species live in brackish water, and some can even tolerate seawater. They are found in North America as far north as southern Canada, Central America and South America through to Patagonia. Some of the world's most popular aquarium fish such as guppies, swordtails and mollies are from this subfamily. They have been introduced to many regions in the world, either accidentally or to control mosquitoes, and have become invasive species threatening local populations of similar, small fishes. For example, the Eastern mosquitofish Gambusia holbrooki is considered to be one of the 100 worst invasive species in the world and is responsible for declines in small native aquatic species worldwide.

== Subdivisions ==
The following tribes and genera are classified within the subfamily Poeciliinae:

- Tribe Alfarini Hubbs, 1924
  - Genus Alfaro Meek, 1912
- Tribe Priapellini Ghedotti, 2000
  - Genus Priapella Regan 1913
- Tribe Gambusiini Gill, 1889
  - Genus Belonesox Kner, 1860
  - Genus Brachyrhaphis Regan, 1913
  - Genus Gambusia Poey, 1854
  - Genus Heterophallus Regan, 1914
- Tribe Heterandriini Hubbs, 1924
  - Genus Heterandria Agassiz, 1853
  - Genus Neoheterandria Henn 1916
  - Genus Poeciliopsis Regan 1913
  - Genus Priapichthys Regan 1913
  - Genus Pseudopoecilia Regan 1913
  - Genus Pseudoxiphophorus Bleeker, 1860
  - Genus Xenophallus Hubbs, 1924
- Tribe Girardini Hubbs, 1924
  - Genus Carlhubbsia Whitley, 1951
  - Genus Girardinus Poey, 1854
  - Genus Quintana Hubbs, 1934
- Tribe Poeciliini Bonaparte, 1831
  - Genus Limia Poey, 1854
  - Genus Micropoecilia Hubbs, 1926
  - Genus Pamphorichthys Regan, 1913
  - Genus Phallichthys Hubbs, 1924
  - Genus Poecilia Bloch & Schneider, 1801
  - Genus Xiphophorus Heckel, 1848
- Tribe Cnesterodontini Hubbs, 1924
  - Genus Cnesterodon Garman, 1895
  - Genus Phalloceros C. H. Eigenmann, 1907
  - Genus Phalloptychus Eigenmann, 1907
  - Genus Phallotorynus Henn, 1916
- Tribe Scolichthyini Rosen, 1967
  - Genus Scolichthys Rosen, 1967
