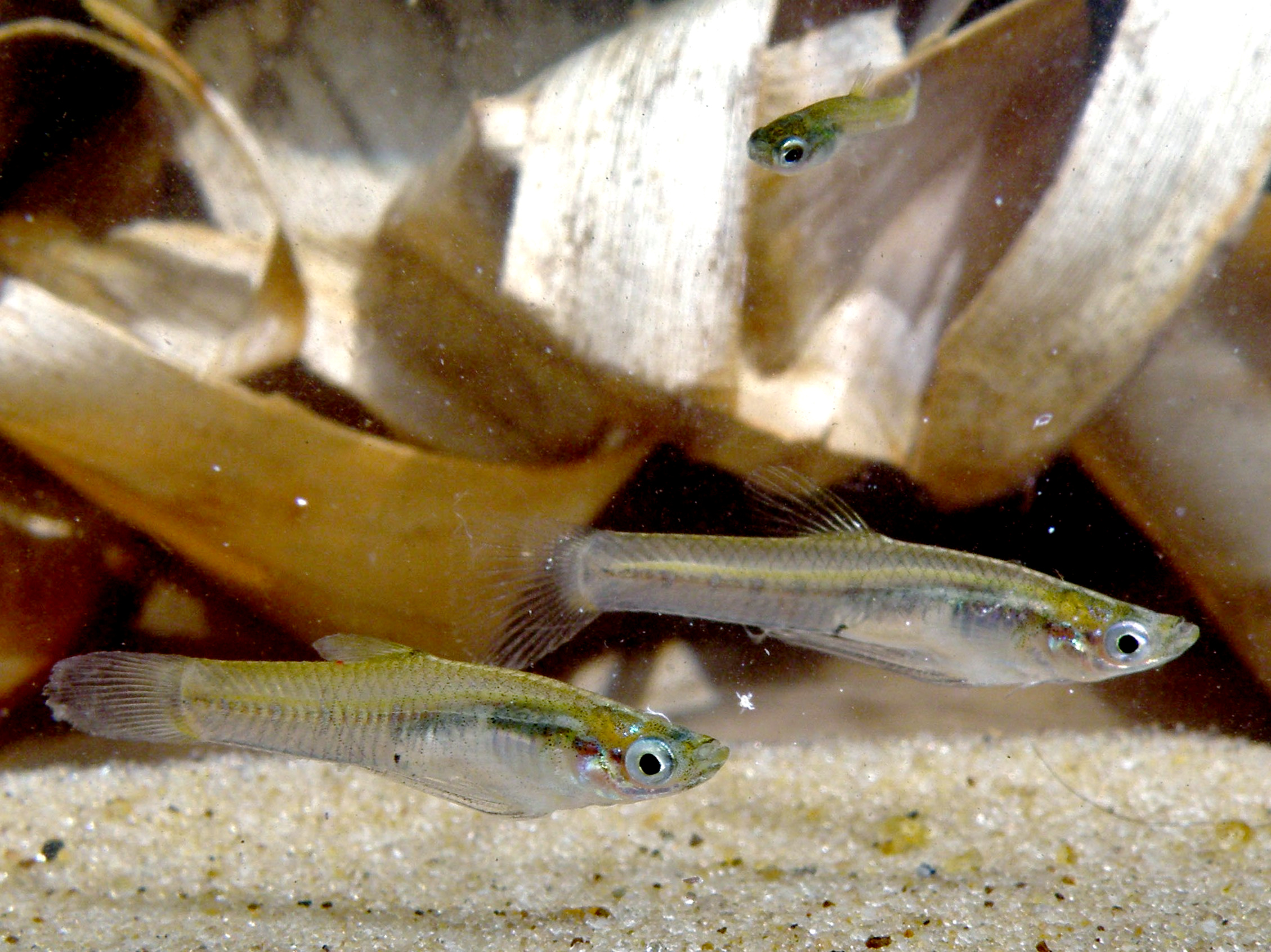
- Cnesterodon decemmaculatus

Scientific classification
- Kingdom: Animalia
- Phylum: Chordata
- Class: Actinopterygii
- Order: Cyprinodontiformes
- Family: Poeciliidae
- Subfamily: Poeciliinae
- Tribe: Cnesterodontini; Hubbs, 1924

= Cnesterodontini =

Tribe of fishes

Cnesterodontini is a tribe of fishes which are within the subfamily Poeciliinae of the family Poeciliidae. This tribe is distinguished from other tribes in the Poeciliinae by the males having five rays in the pelvic fin, there is a pedicle at the base of the third ray which joins it to the fourth ray, another pedicle at the third rays tip and a membrane there too.

== Genera ==
The following genera are included within the tribe:

- Cnesterodon Garman, 1895
- Phalloceros C. H. Eigenmann, 1907
- Phalloptychus Eigenmann, 1907
- Phallotorynus Henn, 1916
- Tomeurus Eigenmann, 1909

Other workers include only Cnestrodon, Phallotorynus and Phalloceros while putting Tomerues in its own tribe, the Tomeurini, and Phalloptychus into a new tribe called Girardinini along with the genera Girardinus, Phallichthys, Xenophallus and Poeciliopsis.
