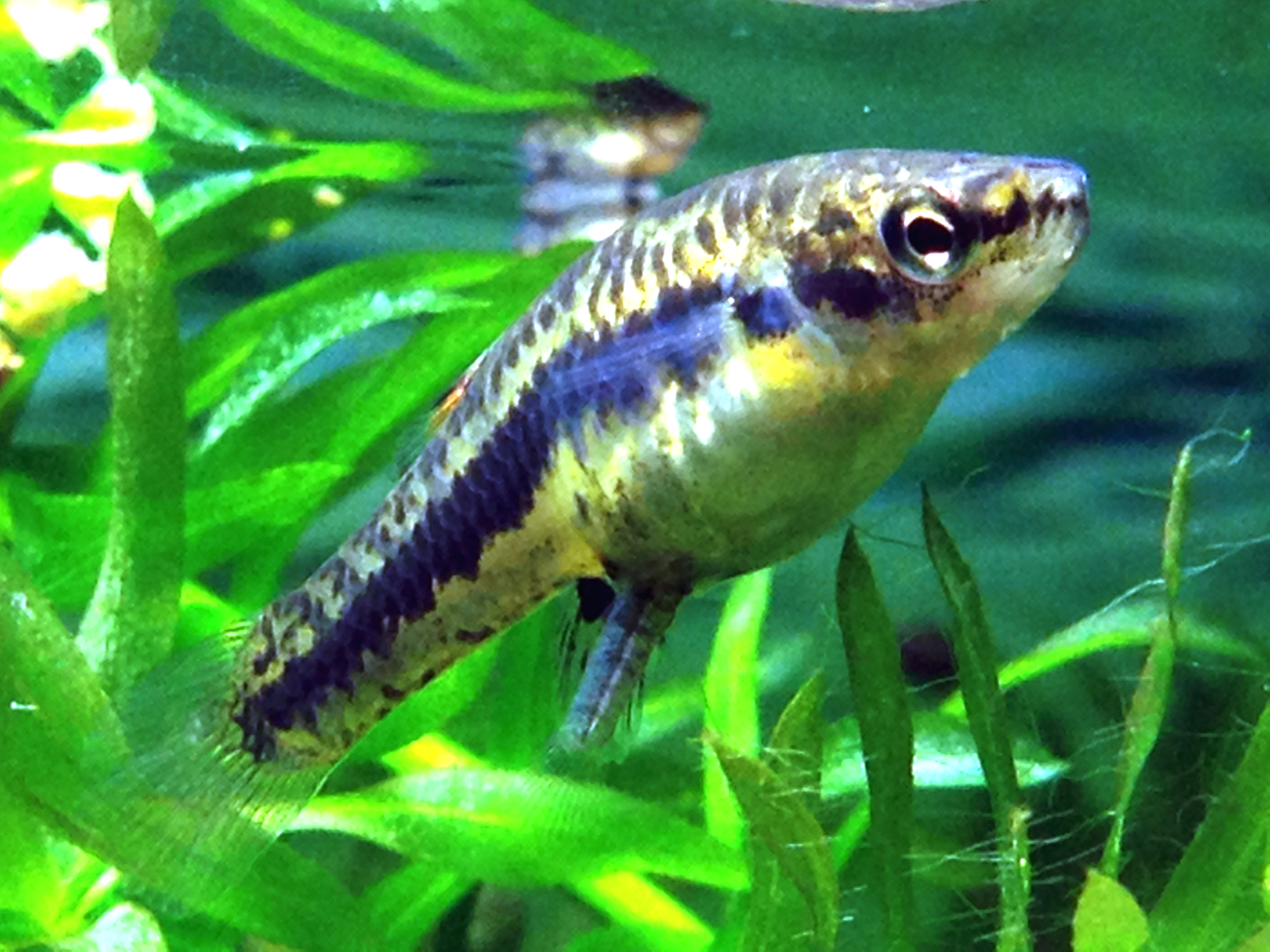
- Heterandria formosa

Scientific classification
- Kingdom: Animalia
- Phylum: Chordata
- Class: Actinopterygii
- Order: Cyprinodontiformes
- Family: Poeciliidae
- Subfamily: Poeciliinae
- Tribe: Heterandriini; Hubbs, 1924

= Heterandriini =

Tribe of fishes

The Heterandriini is a tribe of killifishes from the "livebearer" family Poeciliidae, consisting of seven genera and around 50 species. The tribe was originally delineated by Carl Leavitt Hubbs in 1924.

== Genera ==
The genera classified in this tribe are:

- Heterandria Agassiz, 1853
- Neoheterandria Henn, 1916
- Poeciliopsis Regan, 1913
- Priapichthys Regan 1913
- Pseudopoecilia Regan 1913
- Pseudoxiphophorus Bleeker, 1860
- Xenophallus Hubbs, 1924
