= Scolichthys greenwayi =

Conservation status
- Data Deficient (IUCN 3.1)

Scientific classification
- Kingdom: Animalia
- Phylum: Chordata
- Class: Actinopterygii
- Order: Cyprinodontiformes
- Family: Poeciliidae
- Genus: Scolichthys
- Species: S. greenwayi

Binomial name
- Scolichthys greenwayi Rosen, 1967

Species of freshwater fish

Scolichthys greenwayi, Greenway's toothcarp or chamá, is a species of freshwater ray-finned fish belonging to the family Poeciliidae, which includes the livebearers. This species is endemic to Guatemala.

== Taxonomy ==
Scolichthys greenwayi was first formally described in 1967 by the American ichthyologist Donn Eric Rosen with its type locality given as a headwater stream of the Río Salbá in Alta Verapaz, Guatemala. The genus Scolichthys was proposed by Rosen in 1967 and he designated this species as its type species, he also described the only other species in the genus, S. iota, in 1967. The genus Scolichthys belongs to the subfamily Poeciliinae, the livebearers, in the family Poeciliidae, which is classified within the suborder Cyprinodontoidei of the order Cyprodontiformes.

== Etymology ==
Scolichthys greenwayi is the type species of the genus Scolichthys, a name which suffixes -ichthys, meaning "fish", onto scolos, which means "thorn" or "prickle". This is an allusion to the small and slender bony appandage at the tip of the third ray of the gonopodium, which resembles a thorn. The specific name honors the ornithologist James Greenway, who supported Rosen's fieldwork in Guatemala.

== Description ==
Scolichthys greenwayi has an indistinct horizontal band along the middle of the flank and a large dark spot in to the front of the origin of the dorsal fin. The upper body has a reticulated pattern while the body below the black band has a bright blue sides with a greyish-white ventral surface. The dorsal and caudal fins are a vivid orange-yellow. This species has a maximum total length of 3.5 cm (1.4 in).

== Distribution and habitat ==
Scolichthys greenwayi is endemic to Guatemala where it is found in the drainage systems of the Chixoy and Salinas rivers, these are found in the upper drainage system of the Usumacinta River. This species occurs in small, shallow headwater streams with a muddy substrate.
