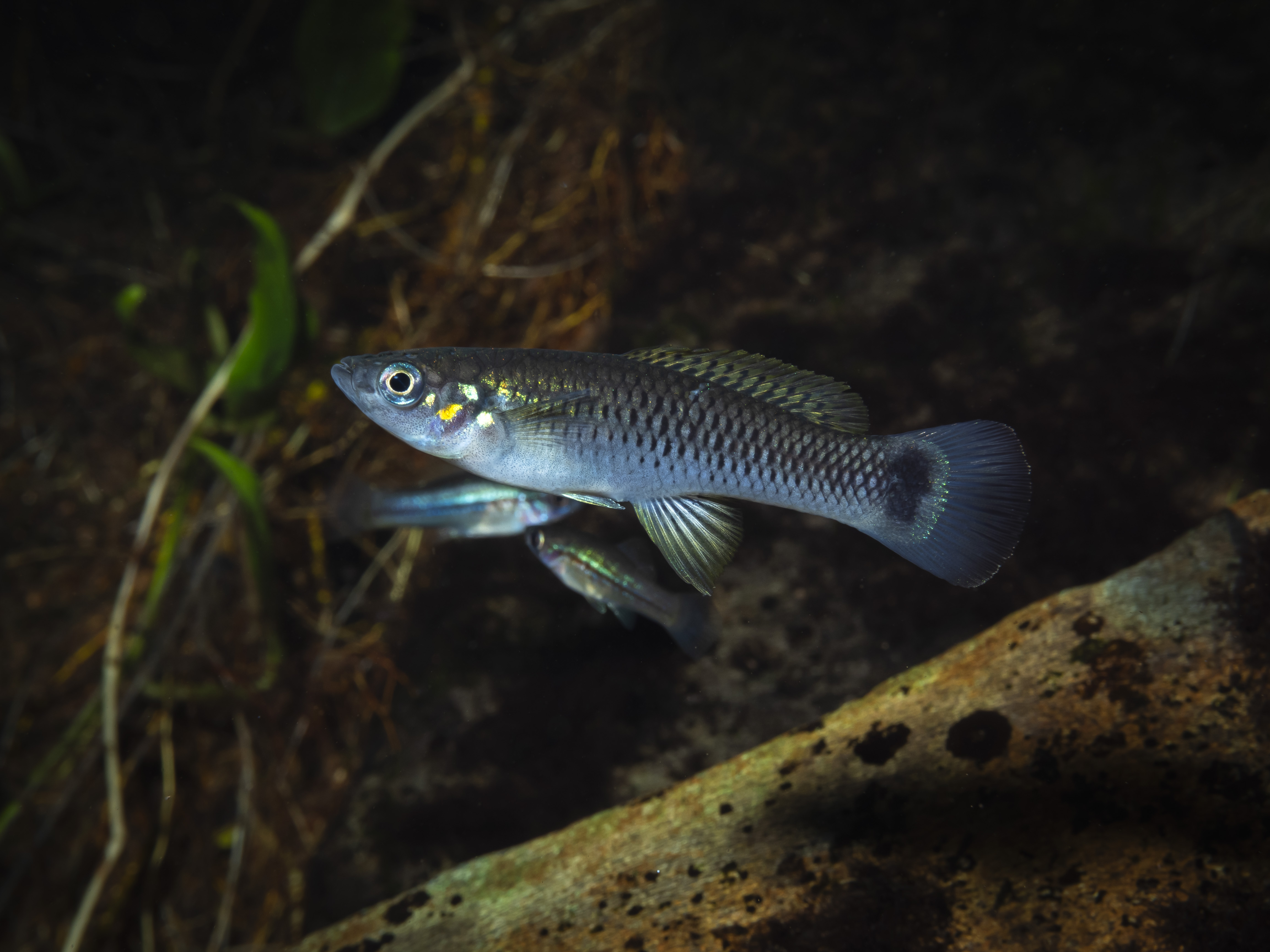
- Pseudoxiphophorus bimaculatus

Scientific classification
- Kingdom: Animalia
- Phylum: Chordata
- Class: Actinopterygii
- Order: Cyprinodontiformes
- Family: Poeciliidae
- Tribe: Heterandriini
- Genus: Pseudoxiphophorus; Bleeker, 1860

Type species
- Xiphophorus bimaculatus Heckel, 1848

Synonyms
- Poecilioides Steindachner, 1863

= Pseudoxiphophorus =

Genus of fishes

Pseudoxiphophorus is a genus of fish from the family Poeciliidae. The species in the genus were formerly considered to be in the genus Heterandria but workers found that most of the species were not closely related to the type species of that genus, Heterandria formosa, and seven species were transferred to the genus Pseudoxiphophorus. They are found in Central America.

== Species ==
The following seven species are classified as belonging to the genus:

- Pseudoxiphophorus anzuetoi (Rosen & Bailey 1979)
- Pseudoxiphophorus bimaculatus (Heckel 1848)-(Twospot livebearer)
- Pseudoxiphophorus cataractae (Rosen 1979)
- Pseudoxiphophorus diremptus (Rosen 1979)
- Pseudoxiphophorus jonesii (Günther 1874) - (Barred killifish)
- Pseudoxiphophorus litoperas (Rosen & Bailey 1979)
- Pseudoxiphophorus obliquus (Rosen 1979)
