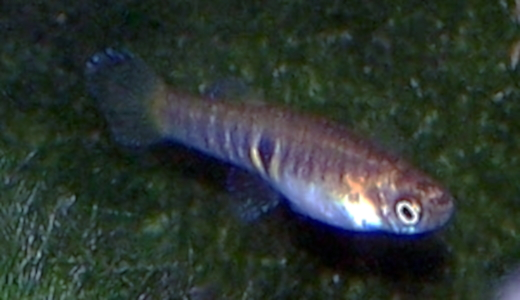

Conservation status
- Data Deficient (IUCN 3.1)

Scientific classification
- Kingdom: Animalia
- Phylum: Chordata
- Class: Actinopterygii
- Order: Cyprinodontiformes
- Family: Poeciliidae
- Genus: Neoheterandria
- Species: N. elegans

Binomial name
- Neoheterandria elegans Henn, 1916

= Neoheterandria elegans =

Species of fish

Neoheterandria elegans or Tiger Teddy is a small live-bearing fish within the family Poeciliidae. This is the same family that includes familiar aquarium fishes such as guppies and swordtails, although Neoheterandria elegans is not nearly as popular as an aquarium fish. The fish is found in the Truando River in Colombia. Males grow to 2.0 centimetres (0.79 in) and females grow to 2.5 centimetres (0.98 in). The front half of the fish is mostly silver but the rear has alternating gold and black vertical bars.

Like most poeciliids, Neoheterandria elegans is a livebearer. The male uses his modified anal fin, or gonopodium, to deliver sperm to the female. The fertilized eggs grow within the female until they hatch, and the young are released free swimming. The gonopodium of Neoheterandria elegans males has a long, bony rod that projects forward and downward. This is main distinguishing feature between fish of the genus Neoheterandria and fish of the genus Xenophallus, whose males have gonopodia that project either to the right or to the left. Unlike some male livebearer, which court the females they wish to breed with, male Neoheterandria elegans copulate by thrusting his gonopodium at the female's vent. Rather than dropping her whole brood at once, like the guppy or swordtail, the female Neoheterandria elegans generally drops between 2 and 4 fry each day for several days.

Aquarium keeping is relatively easy, but the temperature needs to remain above 23 degrees Celsius. Unlike some Poeciliids, Neoheterandria elegans tolerates soft water well. Due to their small size, they can be maintained in small tanks.
