= Cnesterodon raddai =

Scientific classification
- Kingdom: Animalia
- Phylum: Chordata
- Class: Actinopterygii
- Division: Teleostei
- Order: Cyprinodontiformes
- Family: Poeciliidae
- Genus: Cnesterodon
- Species: C. raddai

Binomial name
- Cnesterodon raddai M. K. Meyer & Etzel, 2001

Species of fish

Cnesterodon raddai, the Resistencia toothcarp, is a species of poeciliid native to the Paraguay and lower Paraná River basins.

== Length ==
This species reaches a length of 2.3 cm (0.91 in) TL.

== Etymology ==
The species name was named after zoologist and virologist Alfred C. Radda (1936–2022), of the University of Vienna, who was the first to identify this species.
