= Phalloceros pellos =

Scientific classification
- Kingdom: Animalia
- Phylum: Chordata
- Class: Actinopterygii
- Division: Teleostei
- Order: Cyprinodontiformes
- Family: Poeciliidae
- Genus: Phalloceros
- Species: P. pellos

Binomial name
- Phalloceros pellos Lucinda, 2008

Species of fish

Phalloceros pellos, the Antonina toothcarp, is a species of poeciliid fish native to Brazil.

== Distribution ==
Phalloceros pellos is found in Brazil in the small coastal drainages that flow into the Baía de Paranaguá in Paraná State, Brazil.

== Size ==
The females of this species grow to a total length of 3.3 centimetres (1.3 in), while males remain smaller at 2.4 centimetres (0.94 in). .

== Habitat ==
The fish live in tropical freshwater; and are benthopelagic.

== Etymology ==
The fish is named in Latin = Pellos means dark-colored or dusky, referring to its background color.
