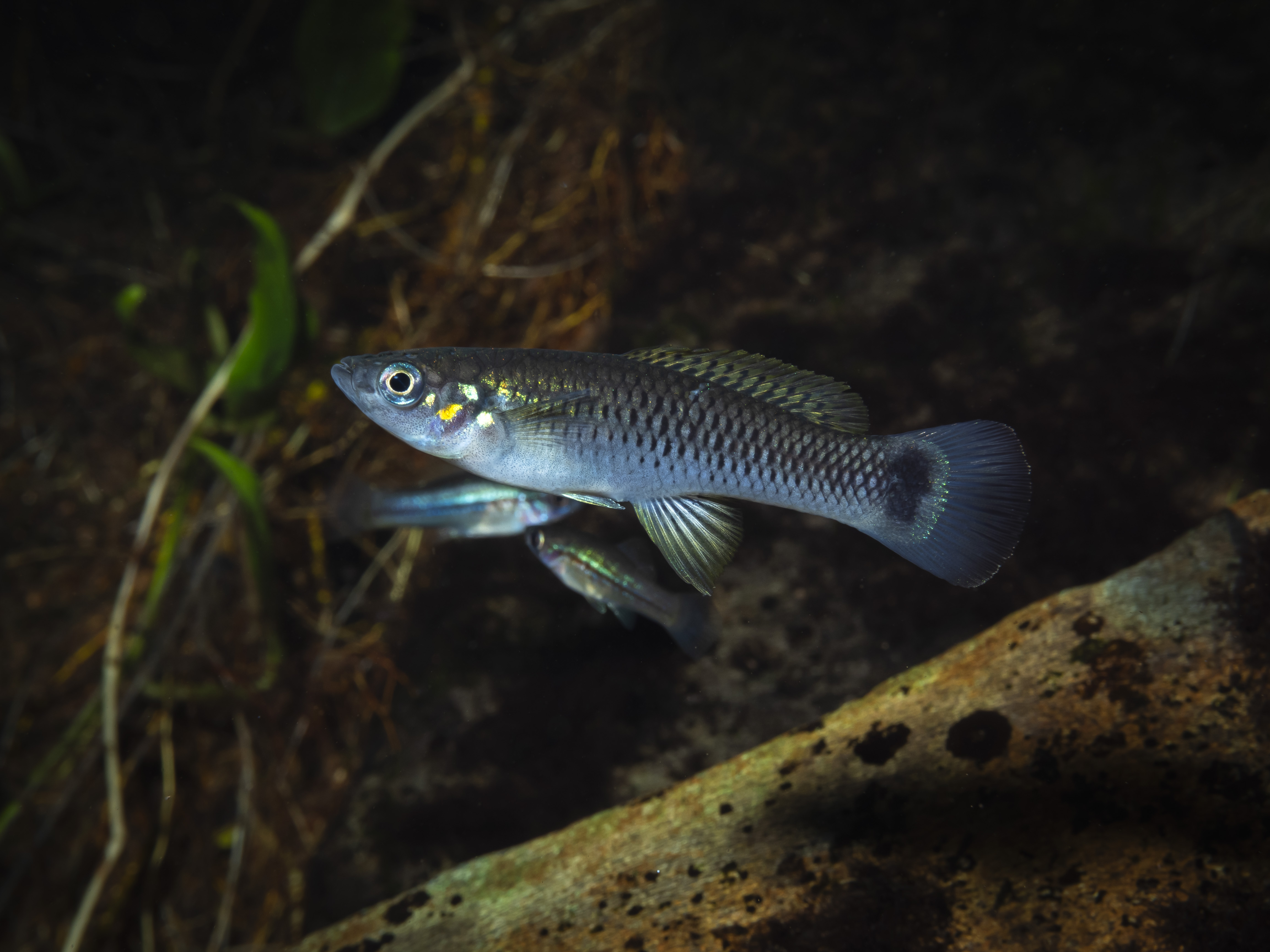

Conservation status
- Least Concern (IUCN 3.1)

Scientific classification
- Kingdom: Animalia
- Phylum: Chordata
- Class: Actinopterygii
- Division: Teleostei
- Order: Cyprinodontiformes
- Family: Poeciliidae
- Genus: Pseudoxiphophorus
- Species: P. bimaculatus

Binomial name
- Pseudoxiphophorus bimaculatus (Heckel, 1848)

= Pseudoxiphophorus bimaculatus =

Species of fish

Pseudoxiphophorus bimaculatus, the twospot livebearer, is a species of freshwater livebearing fish belonging to the Poeciliidae family. It is found in freshwater ecosystems such as lakes, springs and streams throughout Central America and Mexico. It has multiple common names and is usually referred to as the 'twospot livebearer', 'spottail killifish' as well as 'guatopote manchado' in its native regions. P. bimaculatus has been recognized as an invasive species in central and northern regions of Mexico due largely to its adaptability to a wide range of environmental conditions and reproductive traits.

== Taxonomy ==
The taxonomy of the twospot livebearer has been subject to numerous categorical changes over time. These changes have been documented within Eschmeyer's Catalog of Fish which documents the binomial nomenclature of the species. The twospot livebearer was originally referred to as Xiphophorus bimaculatus in 1848 by Austrian ichthyologist Johann Jakob Heckel, but was later accepted as Heterandria bimaculata that same year. The species was later referred to as Poeciliodes bimaculatus in 1863 by Austrian ichthyologist Franz Steindachner, Pseudoxiphophorus reticulatus in 1865 by German zoologist Franz Hermann Troschel, Pseudoxiphophorus pauciradiatus in 1904 by British ichthyologist Charles Tate Regan and has been referred to as the subspecies Pseudoxiphophorus bimaculatus peninsulae by American ichthyologist Carl Leavitt Hubbs in Fishes of the Yucatan Peninsula in 1936. It has additionally been suggested that there may be a number of genetic lineages currently labeled as Pseudoxiphophorus bimaculatus which may instead be considered as separate species, though further taxonomic research is required.

== Description ==
Pseudoxiphophorus bimaculatus is a small freshwater livebearing fish species. In terms of coloration, P. bimaculatus often have green iridescence around their operculum, hints of black and yellow on their scales and fins as well as a distinct black spot on the upper part of their caudal fins. This black spot appears to be a distinctive characteristic of the species and is present on both males and females. Unlike some other Poeciliidae species, P. bimaculatus does not possess any swordlike components or protrusions from its caudal fin. The only distinct notion of sexual dimorphism between male and female P. bimaculatus is the presence of a modified anal fin in male individuals known as a gonopodium. However, males can possess brighter colors than their female counterparts at times making them potentially more prone to predation risks. Females tend to grow larger and heavier than males with an average standard length of around 6.6 cm. However larger individuals have been observed with females reaching a total length of around 9.1 cm and weighing up to 9.96 g.

== Life history and behavior ==
=== Growth and reproduction ===
Pseudoxiphophorus bimaculatus reproduction physically occurs through the use of the male gonopodium. The species has not been known to engage in courtship displays and instead engages in rather quick reproduction attempts in which sperm is transferred from male individuals to females via gonopodial thrusts. Spawning itself occurs throughout the year but is most prevalent in the summer months and rainy season. Female P. bimaculatus have been found to produce an average of around 31 fertilized eggs, with fertility being associated with environmental conditions such as pH, the presence of dissolved solids, and the presence of vegetation as well as the size of the females themselves as larger females tend to produce more embryos. The species also exhibits iteroparity and can reproduce continuously throughout its lifetime.

Within P. bimaculatus populations, females tend to grow larger but reach sexual maturity later than their male counterparts, with females reaching sexual maturity at around 27mm and males reaching sexual maturity around 22mm. The species have been found to have a higher ratio of females to males ranging from around 2:1 females per male to 6:1. However these ratios are often a result of environmental conditions as males tend to be more vulnerable in regions with higher predation and temperatures. The sex ratios for the species have been shown to be more balanced in systems where these same risks are diminished. The species has shown that it is able to reproduce under a variety of environmental conditions which, in conjunction with its iteroparous nature and tendency to have a higher proportion of females in a population, have allowed it to thrive in ecosystems outside of its native range.

=== Diet and foraging ===
While P. bimaculatus has displayed omnivorous feeding habits in multiple systems, the species is often recognized as a carnivorous-insectivore due to the large proportion of insects, particularly terrestrial insects, present within their diet. P. bimaculatus are known to have a high degree of flexibility within their feeding behaviors and have displayed generalist as well as specialist feeding behaviors in a variety of ecosystems. As a result of these various feeding strategies, the species is able to feed at a variety of trophic levels and thus has different food web interactions depending on its environment. These strategies make P. bimaculatus a potential threat in a number of ecosystems as it can engage in adaptive feeding habits that allow it to best make use of its current environment, potentially leading to predation on and competition with native species. Foraging behavior for P. bimaculatus does appear to be influenced by the presence of other species as signs of diminished foraging has been found in P. bimaculatus housed with porthole livebearers, Poeciliopsis gracilis, another species within the Poeciliidae family.

=== Social interactions ===
Current research regarding P. bimaculatus interactions among conspecifics shows that females do show sexual preference towards specific traits in their male counterparts and can differentiate between male conspecifics. One study experimentally attached an artificial "sword" which matched the general appearance of structures found on similar Poeciliidae species like the green swordtail and found that females showed a distinct discrimination against males that featured this artificial trait and spent a far greater amount of time associated with males that lacked this "sword".

P. bimaculatus has additionally displayed social behaviors among heterospecifics. In particular, it has shown that it can effectively shoal with other fish species in its environment and will adapt its behaviors, such as foraging and feeding, depending on the heterospecifc species. P. bimaculatus has also shown a preference for shoaling in smaller groups rather than pairs or being solitary. However, P. bimaculatus has shown aggressive tendencies at times towards other species, especially when feeding, which can lead to behavioral changes in other species.

== Native distribution and habitat ==
P. bimaculatus is native to Central America as well as southern Mexico. The species has been reported as native within the countries of Belize, Guatemala, Nicaragua and Honduras. However, within Mexico the classification of the species as native and non-native or invasive varies by region, with the species being officially recognized by the IUCN Red List as native to the Mexican states of Campeche, Chiapas, Oaxaca, Quintana Roo, Tabasco, Veracruz and Yucatán. The species has additionally been reported as introduced in the Mexican states of Guerrero, Jalisco and Michoacán, but has been reported in other states such as Guanajuato, Querétaro and the farther north state of Tamaulipas.

== As an invasive species ==
Pseudoxiphophorus bimaculatus though native to southern and southeastern-Mexico has been recognized as an invasive species in central and northern Mexico due to the threats it poses to native species. The species was first recognized as an invasive species in 1997 but was introduced outside its native range and recognized as non-native prior. It is considered a significant threat to ecosystems in which it was introduced due to the many traits it possesses that facilitate rapid population growth such as its continuous reproduction and iteroparity, sex ratios and adaptability to a variety of environmental conditions. Additionally, the species has shown itself to be flexible to a variety of trophic levels which furthers its ability to survive in new environments.

Current research shows that Pseudoxiphophorus bimaculatus poses a large threat to native species through behavioral impacts due to competition pressures once it arrives in the ecosystem. A study examining the behavioral interactions between P. bimaculatus and Girardinichthys multiradiatus showed that foraging competition and feeding competition behaviors in Girardinichthys multiradiatus differed when individuals were in the presence of either conspecifics or P. bimaculatus. Those reared in conjunction with P. bimaculatus were found to show reduced foraging effort compared to those reared only facing conspesific competition and additionally displayed less aggression towards P. bimaculatus than conspecifics.
