= Phalloceros megapolos =

Scientific classification
- Kingdom: Animalia
- Phylum: Chordata
- Class: Actinopterygii
- Division: Teleostei
- Order: Cyprinodontiformes
- Family: Poeciliidae
- Genus: Phalloceros
- Species: P. megapolos

Binomial name
- Phalloceros megapolos Lucinda, 2008

Species of fish

Phalloceros megapolos, the Lindo toothcarp, is a species of poeciliid fish native to Brazil.

== Distribution ==
Phalloceros megapolos is found in the drainages of the rio São João, the rio Cubatão (Norte) and small adjacent drainages, all of which flow into the Baía de Guaratuba in Paraná State, Brazil.

== Size ==
The females of this species grow to a total length of 4.0 centimetres (1.6 in), while males remain smaller at 2.3 centimetres (0.91 in). .

== Habitat ==
The fish live in tropical freshwater; and are benthopelagic.

== Etymology ==
The fish is named in Latin = mega-, meaning large; polos, a rod, pole or an axle, referring to expanded terminal appendix of the gonopodium.
