= Cnesterodon holopteros =

Scientific classification
- Kingdom: Animalia
- Phylum: Chordata
- Class: Actinopterygii
- Division: Teleostei
- Order: Cyprinodontiformes
- Family: Poeciliidae
- Genus: Cnesterodon
- Species: C. holopteros

Binomial name
- Cnesterodon holopteros Lucinda, Litz & Recuero, 2006

Species of fish

Cnesterodon holopteros, the whole fin toothcarp, is a species of poeciliid native to the Río Uruguai drainage.
