= Cnesterodon omorgmatos =

Scientific classification
- Kingdom: Animalia
- Phylum: Chordata
- Class: Actinopterygii
- Division: Teleostei
- Order: Cyprinodontiformes
- Family: Poeciliidae
- Genus: Cnesterodon
- Species: C. omorgmatos

Binomial name
- Cnesterodon omorgmatos Lucinda & Garavello, 2001

Species of fish

Cnesterodon omorgmatos, the Cilida toothcarp, is a species of poeciliid native to the Paranapanema River basin in Brazil.

== Length ==
This species reaches a length of 3.1 cm (1.2 in) TL.
