= Phalloceros tupinamba =

Scientific classification
- Kingdom: Animalia
- Phylum: Chordata
- Class: Actinopterygii
- Division: Teleostei
- Order: Cyprinodontiformes
- Family: Poeciliidae
- Genus: Phalloceros
- Species: P. tupinamba

Binomial name
- Phalloceros tupinamba Lucinda, 2008

Species of fish

Phalloceros tupinamba, the Tupi toothcarp, is a species of poeciliid fish native to Brazil.

== Distribution ==
Phalloceros tupinamba is found in the Rio Itamambuca and the Rio Macacu drainages, which are small coastal drainages of São Paulo and Rio de Janeiro States of Brazil.

== Size ==
The females of this species grow to a total length of 4.4 centimetres (1.7 in), while males remain smaller at 2.7 centimetres (1.1 in).

== Habitat ==
The fish live in tropical freshwater; and are benthopelagic.

== Etymology ==
The fish is named for the indigenous tribe who lived in the eastern region of São Paulo State, Brazil, where this catfish lives, and in the 16th and early 17th centuries; "Tupinamba", in Tupí language, means the first or the ancient one, further reflecting its presumed basal relationship among congeners.
