= Phalloptychus iheringii =

Scientific classification
- Kingdom: Animalia
- Phylum: Chordata
- Class: Actinopterygii
- Division: Teleostei
- Order: Cyprinodontiformes
- Family: Poeciliidae
- Genus: Phalloptychus
- Species: P. iheringii

Binomial name
- Phalloptychus iheringii (Boulenger 1889)

Species of fish

Phalloptychus iheringii is found in Brazil. It is a livebearing fish in the family Poeciliidae.

== Etymology ==
It named in honor of German-Brazilian zoologist Hermann von Ihering, who collected the type specimen.
