= Phalloceros malabarbai =

Scientific classification
- Kingdom: Animalia
- Phylum: Chordata
- Class: Actinopterygii
- Division: Teleostei
- Order: Cyprinodontiformes
- Family: Poeciliidae
- Genus: Phalloceros
- Species: P. malabarbai

Binomial name
- Phalloceros malabarbai Lucinda, 2008

Species of fish

Phalloceros malabarbai, the Itapoá toothcarp, is a species of poeciliid fish native to Brazil.

== Distribution ==
Phalloceros malabarbai is known only from the type locality, which is a creek near Itapoá, in São Francisco do Sul, Santa Catarina, Brazil.

== Size ==
The females of this species grow to a total length of 3.2 centimetres (1.3 in), while males remain smaller at 2.2 centimetres (0.87 in). .

== Habitat ==
The fish live in tropical freshwater; and are benthopelagic.

== Etymology ==
The fish is named in honor of Luiz Roberto Malabarba, of the Universidade Federal do Rio Grande do Sul in Porto Alegre, Brazil, because of his numerous contributions to neotropical ichthyology.
