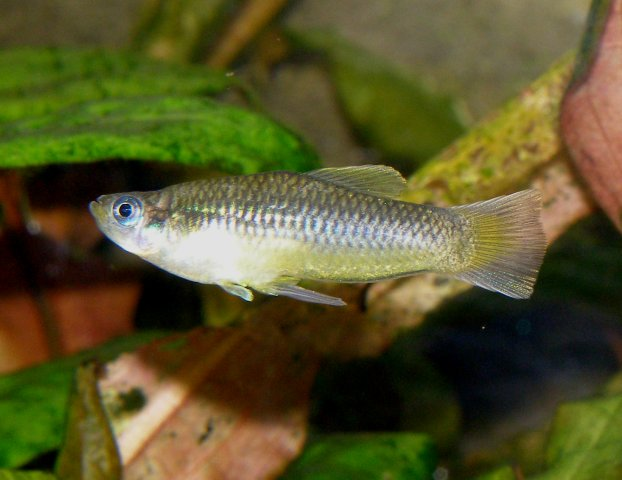
- Male

Conservation status
- Least Concern (IUCN 3.1)

Scientific classification
- Kingdom: Animalia
- Phylum: Chordata
- Class: Actinopterygii
- Order: Cyprinodontiformes
- Family: Poeciliidae
- Genus: Priapella
- Species: P. intermedia

Binomial name
- Priapella intermedia Álvarez & Carranza, 1952

= Priapella intermedia =

Species of fish

Priapella intermedia, the Isthmian priapella, is a species of freshwater fish in the family Poeciliidae. It is endemic to Mexico.

== Description ==
Priapella intermedia reaches a total length of 5.0 cm (2.0 in).
