= Phalloceros heptaktinos =

Scientific classification
- Kingdom: Animalia
- Phylum: Chordata
- Class: Actinopterygii
- Division: Teleostei
- Order: Cyprinodontiformes
- Family: Poeciliidae
- Genus: Phalloceros
- Species: P. heptaktinos

Binomial name
- Phalloceros heptaktinos Lucinda, 2008

Species of fish

Phalloceros heptaktinos, the seven ray toothcarp, is a species of poeciliid fish native to Brazil.

== Distribution ==
Phalloceros heptaktinos is known only from the tributarues of the arroio dos Ratos, in the Jacuí basin of the Rio Grande do Sul, Brazil.

== Size ==
The females of this species grow to a total length of 3.0 centimetres (1.2 in), while males remain smaller at 2.4 centimetres (0.94 in). .

== Habitat ==
The fish live in tropical freshwater; and are benthopelagic.

== Etymology ==
The fish is named in Latin = hepta-, seven; aktinos, rays, referring to number of dorsal-fin rays of the females.
