= Phalloceros mikrommatos =

Scientific classification
- Kingdom: Animalia
- Phylum: Chordata
- Class: Actinopterygii
- Division: Teleostei
- Order: Cyprinodontiformes
- Family: Poeciliidae
- Genus: Phalloceros
- Species: P. mikrommatos

Binomial name
- Phalloceros mikrommatos Lucinda, 2008

Species of fish

Phalloceros mikrommatos, the Seguro toothcarp, is a species of poeciliid fish native to Brazil.

== Distribution ==
Phalloceros mikrommatos is found in the Rio João de Tiba drainage in Bahia, Brazil.

== Size ==
The females of this species grow to a total length of 2.7 centimetres (1.1 in), while males remain smaller at 2.0 centimetres (0.79 in). .

== Habitat ==
The fish live in tropical freshwater; and are benthopelagic.

== Etymology ==
The fish is named in Latin = mikro-, meaning small; ommatus, having an eye, referring to eye-like (ocellated) lateral spot.
