= Phalloceros aspilos =

Conservation status
- Least Concern (IUCN 3.1)

Scientific classification
- Kingdom: Animalia
- Phylum: Chordata
- Class: Actinopterygii
- Division: Teleostei
- Order: Cyprinodontiformes
- Family: Poeciliidae
- Genus: Phalloceros
- Species: P. aspilos

Binomial name
- Phalloceros aspilos Lucinda, 2008

Species of fish

Phalloceros aspilos is a species of poeciliid fish native to Brazil.

== Distribution ==
Phalloceros aspilos is found in Brazil in the Rio Parati-Mirim, in Rio de Janeiro.

== Size ==
The females of this species grow to a total length of 3.8 centimetres (1.5 in), while males remain smaller at 2.4 centimetres (0.94 in).

== Habitat ==
The fish live in tropical freshwater, and are pelagic.

== Etymology ==
The fish's name is from the Greek aspilos, meaning "stainless, without spots, or spotless"; this refers to the absence of the lateral spot.
