= Phalloceros leticiae =

Scientific classification
- Kingdom: Animalia
- Phylum: Chordata
- Class: Actinopterygii
- Division: Teleostei
- Order: Cyprinodontiformes
- Family: Poeciliidae
- Genus: Phalloceros
- Species: P. leticiae

Binomial name
- Phalloceros leticiae Lucinda, 2008

Species of fish

Phalloceros leticiae, the Araguaia toothcarp, is a species of poeciliid fish native to Brazil.

== Distribution ==
Phalloceros leticiae is found in Brazil in the upper rio Araguaia, which is a main tributary to the rio Tocantins in Brazil.

== Size ==
The females of this species grow to a total length of 1.7 centimetres (0.67 in), while males remain smaller at 1.7 centimetres (0.67 in). .

== Habitat ==
The fish live in tropical freshwater; and are benthopelagic.

== Etymology ==
The fish is named in honor of Letícia M. Lucinda, Lucinda's daughter.
