= Phalloceros alessandrae =

Conservation status
- Least Concern (IUCN 3.1)

Scientific classification
- Kingdom: Animalia
- Phylum: Chordata
- Class: Actinopterygii
- Division: Teleostei
- Order: Cyprinodontiformes
- Family: Poeciliidae
- Genus: Phalloceros
- Species: P. alessandrae

Binomial name
- Phalloceros alessandrae Lucinda, 2008

Species of fish

Phalloceros alessandrae, or Alessandra's toothcarp, is a species of poeciliid fish native to Brazil.

== Distribution ==
Phalloceros alessandrae is found in Brazil in flooded areas on margins of nearby Antonina and rio Dois de Fevereiro, flowing into the Baía de Paranaguá.

== Size ==
The females of this species grow to a total length of 2.5 centimetres (0.98 in), while males remain smaller at 1.5 centimetres (0.59 in).

== Habitat ==
The fish live in tropical freshwater; and are benthopelagic.

== Etymology ==
The fish is named in honor of Lucinda's wife, Ms. Alessandra M. V. Lucinda.
