= Phalloceros spiloura =

Scientific classification
- Kingdom: Animalia
- Phylum: Chordata
- Class: Actinopterygii
- Division: Teleostei
- Order: Cyprinodontiformes
- Family: Poeciliidae
- Genus: Phalloceros
- Species: P. spiloura

Binomial name
- Phalloceros spiloura Lucinda, 2008

Species of fish

Phalloceros spiloura, the three point toothcarp, is a species of poeciliid fish native to Brazil.

== Distribution ==
Phalloceros spiloura is found in Brazil in the Rio Iguaçu and the coastal drainages of the Rio Grande do Sul and Santa Catarina, including the rio Tubarão, the rio Itajaí-Açu, the rio Itapocu, the rio Mampituba, the rio Cubatão (North), and the rio Tramandaí drainages.

== Size ==
The females of this species grow to a total length of 3.4 centimetres (1.3 in), while males remain smaller at 2.2 centimetres (0.87 in). .

== Habitat ==
The fish live in tropical freshwater; and are benthopelagic.

== Etymology ==
The fish is named in Latin = spilos, meaning spot; oura, meaning tail, referring to the rounded spot close to base of lowest caudal-fin rays.
