= Phalloceros reisi =

Scientific classification
- Kingdom: Animalia
- Phylum: Chordata
- Class: Actinopterygii
- Division: Teleostei
- Order: Cyprinodontiformes
- Family: Poeciliidae
- Genus: Phalloceros
- Species: P. reisi

Binomial name
- Phalloceros reisi Lucinda, 2008

Species of fish

Phalloceros reisi, the Apiaí toothcarp, is a species of poeciliid fish native to Brazil.

== Distribution ==
Phalloceros reisi is found in the headwaters of the rio Tietê, the rio Paraíba do Sul, the rio Ribeira de Iguape, and many small coastal drainages in São Paulo, Brazil.

== Size ==
The females of this species grow to a total length of 5.0 centimetres (2.0 in), while males remain smaller at 2.7 centimetres (1.1 in). .

== Habitat ==
The fish live in tropical freshwater; and are benthopelagic.

== Etymology ==
The fish is named in honor of Roberto E. Reis, of the Pontificia Universidade Católica do Rio Grande do Sul in Porto Alegre, Brazil, because of his many contributions to neotropical ichthyology.
