= Phalloceros buckupi =

Conservation status
- Least Concern (IUCN 3.1)

Scientific classification
- Kingdom: Animalia
- Phylum: Chordata
- Class: Actinopterygii
- Division: Teleostei
- Order: Cyprinodontiformes
- Family: Poeciliidae
- Genus: Phalloceros
- Species: P. buckupi

Binomial name
- Phalloceros buckupi Lucinda, 2008

Species of fish

Phalloceros buckupi, the Jacareí toothcarp, is a species of poeciliid fish native to Brazil.

== Distribution ==
Phalloceros buckupi is found in the Rio Jacareí drainage and neighbouring, which flows into the Baía de Paranaguá in Paraná, Brazil.

== Size ==
The females of this species grow to a total length of 3.3 centimetres (1.3 in), while males remain smaller at 2.0 centimetres (0.79 in). .

== Habitat ==
The fish live in tropical freshwater; and are benthopelagic.

== Etymology ==
The fish is named in honor of Paulo A. Buckup (b. 1959), the collector of the most specimens of this species, and for his many contributions to neotropical ichthyology.
