= Cnesterodon iguape =

Scientific classification
- Kingdom: Animalia
- Phylum: Chordata
- Class: Actinopterygii
- Division: Teleostei
- Order: Cyprinodontiformes
- Family: Poeciliidae
- Genus: Cnesterodon
- Species: C. iguape

Binomial name
- Cnesterodon iguape Lucinda 2005

Species of fish

Cnesterodon iguape, the Iporanga tooth carp, is a species of poeciliid from the upper Rio Iporanga in Brazil.

== Length ==
This species reaches a length of 2.2 cm (0.87 in) TL.
