= Phalloceros ocellatus =

Scientific classification
- Kingdom: Animalia
- Phylum: Chordata
- Class: Actinopterygii
- Division: Teleostei
- Order: Cyprinodontiformes
- Family: Poeciliidae
- Genus: Phalloceros
- Species: P. ocellatus

Binomial name
- Phalloceros ocellatus Lucinda, 2008

Species of fish

Phalloceros ocellatus, the Prado toothcarp, is a species of poeciliid fish native to Brazil.

== Distribution ==
Phalloceros ocellatus is found in the coastal drainages between Prado and Sooretama in Brazil.

== Size ==
The females of the species grow to a total length of 2.5 centimetres (0.98 in), while males remain smaller at 1.9 centimetres (0.75 in). .

== Habitat ==
The fish live in tropical freshwater; and are benthopelagic.

== Etymology ==
The fish is named in Latin = meaning with little eyes, referring to eye-like spot, the "ocellus" on sides.
