= Cnesterodon septentrionalis =

Scientific classification
- Kingdom: Animalia
- Phylum: Chordata
- Class: Actinopterygii
- Division: Teleostei
- Order: Cyprinodontiformes
- Family: Poeciliidae
- Genus: Cnesterodon
- Species: C. septentrionalis

Binomial name
- Cnesterodon septentrionalis R. de S. Rosa & W. J. E. M. Costa, 1993

Species of fish

Cnesterodon septentrionalis, is a species of poeciliid found in Brazil.

== Length ==
This species reaches a length of 3.0 cm (1.2 in) TL.
