= Phalloceros lucenorum =

Scientific classification
- Kingdom: Animalia
- Phylum: Chordata
- Class: Actinopterygii
- Division: Teleostei
- Order: Cyprinodontiformes
- Family: Poeciliidae
- Genus: Phalloceros
- Species: P. lucenorum

Binomial name
- Phalloceros lucenorum Lucinda, 2008

Species of fish

Phalloceros lucenorum, the Jaquiá toothcarp, is a species of poeciliid fish native to Brazil.

== Distribution ==
Phalloceros lucenorum is found in Brazil in the Rio Juquiá, which is a tributary to the drainage of the rio Ribeira de Iguape in São Paulo, Brazil.

== Size ==
The females of this species grow to a total length of 3.7 centimetres (1.5 in), while males remain smaller at 2.8 centimetres (1.1 in). .

== Habitat ==
The fish live in tropical freshwater; and are benthopelagic.

== Etymology ==
The fish is named in Latin = elachis, small, or short or little; –istos, meaning least, referring to small size.
