= Phalloceros leptokeras =

Scientific classification
- Kingdom: Animalia
- Phylum: Chordata
- Class: Actinopterygii
- Division: Teleostei
- Order: Cyprinodontiformes
- Family: Poeciliidae
- Genus: Phalloceros
- Species: P. leptokeras

Binomial name
- Phalloceros leptokeras Lucinda, 2008

Species of fish

Phalloceros leptokeras, the Sapucaia toothcarp, is a species of poeciliid fish native to Brazil.

== Distribution ==
Phalloceros leptokeras is found in Brazil in the middle portions of rio Paraíba do Sul drainage.

== Size ==
The females of this species grow to a total length of 3.7 centimetres (1.5 in), while males remain smaller at 2.4 centimetres (0.94 in).

== Habitat ==
The fish live in tropical freshwater, and are pelagic.

== Etymology ==
The fish is named in Latin; leptos means "narrow", and keras, "horn", refers to the large, slender sickle-like hook on the gonopodial appendix.
