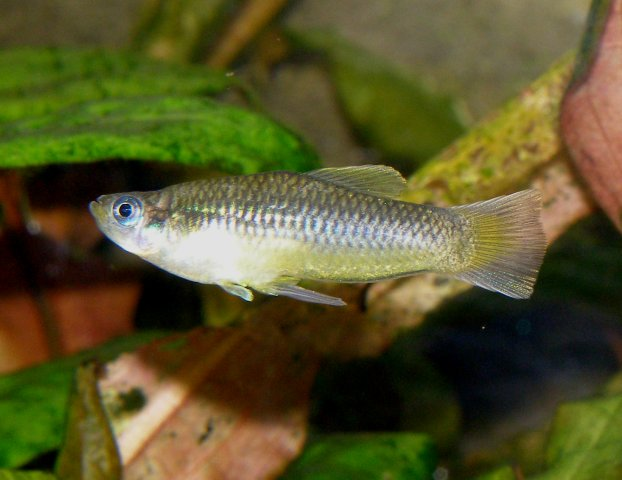
- Isthmian priapella (P. intermedia) (male)

Scientific classification
- Kingdom: Animalia
- Phylum: Chordata
- Class: Actinopterygii
- Order: Cyprinodontiformes
- Family: Poeciliidae
- Subfamily: Poeciliinae
- Tribe: Priapellini; Ghedotti, 2000
- Genus: Priapella; Regan, 1913

Type species
- Gambusia bonita Meek, 1904

= Priapella =

Genus of fishes

Priapella is a genus of poeciliid fish endemic to fresh water habitats in southern Mexico.

== Species ==
There are currently six recognized species in this genus:

- Priapella bonita (Meek, 1904) (Graceful priapella)
- Priapella chamulae Schartl, M. K. Meyer & B. Wilde, 2006
- Priapella compressa Álvarez, 1948 (Palenque priapella)
- Priapella intermedia Álvarez & Carranza, 1952 (Isthmian priapella)
- Priapella lacandonae M. K. Meyer, Schories & Schartl, 2011
- Priapella olmecae M. K. Meyer & Espinoza-Pérez, 1990 (Olmec priapella)
