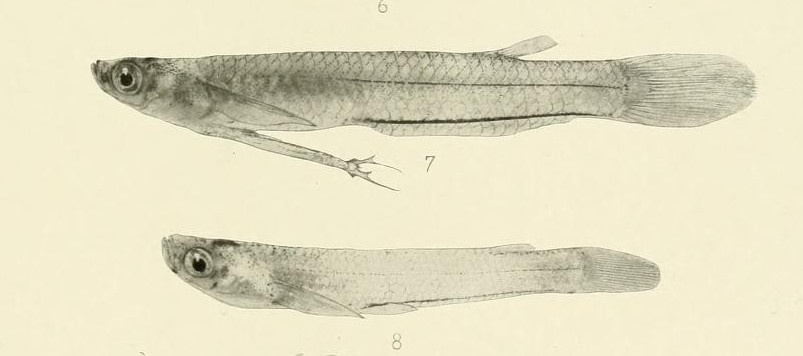

Scientific classification
- Kingdom: Animalia
- Phylum: Chordata
- Class: Actinopterygii
- Order: Cyprinodontiformes
- Family: Poeciliidae
- Subfamily: Tomeurinae; Eigenmann, 1912
- Genus: Tomeurus; C. H. Eigenmann, 1909
- Species: T. gracilis

Binomial name
- Tomeurus gracilis C. H. Eigenmann, 1909

= Tomeurus =

Genus of fishes

Tomeurus gracilis is a species of poeciliid fish native to South America, in Brazil, Surinam and Venezuela. This species grows to a length of 3.3 centimetres (1.3 in) TL. It is the only known member of its genus. This species is classified in the tribe Cnesterodontini in the 5th edition of Fishes of the World, but more recent classifications place it as the only member of the subfamily Tomeurinae, the facultative viviparous poeciliids.

This is a sociable fish which lives in small schools consisting of several dozens of fishes. It is found in muddy creeks or along the sandy-muddy edges of shallow estuaries. It has been observed remaining still just below the surface but it prefers to hide beneath aquatic plants. Fertilisation is internal and, uniquely among the Poeciliinae, the females may then lay eggs placing them individually onto aquatic plants. They can also be facultively ovoviviparous.
