= Phalloceros enneaktinos =

Scientific classification
- Kingdom: Animalia
- Phylum: Chordata
- Class: Actinopterygii
- Division: Teleostei
- Order: Cyprinodontiformes
- Family: Poeciliidae
- Genus: Phalloceros
- Species: P. enneaktinos

Binomial name
- Phalloceros enneaktinos Lucinda, 2008

Species of fish

Phalloceros enneaktinos, the nine ray toothcarp, is a species of poeciliid fish native to Brazil.

== Distribution ==
Phalloceros enneaktinos is found in Brazil and is known only from where the type localityis located in the Córrego da Toca do Boi, Rio de Janeiro, Brazil.

== Size ==
The females of this species grow to a total length of 3.6 centimetres (1.4 in), while males remain smaller at 2.4 centimetres (0.94 in). .

== Habitat ==
The fish live in tropical freshwater; and are pelagic.

== Etymology ==
The fish is named in Latin = enneas meaning nine; aktinos, rays, referring to number of the dorsal-fin rays in both sexes.
