= Phalloceros uai =

Scientific classification
- Kingdom: Animalia
- Phylum: Chordata
- Class: Actinopterygii
- Division: Teleostei
- Order: Cyprinodontiformes
- Family: Poeciliidae
- Genus: Phalloceros
- Species: P. uai

Binomial name
- Phalloceros uai Lucinda, 2008

Species of fish

Phalloceros uai, the one spot toothcarp, is a species of poeciliid fish native to Brazil.

== Distribution ==
Phalloceros uai is found in the Rio das Velhas, in the Rio São Francisco basin in Brazil.

== Size ==
The females of this species grow to a total length of 3.4 centimetres (1.3 in), while males remain smaller at 1.7 centimetres (0.67 in).

== Habitat ==
The fish live in tropical freshwater; and are benthopelagic.

== Etymology ==
The fish is an interjection usually served to express surprise, which is used by the natives of Minas Gerais, Brazil incidentally where this species occurs, as an homage to the author's birthplace, Minas Gerais,
