= Phalloceros titthos =

Scientific classification
- Kingdom: Animalia
- Phylum: Chordata
- Class: Actinopterygii
- Division: Teleostei
- Order: Cyprinodontiformes
- Family: Poeciliidae
- Genus: Phalloceros
- Species: P. titthos

Binomial name
- Phalloceros titthos Lucinda, 2008

Species of fish

Phalloceros titthos, the breast toothcarp, is a species of poeciliid fish native to Brazil.

== Distribution ==
Phalloceros titthos is found in the coastal drainages flowing into the Baia de Guaratuba and the Baia de Paranaguá in Paraná, Brazil.

== Size ==
The females of this species grow to a total length of 4.5 centimetres (1.8 in), while males remain smaller at 2.6 centimetres (1.0 in). .

== Habitat ==
The fish live in tropical freshwater; and are benthopelagic.

== Etymology ==
The fish is named in Greek for a woman's breast or animal's teat, referring to the small papillae at the mandibular symphysis of large adult females.
