= Priapella compressa =

Conservation status
- Data Deficient (IUCN 3.1)

Scientific classification
- Kingdom: Animalia
- Phylum: Chordata
- Class: Actinopterygii
- Order: Cyprinodontiformes
- Family: Poeciliidae
- Genus: Priapella
- Species: P. compressa

Binomial name
- Priapella compressa Álvarez, 1948

Species of fish

Priapella compressa, the Palenque priapella, is a species of freshwater fish within the family Poeciliidae. It is found in the Grijalva River system to the lower Usumacinta River basin in Chiapas, Mexico.

== Description ==
Males of the species reach a total length of 4.5 cm (1.8 in), while females may reach 7.0 cm (2.8 in).
