= Phalloceros elachistos =

Scientific classification
- Kingdom: Animalia
- Phylum: Chordata
- Class: Actinopterygii
- Division: Teleostei
- Order: Cyprinodontiformes
- Family: Poeciliidae
- Genus: Phalloceros
- Species: P. elachistos

Binomial name
- Phalloceros elachistos Lucinda, 2008

Species of fish

Phalloceros elachistos, the Córrego toothcarp, is a species of poeciliid fish native to Brazil.

== Distribution ==
Phalloceros elachistos is found in Brazil in the drainages of rio Doce, Santa Maria da Vitória, Jucu, and Timbuí, which are coastal drainages of Espírito Santo State of Brazil.

== Size ==
The females of this species grow to a total length of 2.8 centimetres (1.1 in), while males remain smaller at 2.0 centimetres (0.79 in). .

== Habitat ==
The fish live in tropical freshwater; and are benthopelagic.

== Etymology ==
The fish is named in Latin = elachis, small, or short or little; –istos, meaning least, referring to small size.
