= Phalloceros harpagos =

Scientific classification
- Kingdom: Animalia
- Phylum: Chordata
- Class: Actinopterygii
- Division: Teleostei
- Order: Cyprinodontiformes
- Family: Poeciliidae
- Genus: Phalloceros
- Species: P. harpagos

Binomial name
- Phalloceros harpagos Lucinda, 2008

Species of fish

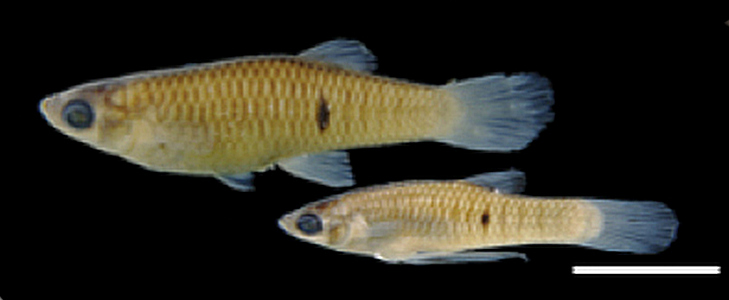
Female (top) and male Phalloceros harpagos

Phalloceros harpagos, the ellipse spot toothcarp, is a species of poeciliid fish native to Brazil.

== Distribution ==
Phalloceros harpagos is found in South America and is found in the Rio Paraná-Paraguay basin and also the coastal drainages from rio Itaboapana to the rio Araranguá.

== Size ==
The females of this species grow to a total length of 4.7 centimetres (1.9 in), while males remain smaller at 3.4 centimetres (1.3 in). .

== Habitat ==
The fish live in tropical freshwater; and are benthopelagic.

== Etymology ==
The fish is named is from Greek for hook, referring to the small and simple hook in gonopodial appendix.
