= Graceful priapella =

Conservation status
- Data Deficient (IUCN 3.1)

Scientific classification
- Kingdom: Animalia
- Phylum: Chordata
- Class: Actinopterygii
- Order: Cyprinodontiformes
- Family: Poeciliidae
- Genus: Priapella
- Species: P. bonita

Binomial name
- Priapella bonita (Meek, 1904)

Synonyms
- Gambusia bonita Meek, 1904

Species of fish

The graceful priapella (Priapella bonita), also known by its original Spanish name guayacon ojiazul, is a species of freshwater fish within the family Poeciliidae. It is considered to be data deficient. It is endemic to a small part of central Veracruz in Mexico. It has not been recorded recently and is thought most likely to be extinct, however, the IUCN states that there is an outside chance that the species clings on in a hereto unsurveyed part of its known range and so list it as Data Deficient. The American ichthyologist Seth Eugene Meek described this fish as Gambusia bonita in 1904 with the type locality given as Río Tonto at Refugio, Veracruz, Mexico. It is the type species of the genus Priapella.
