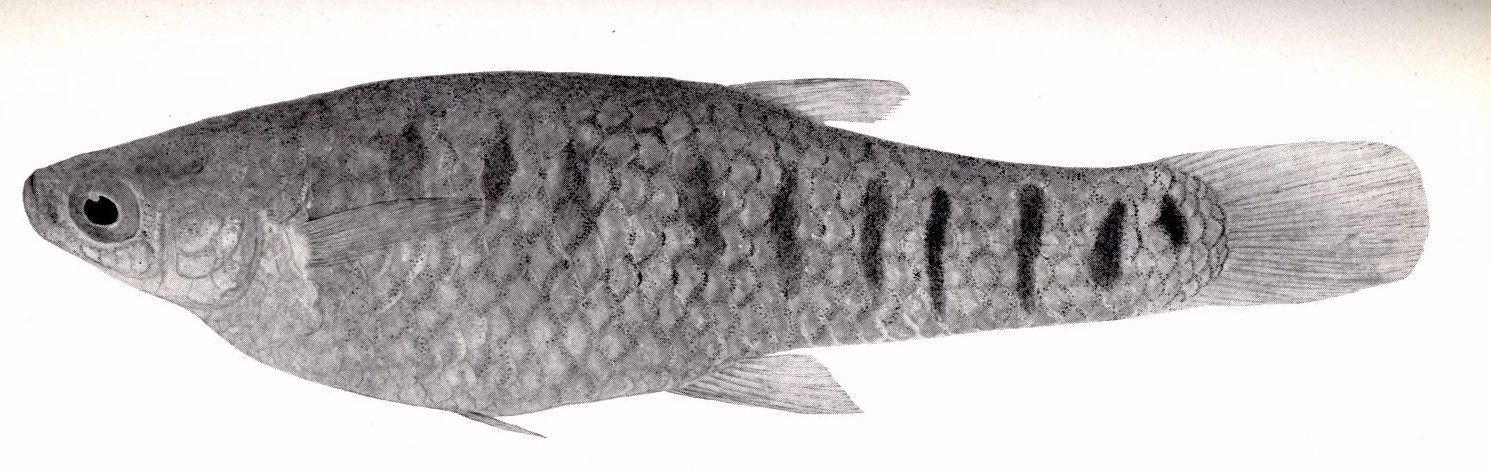
- Cnesterodon carnegiei Haseman

Conservation status
- Vulnerable (IUCN 3.1)

Scientific classification
- Kingdom: Animalia
- Phylum: Chordata
- Class: Actinopterygii
- Division: Teleostei
- Order: Cyprinodontiformes
- Family: Poeciliidae
- Genus: Cnesterodon
- Species: C. carnegiei

Binomial name
- Cnesterodon carnegiei Haseman, 1911)

= Cnesterodon carnegiei =

Species of fish

Cnesterodon carnegiei, commonly known as Carnegie's toothcarp, is a species of poeciliid native to southeastern Brazil and Uruguay.

== Etymology ==
The species name was given in honor of philanthropist Andrew Carnegie (1835–1919), whose Carnegie Museum sponsored Carl Eigenmann's 1907 expedition to central South America, during which the type specimen was collected.

== Description ==
This small species has a slender body and a pointed head. The base color is a grayish yellow, the belly is white, and the middle of the flanks show three to five black comma-shaped streaks. All the fins are colorless. Cnesterodon carnegiei attains a length of only 2.0 cm (0.79 in) in males and about 3.5 cm (1.4 in) in females.

== Reproduction ==
The males possess an angled, anterior placed gonopodium. Typical for the female is her bulging body that increases in size as the gestation progresses.

== Location ==
Cnesterodon carnegiei is found in southeastern Brazil and Uruguay. Nothing about the biotopes is known.

== Aquarium care ==
Although this species is not overly sensitive, it can be an aquarium fish that feels at home even in the smallest aquaria. The aquaria should be well planted, the water moderately agitated and a temperature of about 27 °C (81 °F). which seems to suit these fish just fine. Regular partial water changes round out their optimal care.

=== Diet ===
Diet is not a problem as long as the aquarist realizes that these fish can only manage to swallow the smallest morsels. It is advisable, therefore, to feed them only live foods such as Cyclops, Artemia and sieved pond food. As a supplement, they can be given the dry, almost dust like food usually fed to young fish. Keeping them in algae-overgrown tanks, too, has been very successful.

=== Raising young ===
Such algae covered aquarium tanks, are not always a pleasant sight, so the young fish should be raised in a separate algae covered tank and not in the parent's aquarium itself. After a 24 days gestation period, from five to ten, and rarely up to 15, young are born, each measuring 2 to 2.5 mm (0.08 to 0.10 in). Sexual maturity occurs after the third or fourth month.
