= Cnesterodon pirai =

Scientific classification
- Kingdom: Animalia
- Phylum: Chordata
- Class: Actinopterygii
- Division: Teleostei
- Order: Cyprinodontiformes
- Family: Poeciliidae
- Genus: Cnesterodon
- Species: C. pirai

Binomial name
- Cnesterodon pirai Aguilera, Mirande & Azpelicueta, 2009

Species of fish

Cnesterodon pirai, the Almeida toothcarp, is a species of poeciliid that is only know from its type locality, the arroyo Almeida, an affluent of the arroyo Cuñá-Pirú, in the Río Paraná basin, Aristóbulo del Valle, Misiones in Argentina.

== Length ==
This species reaches a length of 2.8 cm (1.1 in) TL.

== Etymology ==
The species name meaning is pirá, a Guarani word for fish and the í diminutive, referring to the small size of the fishes in this genus.
