= Phalloceros anisophallos =

Scientific classification
- Kingdom: Animalia
- Phylum: Chordata
- Class: Actinopterygii
- Division: Teleostei
- Order: Cyprinodontiformes
- Family: Poeciliidae
- Genus: Phalloceros
- Species: P. anisophallos

Binomial name
- Phalloceros anisophallos Lucinda, 2008

Species of fish

Phalloceros anisophallos, the Roque toothcarp, is a species of poeciliid fish native to Brazil.

== Distribution ==
Phalloceros anisophallos is found in Brazil in the drainages of rio Parati, rio Barra Grande, rio São Roque, rio Taquari and rio Itinguçu which are small coastal drainages of Rio de Janeiro.

== Size ==
The females of this species grow to a total length of 4.5 centimetres (1.8 in), while males remain smaller at 2.8 centimetres (1.1 in). .

== Habitat ==
The fish live in tropical freshwater; and are benthopelagic.

== Etymology ==
The fish is named in Latin anisos, of unequal or of uneven; phallos, meaning penis, and referring to the asymmetrical terminal appendix of the gonopodium.
