= Phalloceros maldonadoi =

Scientific classification
- Kingdom: Animalia
- Phylum: Chordata
- Class: Actinopterygii
- Division: Teleostei
- Order: Cyprinodontiformes
- Family: Poeciliidae
- Genus: Phalloceros
- Species: P. maldonadoi

Binomial name
- Phalloceros maldonadoi Souto-Santos, Lucinda, and Buckup, 2023

Species of fish

Phalloceros maldonadoi, is a species of poeciliid fish native to Brazil.

== Distribution ==
Phalloceros maldonadoi is found from the Tijucas, Maruim, Aririú, Cubatão do Sul, Rio da Madre, D'Una and Tubarão river basins in southern Brazil.

== Size ==
The females of this species grow to a total length of 2.8 centimetres (1.1 in), while males remain smaller at 2.0 centimetres (0.79 in).

== Habitat ==
The fish live in tropical freshwater; and are benthopelagic.

== Etymology ==
The fish is named in honor of biologist Javier Alejandro Maldonado-Ocampo (1977–2019), because of his many contributions to Neotropical ichthyology. He was killed while crossing a river in a small boat. The boat overturned and he was swept downstream.
