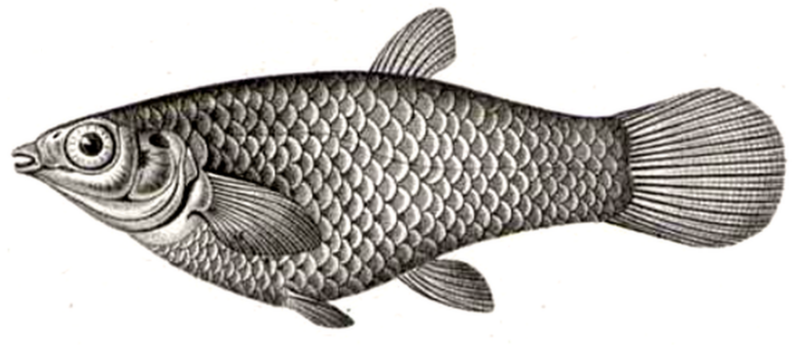
- Poecilia vivipara

Scientific classification
- Kingdom: Animalia
- Phylum: Chordata
- Class: Actinopterygii
- Order: Cyprinodontiformes
- Family: Poeciliidae
- Subfamily: Poeciliinae
- Tribe: Poeciliini; Bonaparte, 1831

= Poeciliini =

Tribe of fishes

The Poeciliini is a tribe of killifishes from the "livebearer" family Poeciliidae, consisting of six genera and just over 100 species.

== Genera ==
The genera classified in this tribe are:

- Limia Poey, 1854
- Micropoecilia Hubbs, 1926
- Pamphorichthys Regan, 1913
- Phallichthys Hubbs, 1924
- Poecilia Bloch & Schneider, 1801
- Xiphophorus Heckel, 1848
