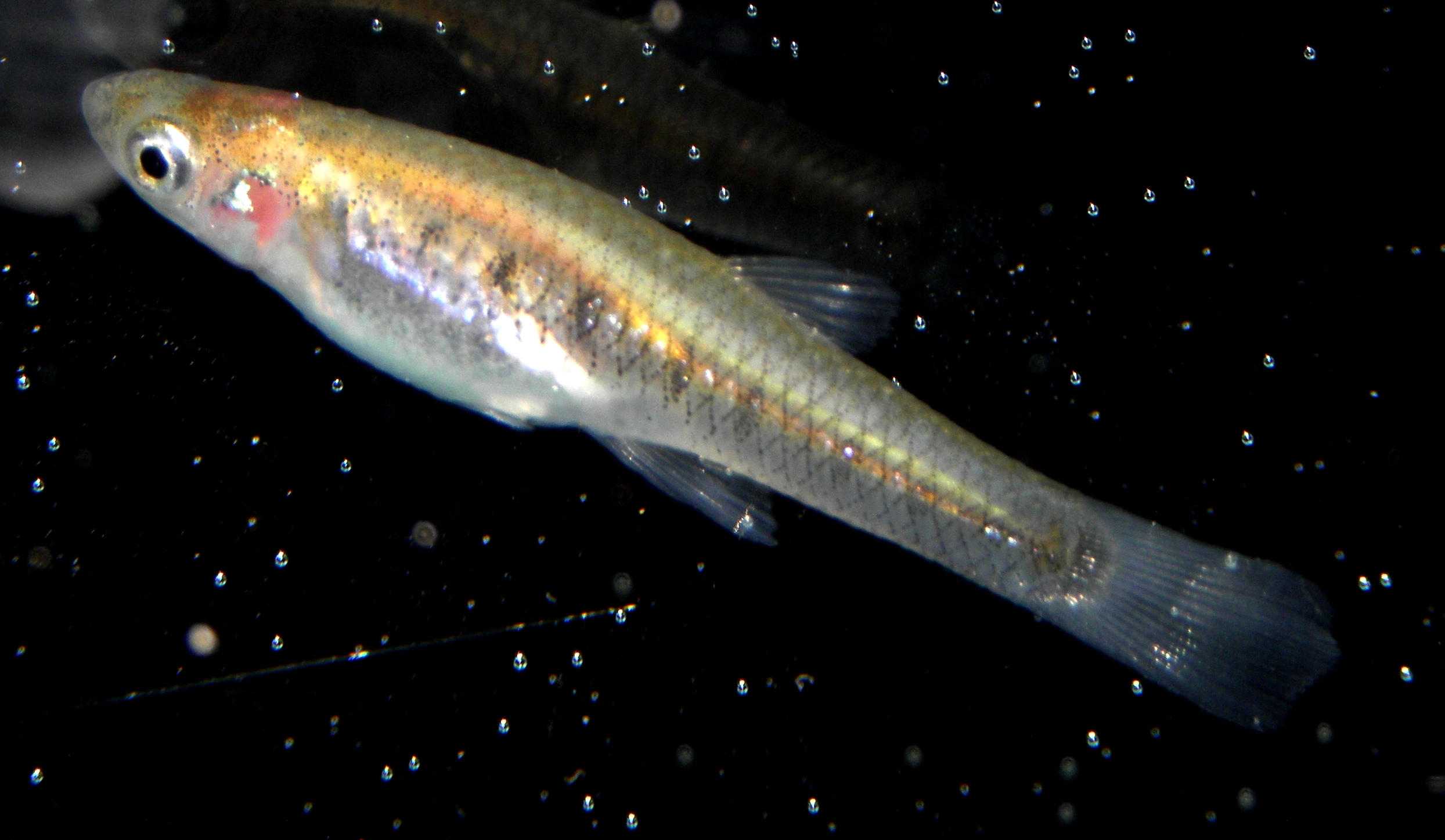
- Female

Scientific classification
- Kingdom: Animalia
- Phylum: Chordata
- Class: Actinopterygii
- Division: Teleostei
- Order: Cyprinodontiformes
- Family: Poeciliidae
- Genus: Cnesterodon
- Species: C. decemmaculatus

Binomial name
- Cnesterodon decemmaculatus (Jenyns, 1842)

Synonyms
- Poecilia decemmaculata Jenyns 1842

= Cnesterodon decemmaculatus =

Species of fish

Cnesterodon decemmaculatus, the ten spotted live-bearer, is a species of poeciliid native to Argentina and Uruguay.

== Scientific description ==
The original description by Jenyns (1843) was in "Fish" in Darwin, Charles (ed.), The Zoology of the Voyage of H.M.S. Beagle, during the years 1832-1836, London, pt. 4, 172 pp.

== Etymology ==
The species name is Latin for ten-spotted, referring to the markings on the middle of the flanks.

== Description ==
The body build is elongated, the head small and pointed. The base color is an olive to yellow. The belly is silvery. The flanks show a black band consisting of seven to eleven narrow vertical stripes. All the fins are colorless, except for some dull black edging on the dorsal and caudal fins under some conditions, which depends upon the moods of the fish.

== Reproduction ==
The males possess an angled, anterior placed gonopodium. Typical for the female is her bulging body that increases in size as the gestation progresses.

== Location ==
Cnesterodon decemmaculatus is found in Bolivia, Brazil, Paraguay, Uruguay, and Argentina, where it prefers calm waters with much aquatic vegetation, which are found in shallow streams and drainage ditches. These waters, which can be heated to 30 °C in the hottest season, is the norm.

== Aquarium care ==
This species is one that should be kept with its own kind. It does not mix well with other species, even other Cnesterodons. It can be kept in the smallest aquaria. The aquaria should be well planted, the water moderately agitated and a temperature of about 27o C. which seems to suit these fish just fine. Regular partial water changes round out their optimal care.

=== Diet ===
Diet is not a problem as long as the aquarist realizes that these fish can only manage to swallow the smallest morsels. It is advisable, therefore, to feed them only live foods such as Cyclops, Artemia and sieved pond food. As a supplement, they can be given the dry, almost dust like food usually fed to young fish. Keeping them in algae-overgrown tanks, too, has been very successful.

=== Raising young ===
Such algae covered aquarium tanks, are not always a pleasant sight, so the young fish should be raised in a separate algae covered tank and not in the parent's aquarium itself. After a 24 days gestation period, from five to ten, and rarely up to 15, young are born, each measuring 2 to 2.5 mm. Sexual maturity occurs after the third or fourth month.
