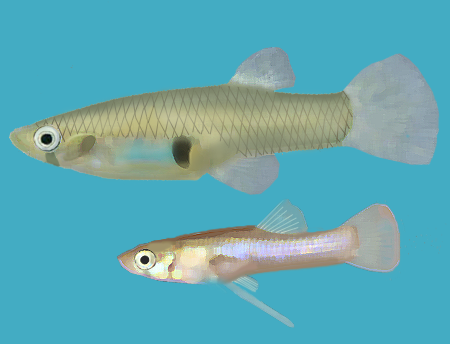
- Eastern mosquitofish Gambusia holbrooki

Scientific classification
- Kingdom: Animalia
- Phylum: Chordata
- Class: Actinopterygii
- Order: Cyprinodontiformes
- Family: Poeciliidae
- Subfamily: Poeciliinae
- Tribe: Gambusiini; Gill, 1889

= Gambusiini =

Tribe of fishes

Gambusiini, also spelled Gambusini, is a tribe of killifishes from the "livebearer" family Poeciliidae. Their native range encompasses Central and much of North America, with a single species Gambusia lemaitrei occurring in South America. Some species have been widely introduced outside their native range and the Eastern mosquitofish Gambusia holbrooki is considered to be one of the 100 worst invasive species in the world and is responsible for declines in small native aquatic species worldwide.

== Genera ==
The following general are classified in the tribe Gambusini:

- Genus Belonesox Kner, 1860
- Genus Brachyrhaphis Regan, 1913
- Genus Gambusia Poey, 1854
- Genus Heterophallus Regan, 1914
