= Scolichthys iota =

Conservation status
- Vulnerable (IUCN 3.1)

Scientific classification
- Kingdom: Animalia
- Phylum: Chordata
- Class: Actinopterygii
- Order: Cyprinodontiformes
- Family: Poeciliidae
- Genus: Scolichthys
- Species: S. iota

Binomial name
- Scolichthys iota Rosen, 1967

Species of freshwater fish

Scolichthys iota is a species of poeciliid found in the dense vegetation along the Rio Chajmaic in Alta Verapaz, Guatemala. This species reaches a length of 2.5 cm (1 in). It is found along with Xiphophorus signum.
