= Xenodexia =

Conservation status
- Data Deficient (IUCN 3.1)

Scientific classification
- Kingdom: Animalia
- Phylum: Chordata
- Class: Actinopterygii
- Order: Cyprinodontiformes
- Family: Poeciliidae
- Subfamily: Xenodexiinae; C. L. Hubbs, 1950
- Genus: Xenodexia; C. L. Hubbs, 1950
- Species: X. ctenolepis

Binomial name
- Xenodexia ctenolepis C. L. Hubbs, 1950

Genus of fishes

Xenodexia is a genus of poeciliid fish. It contains the single species Xenodexia ctenolepis, the Grijalva studfish, which is endemic to river basins in Guatemala where it lives in both slow- and fast-flowing waters. Females reach up to 4.5 cm (1.8 in) in total length and males are somewhat smaller. It is the only member of the subfamily Xenodexiinae.
