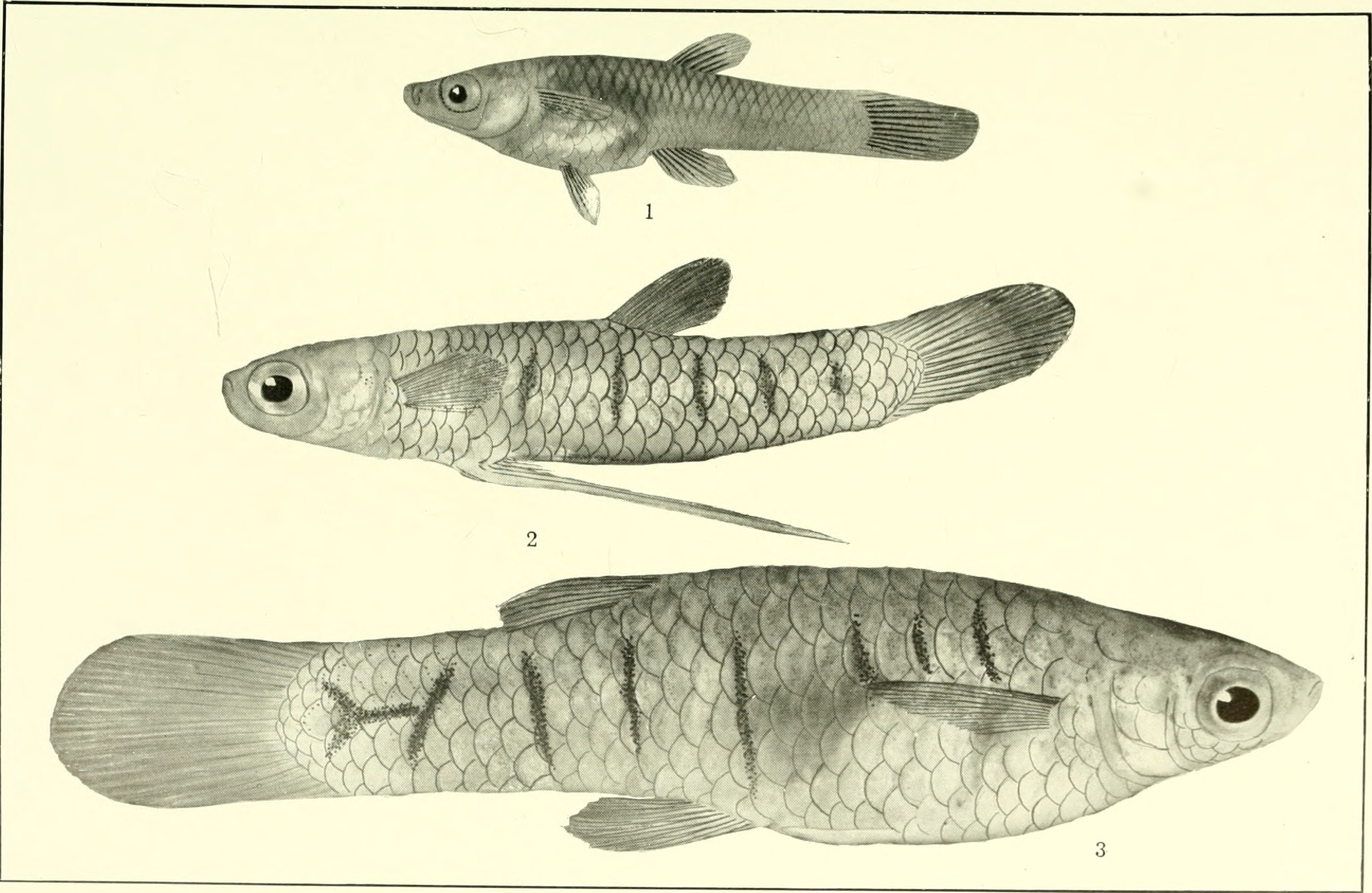
- Pamphorichthys hasemani at the top (Phalloptychus eigenmanni, middle and bottom)

Scientific classification
- Kingdom: Animalia
- Phylum: Chordata
- Class: Actinopterygii
- Order: Cyprinodontiformes
- Family: Poeciliidae
- Tribe: Poeciliini
- Genus: Pamphorichthys; Regan, 1913

Type species
- Heterandria minor Garman, 1895

= Pamphorichthys =

Genus of fishes

Pamphorichthys is a genus of poeciliids native to the Amazon, Paraguay, São Francisco and Itapicuru basins in South America.

Some authorities consider Pamphorichthys to be a subgenus of Poecilia.

== Species ==
There are currently six recognized species in this genus:

- Pamphorichthys araguaiensis W. J. E. M. Costa, 1991
- Pamphorichthys hasemani (Henn, 1916)
- Pamphorichthys hollandi (Henn, 1916)
- Pamphorichthys minor (Garman, 1895) (Mini-molly)
- Pamphorichthys pertapeh C. A. A. de Figueiredo, 2008
- Pamphorichthys scalpridens (Garman, 1895)
