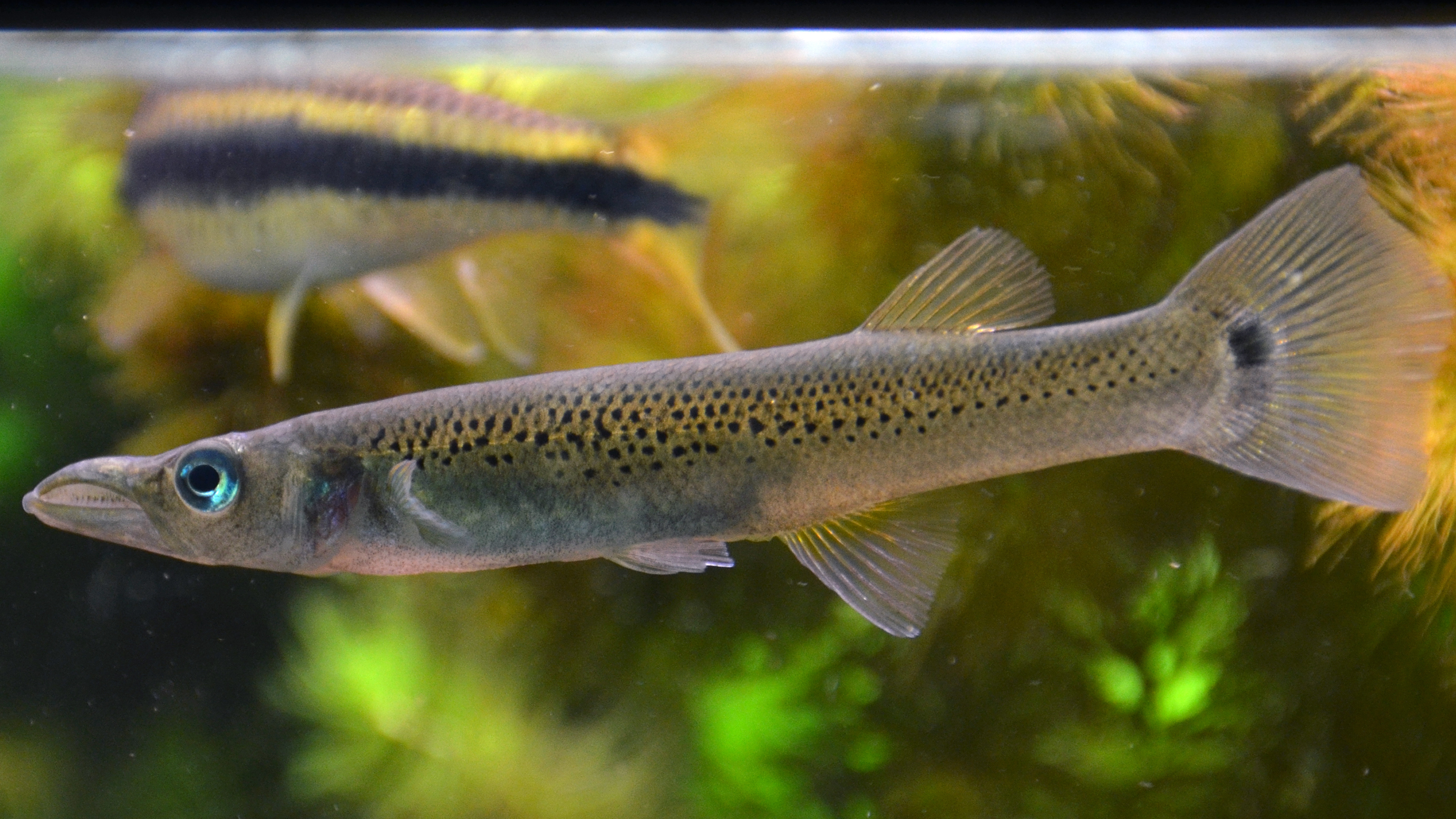

Conservation status
- Least Concern (IUCN 3.1)

Scientific classification
- Kingdom: Animalia
- Phylum: Chordata
- Class: Actinopterygii
- Order: Cyprinodontiformes
- Family: Poeciliidae
- Subfamily: Poeciliinae
- Tribe: Gambusiini
- Genus: Belonesox; Kner, 1860
- Species: B. belizanus

Binomial name
- Belonesox belizanus Kner, 1860

= Pike topminnow =

Species of fish

The pike topminnow (Belonesox belizanus), more commonly known as pike killifish and sometimes referred to as topminnow, is a species of poeciliid found from Mexico to Nicaragua. It has also been introduced to Florida, USA. It is the only known member of its genus. The pike topminnow was described in 1860 by Austrian ichthyologist Rudolf Kner, who gave the type locality as Belize, which is reflected in this species' specific name.

== Ecology ==
Unlike most poeciliids (which tend to be generalists or micropredators), this is a highly specialized predator, with an extremely flexible upper jaw that enables it to take very large prey items for its size.

== Description ==
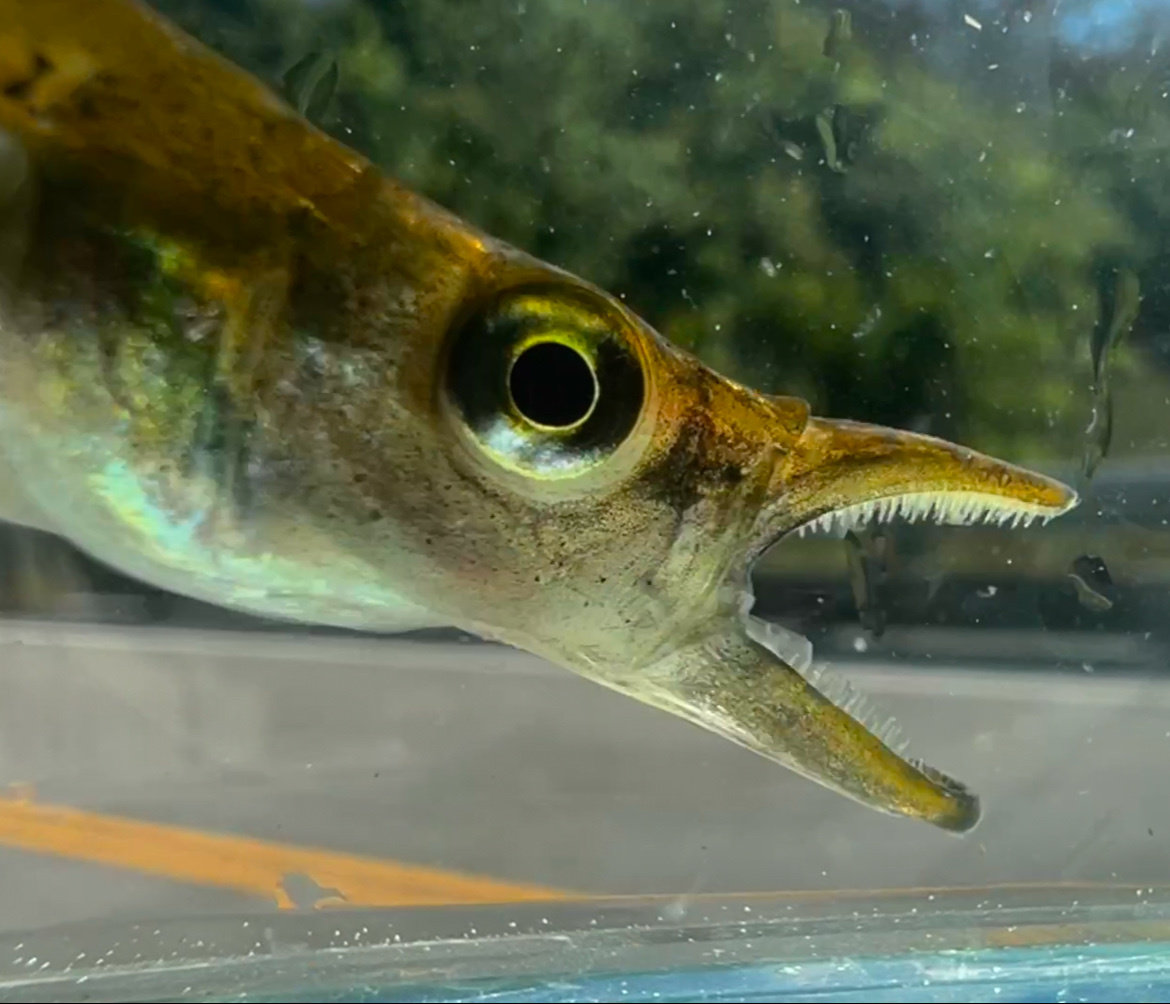
Jaws close up

It grows typically to 9.7 cm (3.8 in) total length, exceptionally to 20 cm (7.9 in). It has an elongated appearance with a flat back profile. The lower jaw is longer than the upper, and upturned. The pike topminnow has large eyes and a dorsal fin set far back on the body. It is a light, olive/brown color with light green iridescence and small black spots on the flanks. The belly is a lighter yellowish white. A dark spot is at the base of the caudal fin. They are also a livebearing fish.

== In the aquarium ==
This fish can be found in the aquarium trade, but is not an easy aquarium resident, especially by poeciliid standards.
