= Scolichthys =

Scientific classification
- Kingdom: Animalia
- Phylum: Chordata
- Class: Actinopterygii
- Order: Cyprinodontiformes
- Family: Poeciliidae
- Subfamily: Poeciliinae
- Tribe: Scolichthyini; Rosen, 1967
- Genus: Scolichthys; Rosen, 1967

Type species
- Scolichthys greenwayi Rosen, 1967

Genus of fishes

Scolichthys is a genus of poeciliid fishes endemic to river basins in Guatemala.

== Species ==
There are currently two recognized species in this genus:

- Scolichthys greenwayi Rosen, 1967
- Scolichthys iota Rosen, 1967
