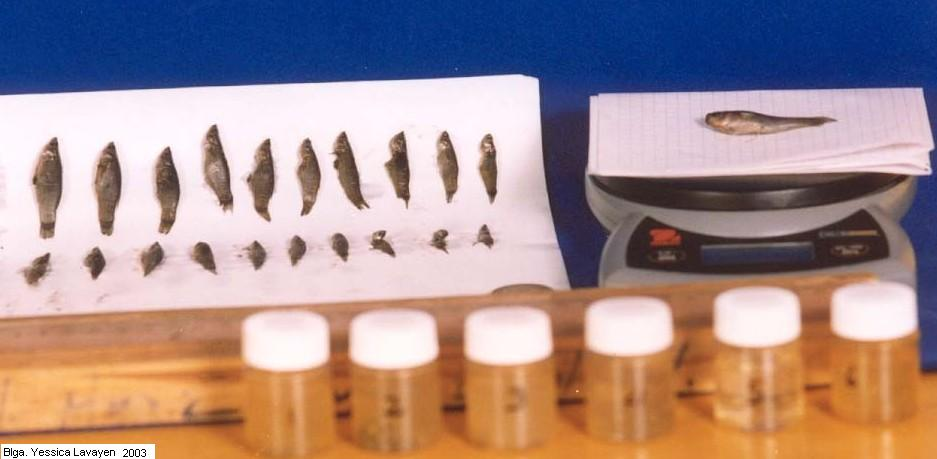
- Pseudopoecilia fria, specimens

Scientific classification
- Kingdom: Animalia
- Phylum: Chordata
- Class: Actinopterygii
- Order: Cyprinodontiformes
- Family: Poeciliidae
- Tribe: Heterandriini
- Genus: Pseudopoecilia; Regan, 1913

Type species
- Poecilia festae Boulenger, 1898

= Pseudopoecilia =

Genus of fishes

Pseudopoecilia is a genus of small poeciliid fishes native to rivers, streams, springs, ponds and pools in the Chocó-Tumbes region in southwestern Colombia, western Ecuador and northwestern Peru.

== Species ==
There are currently three recognized species in this genus:

- Pseudopoecilia austrocolumbiana Radda, 1987
- Pseudopoecilia festae (Boulenger, 1898)
- Pseudopoecilia fria (C. H. Eigenmann & Henn, 1914)
