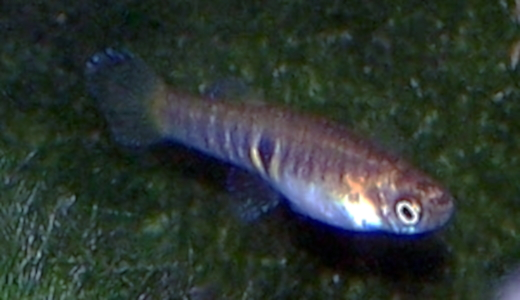
- N. elegans

Scientific classification
- Kingdom: Animalia
- Phylum: Chordata
- Class: Actinopterygii
- Order: Cyprinodontiformes
- Family: Poeciliidae
- Tribe: Heterandriini
- Genus: Neoheterandria; Henn, 1916

Type species
- Neoheterandria elegans Henn, 1916

= Neoheterandria =

Genus of fishes

Neoheterandria is a genus of poeciliids native to Panama and Colombia.

== Species ==
There are currently three recognized species in this genus:

- Neoheterandria cana (Meek & Hildebrand, 1913)
- Neoheterandria elegans Henn, 1916
- Neoheterandria tridentiger (Garman, 1895)
