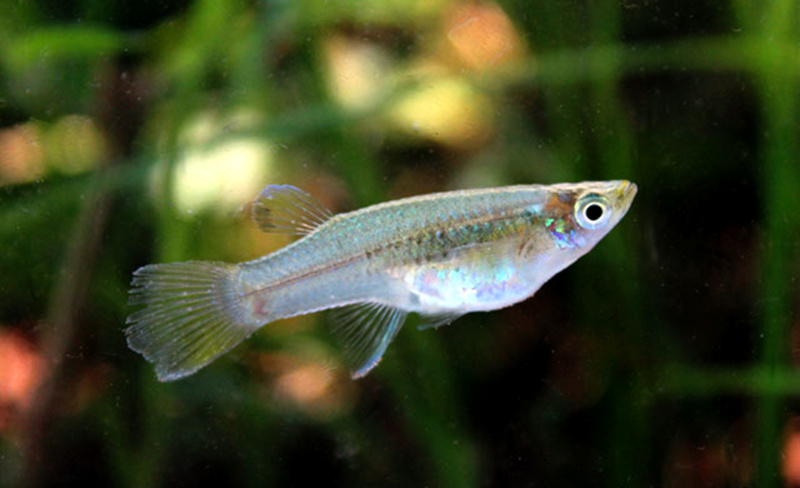
- Heterophallus milleri

Scientific classification
- Kingdom: Animalia
- Phylum: Chordata
- Class: Actinopterygii
- Order: Cyprinodontiformes
- Family: Poeciliidae
- Tribe: Gambusiini
- Genus: Heterophallus; Regan, 1914

Type species
- Heterophallus rachovii Regan, 1914

= Heterophallus =

Genus of fishes

Heterophallus is a genus of small poeciliids found near the coast in calm waters of river basins in southeastern Mexico.

== Species ==
There are currently two or three recognized species in this genus:

- Heterophallus echeagarayi (Álvarez, 1952) (Maya gambusia)
- Heterophallus milleri Radda, 1987 (Grijalva gambusia)
- Heterophallus rachovii Regan, 1914 (Coatzacoalcos gambusia)

FishBase places Heterophallus echeagarayi in the genus Gambusia.
