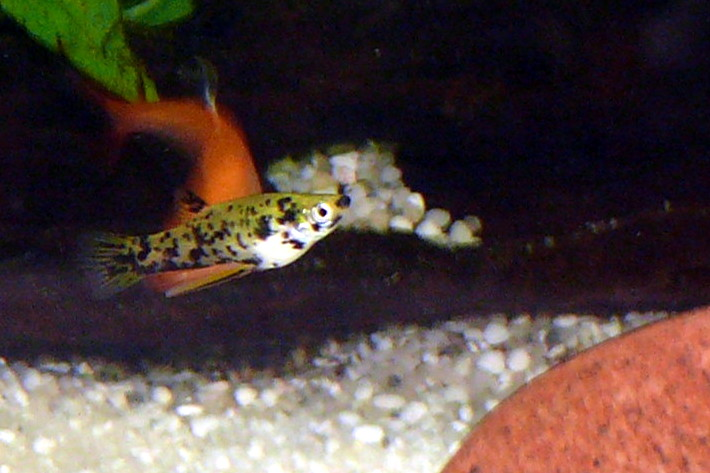
- Dusky millions fish (P. caudimaculatus)

Scientific classification
- Kingdom: Animalia
- Phylum: Chordata
- Class: Actinopterygii
- Division: Teleostei
- Order: Cyprinodontiformes
- Family: Poeciliidae
- Tribe: Cnesterodontini
- Genus: Phalloceros; C. H. Eigenmann, 1907

Type species
- Girardinus caudimaculatus Hensel, 1868

= Phalloceros =

Genus of fishes

Phalloceros is a genus of poeciliids native to freshwater habitats in Brazil, Paraguay, Uruguay and northern Argentina. The majority are endemic to southern and southeastern Brazil (only exceptions are P. caudimaculatus, P. harpagos and P. leticiae). P. caudimaculatus has long been part of the aquarium industry and has been introduced to countries far from its native range.

== Species ==
There are currently 22 recognized species in this genus:

- Phalloceros alessandrae Lucinda, 2008
- Phalloceros anisophallos Lucinda, 2008
- Phalloceros aspilos Lucinda, 2008
- Phalloceros buckupi Lucinda, 2008
- Phalloceros caudimaculatus (R. F. Hensel, 1868) (Dusky millions fish)
- Phalloceros elachistos Lucinda, 2008
- Phalloceros enneaktinos Lucinda, 2008
- Phalloceros harpagos Lucinda, 2008
- Phalloceros heptaktinos Lucinda, 2008
- Phalloceros leptokeras Lucinda, 2008
- Phalloceros leticiae Lucinda, 2008
- Phalloceros lucenorum Lucinda, 2008
- Phalloceros malabarbai Lucinda, 2008
- Phalloceros maldonadoi Souto-Santos, Lucinda, and Buckup, 2013 - Itapoá toothcarp
- Phalloceros megapolos Lucinda, 2008
- Phalloceros mikrommatos Lucinda, 2008
- Phalloceros ocellatus Lucinda, 2008
- Phalloceros pellos Lucinda, 2008
- Phalloceros reisi Lucinda, 2008
- Phalloceros spiloura Lucinda, 2008
- Phalloceros titthos Lucinda, 2008
- Phalloceros tupinamba Lucinda, 2008
- Phalloceros uai Lucinda, 2008
