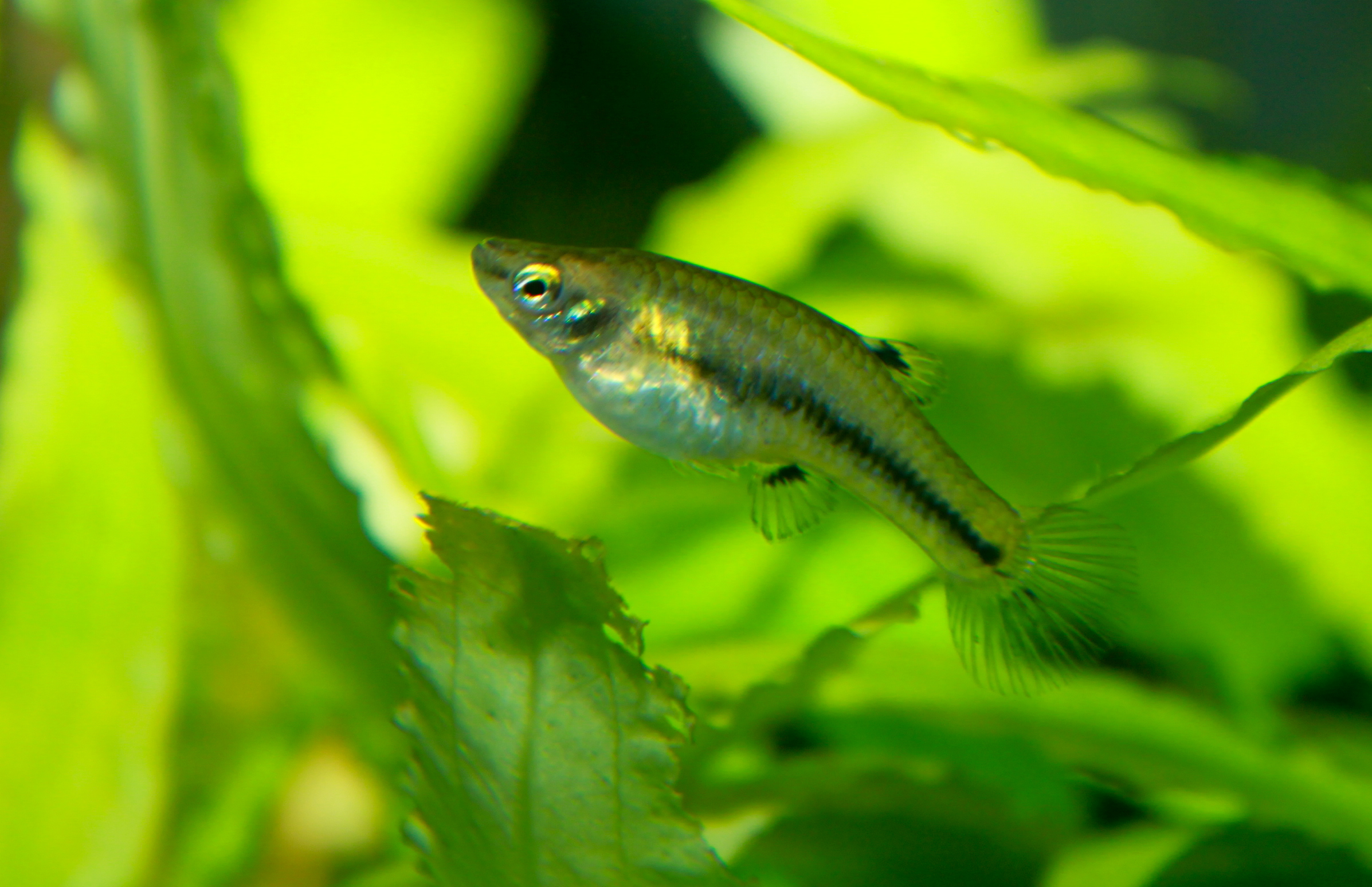
- Adult female

Conservation status
- Least Concern (IUCN 3.1)

Scientific classification
- Kingdom: Animalia
- Phylum: Chordata
- Class: Actinopterygii
- Division: Teleostei
- Order: Cyprinodontiformes
- Family: Poeciliidae
- Genus: Heterandria
- Species: H. formosa

Binomial name
- Heterandria formosa Girard, 1859

= Heterandria formosa =

Species of fish

Heterandria formosa (known as the least killifish, dwarf topminnow, mosqu or midget livebearer) is a species of livebearing fish within the family Poeciliidae. This is the same family that includes familiar aquarium fishes such as guppies and mollies. Heterandria formosa is not as commonly kept in aquaria as these species. Despite the common name "least killifish", it belongs to the family Poeciliidae and not to one of the killifish families. H. formosa is one of the smallest fish species; the 1991 Baensch Aquarium Atlas listed it as the seventh smallest fish in the world, and as of 2006 it remains the smallest fish species found in North America.

== Range and habitat ==
Heterandria formosa is the only member of its genus found in the United States. Its geographical range spans the southeastern United States, from North Carolina south to Georgia and Florida, and westward across the Florida Gulf Coast to Louisiana. In recent years, this species has been collected in eastern Texas. It is recorded to occur along the western portion of the Sabine River basin, according to North American Native Fishes (NANFA). It has also been collected as far west as Humble, TX in small sand pit ponds after the 2017 floods associated with Hurricane Harvey. It is one of the few aquarium fishes that is endemic to North America.

Heterandria formosa live primarily in vegetated, slow moving or standing freshwater habitats, but this species also occurs in brackish waters.

== Description ==
Heterandria formosa is one of the smallest fish and smallest vertebrates known to science. Males grow to about 2 centimeters (0.8 inches), while females grow a little larger, to about 3 centimeters (1.2 inches).

The fish is generally an olive color, with a dark horizontal stripe through the center of the body. There is also a dark spot on the dorsal fin and females also have a dark spot on their anal fin. Like most poeciliids, male anal fins are modified into a gonopodium (intromittent organ) that is used to deliver sperm and impregnate females during mating.

== Diet ==
Heterandria formosa primarily eats aquatic invertebrates such as worms and crustaceans. They also eat plant matter.

== Breeding ==
Like most poeciliids, H. formosa is a livebearer. The male uses his modified anal fin, or gonopodium, to deliver sperm to the female. The fertilized eggs grow within the female until they hatch, and the free-swimming young are released into the water. Heterandria formosa has an uncommon breeding strategy even among livebearers: rather than all of the young being released at once, as many as 40 fry are released over a 10- to 14-day period, but occasionally over a longer period.

== Inbreeding depression ==
The effect of inbreeding on reproductive behavior was studied in H. formosa in at least one published work. One generation of full-sib mating was found to decrease reproductive performance and likely reproductive success of male progeny. Other traits that displayed inbreeding depression were offspring viability and maturation time of both males and females.
