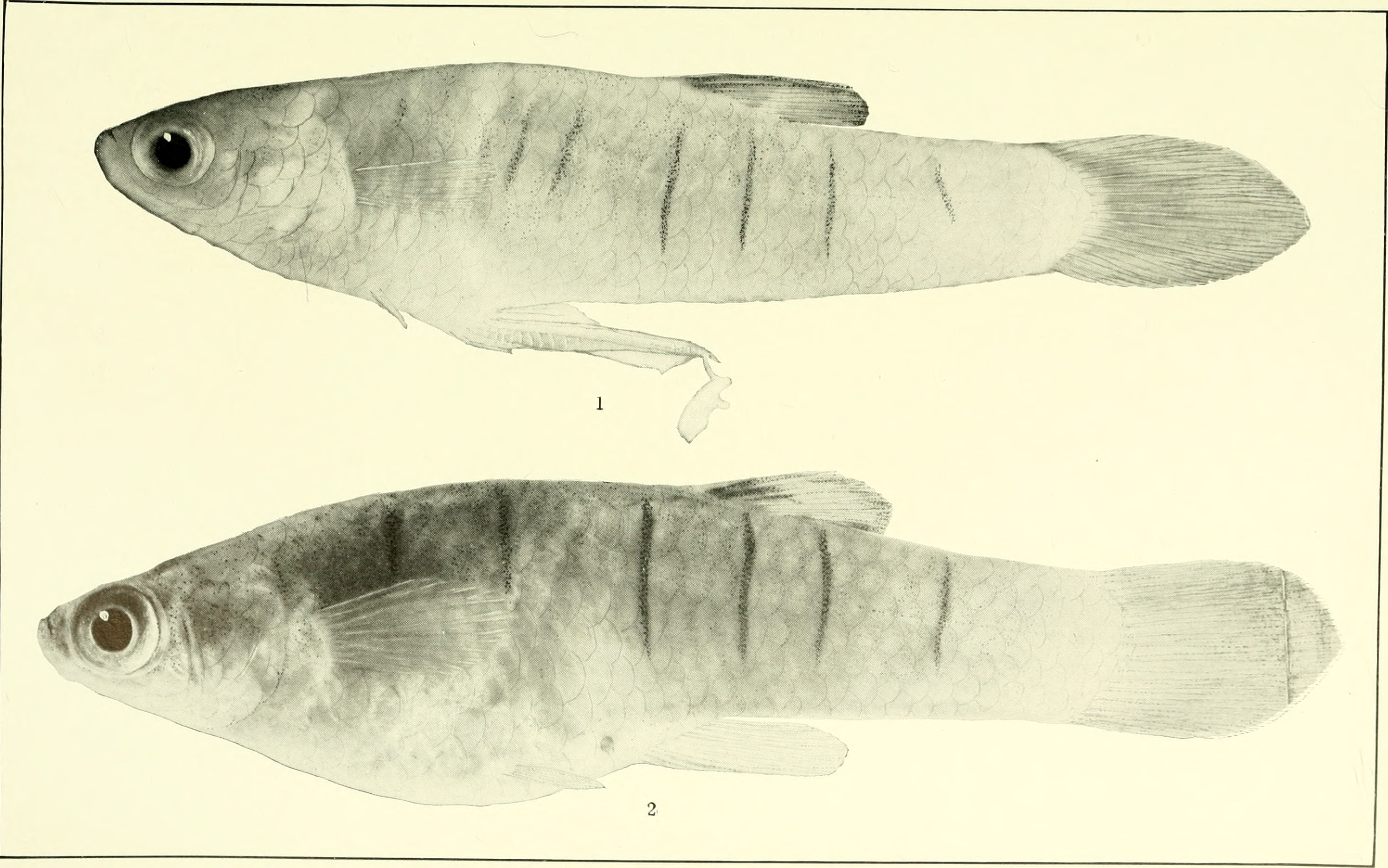
- Phallotorynus fasciolatus (male above, female below)

Scientific classification
- Kingdom: Animalia
- Phylum: Chordata
- Class: Actinopterygii
- Order: Cyprinodontiformes
- Family: Poeciliidae
- Tribe: Cnesterodontini
- Genus: Phallotorynus; Henn, 1916

Type species
- Phallotorynus fasciolatus Henn, 1916

= Phallotorynus =

Genus of fishes

Phallotorynus is a genus of poeciliid toothcarps native to southern Brazil, northern Argentina, and Paraguay.

== Species ==
There are currently six recognized species in this genus:

- Phallotorynus dispilos Lucinda, R. de S. Rosa & R. E. dos Reis, 2005 (Two spot toothcarp)
- Phallotorynus fasciolatus Henn, 1916 (Thinstriped toothcarp)
- Phallotorynus jucundus R. Ihering (pt), 1930 (Antler toothcarp)
- Phallotorynus pankalos Lucinda, R. de S. Rosa & R. E. dos Reis, 2005 (Bellyspotted toothcarp)
- Phallotorynus psittakos Lucinda, R. de S. Rosa & R. E. dos Reis, 2005 (Clementina toothcarp)
- Phallotorynus victoriae Oliveros, 1983 (Argentinian toothcarp)
