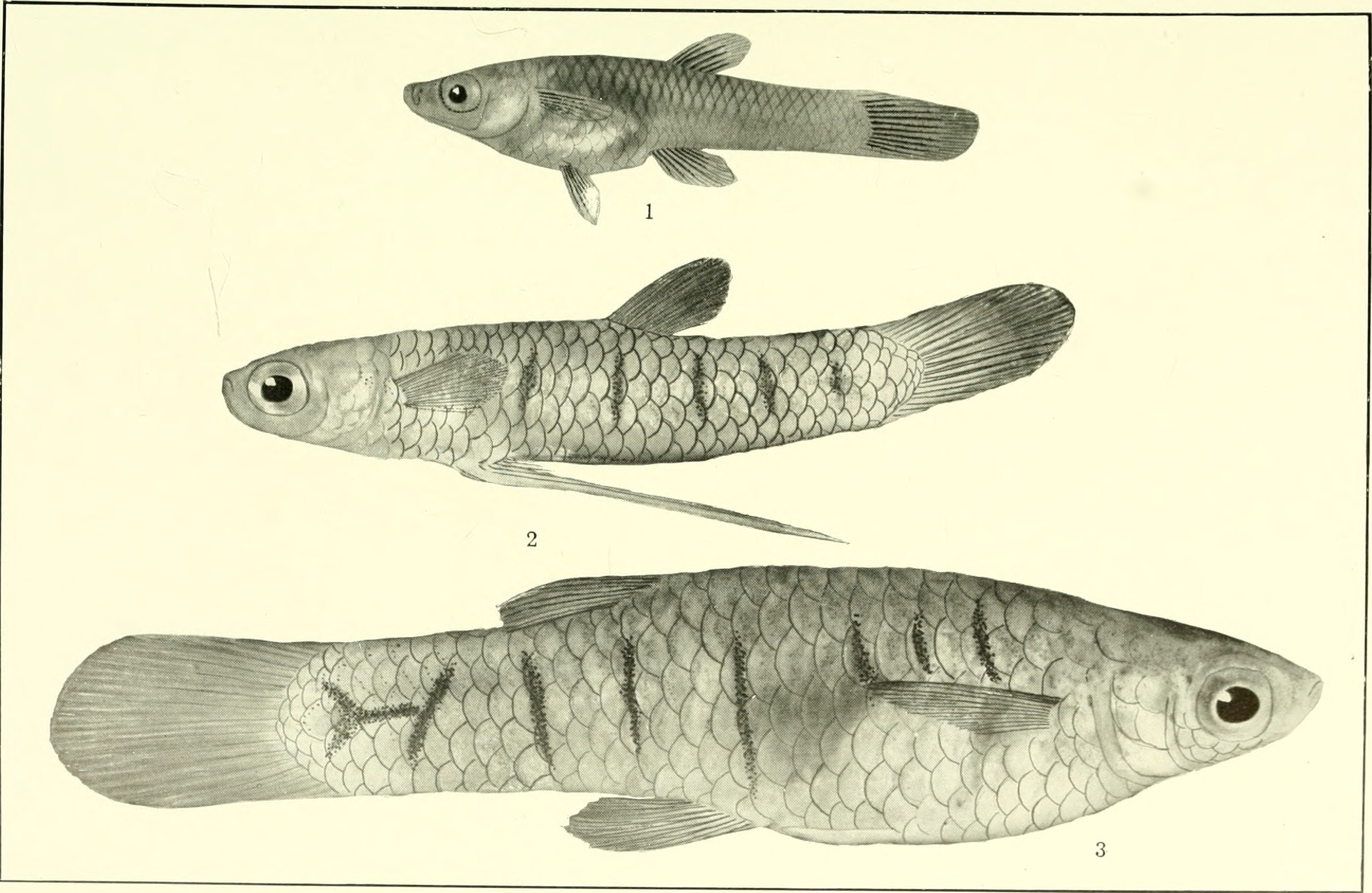
- Phalloptychus eigenmanni, male in middle, female at bottom (Pamphorichthys hasemani, top)
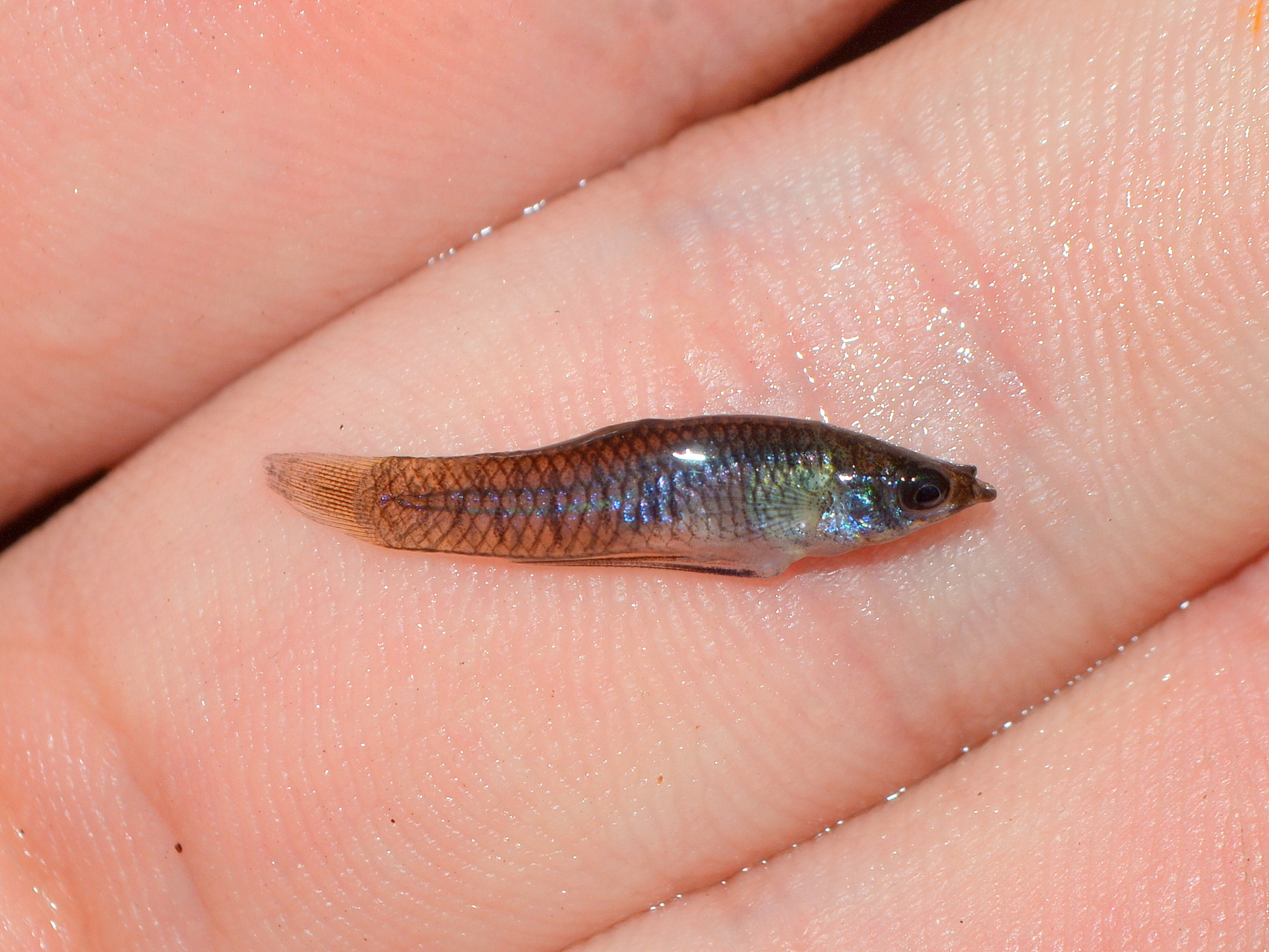
- Phalloptychus iheringii

Scientific classification
- Kingdom: Animalia
- Phylum: Chordata
- Class: Actinopterygii
- Order: Cyprinodontiformes
- Family: Poeciliidae
- Tribe: Cnesterodontini
- Genus: Phalloptychus; C. H. Eigenmann, 1907

Type species
- Girardinus januarius Hensel, 1868

= Phalloptychus =

Genus of fishes

Phalloptychus is a genus of poeciliids that are native to eastern and southern Brazil, northern Argentina, Paraguay and Uruguay.

== Description ==
The maximum length for a male is around 2.5 cm, while for females it is around 3.5 to 4 cm.

== Species ==
There are currently three recognized species in this genus. They are listed below:

- Phalloptychus eigenmanni (Henn, 1916)
- Phalloptychus iheringii (G. A. Boulenger, 1889)
- Phalloptychus januarius (R. F. Hensel, 1868)
