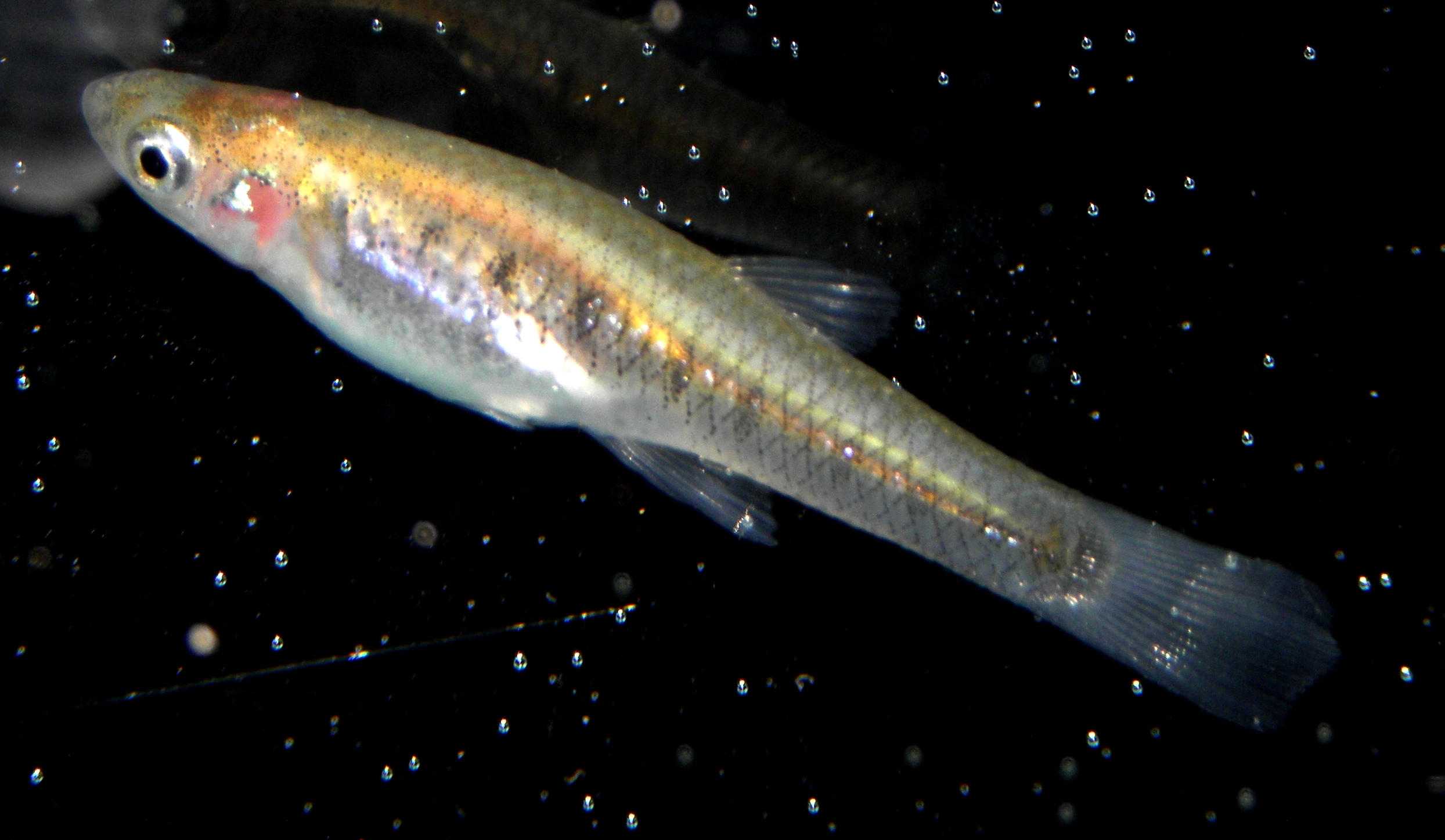
- Ten spotted live-bearer, female (Cnesterodon decemmaculatus).

Scientific classification
- Kingdom: Animalia
- Phylum: Chordata
- Class: Actinopterygii
- Division: Teleostei
- Order: Cyprinodontiformes
- Family: Poeciliidae
- Tribe: Cnesterodontini
- Genus: Cnesterodon; Garman, 1895

Type species
- Poecilia decemmaculata Jenyns, 1842

Synonyms
- Gulapinnus Langer, 1913

= Cnesterodon =

Genus of fishes

Cnesterodon is a genus of poeciliids native to South America.

== Species ==
There are currently 10 recognized species in this genus:

- Cnesterodon brevirostratus R. de S. Rosa & W. J. E. M. Costa, 1993
- Cnesterodon carnegiei Haseman, 1911
- Cnesterodon decemmaculatus (Jenyns, 1842) (Ten spotted live-bearer)
- Cnesterodon holopteros Lucinda, Litz & Recuero, 2006
- Cnesterodon hypselurus Lucinda & Garavello, 2001
- Cnesterodon iguape Lucinda, 2005
- Cnesterodon omorgmatos Lucinda & Garavello, 2001
- Cnesterodon pirai Aguilera, Mirande & Azpelicueta, 2009
- Cnesterodon raddai M. K. Meyer & Etzel, 2001
- Cnesterodon septentrionalis R. de S. Rosa & W. J. E. M. Costa, 1993
