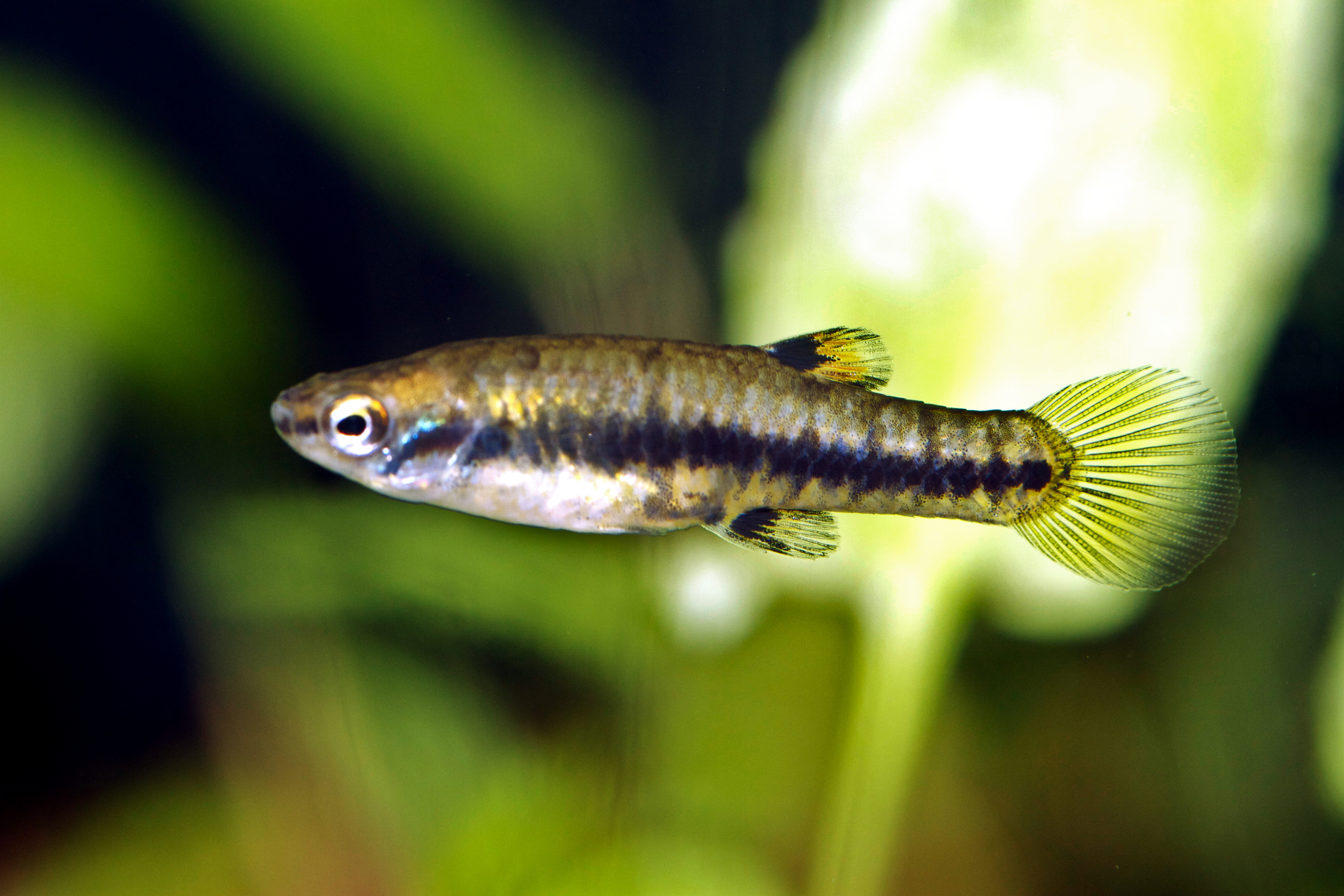
- Least killifish (H. formosa), adult female

Scientific classification
- Kingdom: Animalia
- Phylum: Chordata
- Class: Actinopterygii
- Order: Cyprinodontiformes
- Family: Poeciliidae
- Tribe: Heterandriini
- Genus: Heterandria; Agassiz, 1853

Type species
- Heterandria formosa Girard, 1859

= Heterandria =

Genus of fishes

Heterandria is a genus of livebearing fishes within the family Poeciliidae. Most species occur in Guatemala and its surroundings, particularly Mexico, but the midget livebearer (H. formosa) comes from the southeastern United States.

Though many Poecilidae are familiar aquarium fishes, e.g. guppies, mollies, platys and swordtails, species within Heterandria are not commonly kept as pets. Somewhat more frequently found in aquaria is H. formosa, perhaps because it is one of the smallest known fish species in the world; its diminutive males are probably the smallest fish easy to keep as a pet. Species in this genus resemble egg-laying Cyprinodontoidei such as Fundulidae (topminnows) at first glance, and are thus sometimes called "killifish" though this is technically erroneous.

== Species ==
FishBase currently recognizes 3 species in this genus, but based on genetics, external characters, morphometrics and meristics H. formosa (the type species of the genus) is not closely related to the remaining, which have been moved to their own genus, Pseudoxiphophorus. There are probably more remaining undiscovered as these fishes are rather inconspicuous. However, it is not very likely that many species remain unknown to science as this genus is only found in a rather restricted region, and only one new species has been discovered since 1980.

The three species classified under this genus are:

- Heterandria attenuata D. E. Rosen & R. M. Bailey, 1979
- Heterandria formosa Girard, 1859 (Dwarf livebearer, least killifish)
- Heterandria tuxtlaensis McEachran & T. J. DeWitt, 2008
