= Arthur Wilbur Henn =

American ichthyologist and herpetologist

- Born: March 8, 1890; Evansville, Indiana, US
- Died: May 8, 1959 (aged 69); Winter Park, Florida, US
- Scientific career
- Fields: Ichthyology, Herpetology
- Institutions: Carnegie Museum of Natural History

Arthur Wilbur Henn (March 8, 1890, in Evansville, Indiana – May 8, 1959, in Winter Park, Florida) was an American ichthyologist and herpetologist. Henn succeeded Carl H. Eigenmann to the position of Curator of Fishes at the Carnegie Museum of Natural History. He was the longest-serving Treasurer in the history of the American Society of Ichthyologists and Herpetologists from 1931 to 1949. He dedicated much of his life to conversation and public education.

== Selected taxa author by Henn ==
- Hemigrammus barrigonae Eigenmann & Henn, 1914
- Hyphessobrycon ecuadoriensis Eigenmann & Henn, 1914
- Hyphessobrycon metae Eigenmann & Henn, 1914
- Neoheterandria Henn, 1916
- Neoheterandria elegans Henn, 1916
- Phalloptychus eigenmanni Henn, 1916
- Phallotorynus Henn, 1916
- Phallotorynus fasciolatus Henn, 1916
- Priapichthys chocoensis (Henn, 1916)
- Priapichthys nigroventralis (Eigenmann & Henn, 1912)
- Pseudopoecilia fria (Eigenmann & Henn, 1914)
