= Xenophallus =

Scientific classification
- Kingdom: Animalia
- Phylum: Chordata
- Class: Actinopterygii
- Division: Teleostei
- Order: Cyprinodontiformes
- Family: Poeciliidae
- Genus: Xenophallus; C. L. Hubbs, 1924
- Species: X. umbratilis

Binomial name
- Xenophallus umbratilis (Meek, 1912)

Species of fish

Xenophallus umbratilis is a species of poeciliid fish native to the countries of Nicaragua and Costa Rica. This species grows to a length of 4.5 centimetres (1.8 in) SL. It is the only known member of the genus Xenophallus.

== Etymology ==
The generic name of this species is derived from the Greek word ξένος (xénos, meaning "strange") and the Latin word phallus (meaning "penis"), while its specific name is derived from the Latin word umbrātilis (meaning "remaining in shade"). The full binomial can therefore be translated as "strange shady penis".

== See also ==
- Bony-eared assfish
- Flaccid catshark
- Slippery dick
- List of taxa named after human genitals
