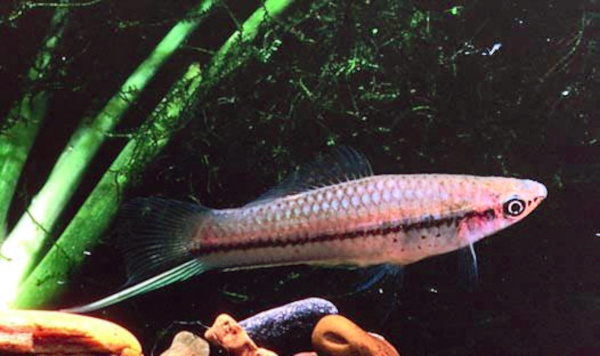
- Green swordtail, Xiphophorus hellerii

Scientific classification
- Kingdom: Animalia
- Phylum: Chordata
- Class: Actinopterygii
- Division: Teleostei
- Order: Cyprinodontiformes
- Superfamily: Poecilioidea
- Family: Poeciliidae; Bonaparte, 1831

Subfamilies and genera
- See text

= Poeciliidae =

Family of ray-finned fishes

Poeciliidae are a family of freshwater ray-finned fishes of the order Cyprinodontiformes, the tooth-carps, and include well-known live-bearing aquarium fish, such as the guppy, molly, platy, and swordtail. The original distribution of the family was the Atlantic side of the Americas, from the Southeastern United States to north of Río de la Plata, Argentina. Due to release of aquarium specimens and the widespread use of species of the genera Poecilia and Gambusia for mosquito control, though, introduced poeciliids can today be found in all tropical and subtropical areas of the world. In addition, Poecilia and Gambusia specimens have been identified in hot spring pools as far north as Banff, Alberta.

== Live-bearing ==
All species in the Poeciliidae are live-bearers. Differences are seen in the mode and degree of support the female gives the developing larvae. Many members of the family Poeciliidae are considered to be lecithotrophic (the mother provisions the oocyte with all the resources it needs prior to fertilization, so the egg is independent of the mother), but others are matrotrophic (literally "mother feeding": the mother provides the majority of resources to the developing offspring after fertilization). Lecithotrophy and matrotrophy are not discrete traits. Most scientific studies quantify matrotrophy using a matrotrophy index (MI), which is the dry mass of fully developed offspring divided by the dry mass of a fertilized egg.

Members of the genus Poeciliopsis, for example, show variable reproductive life history adaptations. Poeciliopsis monacha, P. lucida, and P. prolifica form part of the same clade within that genus. However, their modes of maternal provisioning vary greatly. P. monacha can be considered to be lecithotrophic because it does not really provide any resources for its offspring after fertilization - the pregnant female is basically a swimming egg sac. P. lucida shows an intermediate level of matrotrophy, meaning that to a certain extent the offspring's metabolism can actually affect the mother's metabolism, allowing for increased nutrient exchange. P. prolifica is considered to be highly matrotrophic, and almost all of the nutrients and materials needed for fetal development are supplied to the oocyte after it has been fertilized. This level of matrotrophy allows Poeciliopsis to carry several broods at different stages of development, a phenomenon known as superfetation. Because the space for developing embryos is limited, viviparity reduces brood size. Superfetation can compensate for this loss by keeping embryos at various stages and sizes during development.

P. elongata, P. turneri, and P. presidionis form another clade that could be considered an outgroup to the P. monacha, P.lucida, and P. prolifica clade. These three species are very highly matrotrophic - so much so that in 1947, C. L. Turner described the follicular cells of P. turneri as "pseudo-placenta, pseudo-chorion, and pseudo-allantois". The greater degree of matrotrophy in a species is linked with a higher degree of placentation, including "a thicker maternal follicle, higher degree of vascularization, and greater number of villi in the placenta".

The reason for placental evolution in Poeciliids is controversial, and involves two major groups of hypotheses, adaptive and conflict hypotheses. Adaptive hypotheses, including the locomotor hypothesis, Trexler-DeAngelis Model (reproductive allotment), and life-history facilitation, broadly suggest that the placenta evolved to facilitate the evolution of another advantageous trait in the fish's environment. The conflict hypothesis suggests the placenta is a nonadaptive byproduct of genetic "tug-o-war" between the mother and the offspring for resources.

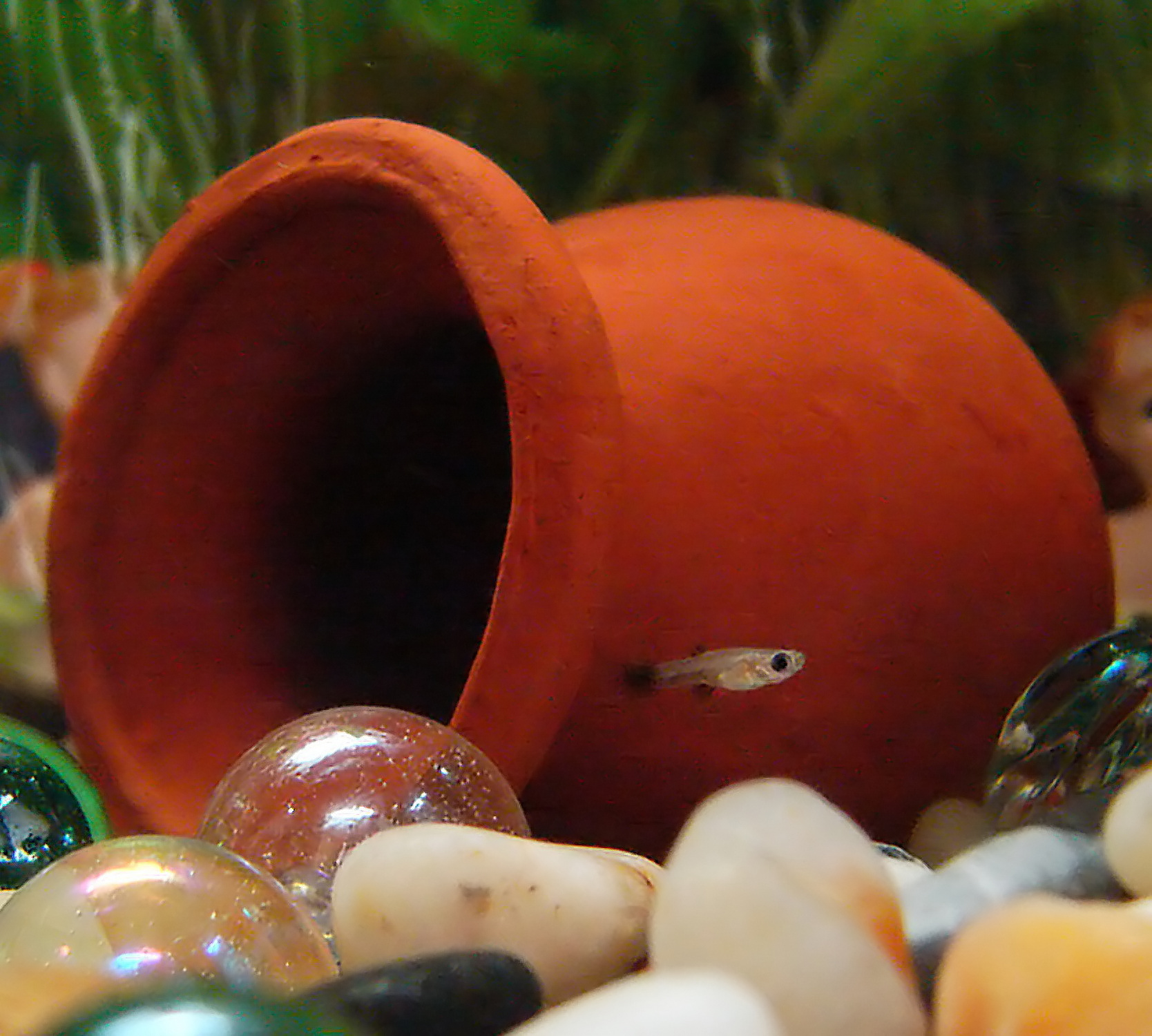
One-week-old fry of P. reticulata (guppy)

== Taxonomy ==
Until recently, the egg-laying African killifish (genera now placed in Procatopodidae and Pantanodontidae) were also placed in the Poeciliidae. This treatment led to hypotheses that the Poeciliidae are an ancient clade that antedate the breakup of Gondwana (the split between Africa and South America) 100 million years ago, and that live-bearing subsequently evolved in South America. However, more recent studies have found this taxonomic treatment to be paraphyletic, and have placed these families outside the Poeciliidae. These new taxonomic treatments support that the Poeciliidae are much younger than previously thought, are entirely a live-bearing group, and are only native to the Americas.

Poeciliids colonized North America through the Antilles, while they were connected 44 million years ago. Poeciliids then moved to Central America by the Aves land bridge on the Caribbean Plate. When South America connected to Central America three million years ago, some further dispersal southward occurred, but South American species did not move into Central America.

=== Genera ===
The family is divided into subfamilies and tribes as follows:

- Subfamily Poeciliinae
  - Tribe Alfarini
    - Genus Alfaro
  - Tribe Gambusini
    - Genus Belonesox
    - Genus Brachyrhaphis
    - Genus Gambusia
    - Genus Heterophallus
  - Tribe Heterandriini
    - Genus Heterandria
    - Genus Neoheterandria
    - Genus Poeciliopsis
    - Genus Priapichthys
    - Genus Pseudopoecilia
    - Genus Xenophallus
  - Tribe Poeciliini
    - Genus Limia
    - Genus Micropoecilia
    - Genus Pamphorichthys
    - Genus Phallichthys
    - Genus Poecilia
    - Genus Xiphophorus
  - Tribe Cnesterodontini
    - Genus Cnesterodon
    - Genus Phalloceros
    - Genus Phalloptychus
    - Genus Phallotorynus
  - Tribe Scolichthyini
    - Genus Scolichthys
- Subfamily Tomeurinae
  - Genus Tomeurus
- Subfamily Xenodexiinae
  - Genus Xenodexia
