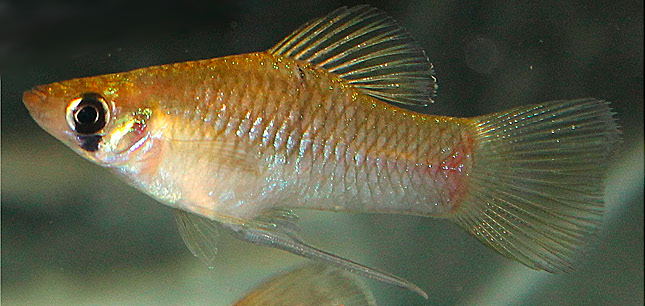
- P. amates male

Scientific classification
- Kingdom: Animalia
- Phylum: Chordata
- Class: Actinopterygii
- Order: Cyprinodontiformes
- Family: Poeciliidae
- Tribe: Poeciliini
- Genus: Phallichthys; C. L. Hubbs, 1924

Type species
- Poeciliopsis isthmensis Regan, 1913

= Phallichthys =

Genus of fishes native to Central America

Phallichthys is a genus of poeciliids native to Central America. They are hardy fish which inhabit stagnant and slow-flowing waters, making them well-suited to fishkeeping.

== Etymology ==
The genus name Phallichthys comes from the Ancient Greek φαλλός (phallós), meaning "penis", and ἰχθύς (ikhthús), meaning "fish", referring to the "comparatively huge" gonopodium, the modified anal fin used for copulation. The common name for P. amates, the merry widow, is sometimes applied to other species in the genus as well.

== Taxonomy ==
There are currently four recognized species in the genus Phallichthys:

- P. amates (N. Miller, 1907) (merry widow livebearer)
- P. fairweatheri D. E. Rosen & R. M. Bailey, 1959 (Picotee livebearer)
- P. quadripunctatus W. A. Bussing, 1979
- P. tico W. A. Bussing, 1963
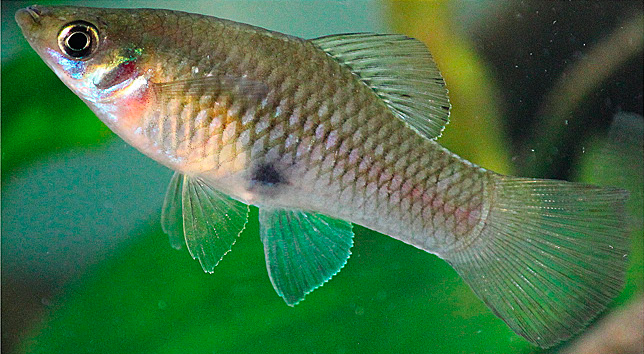
P. amates female

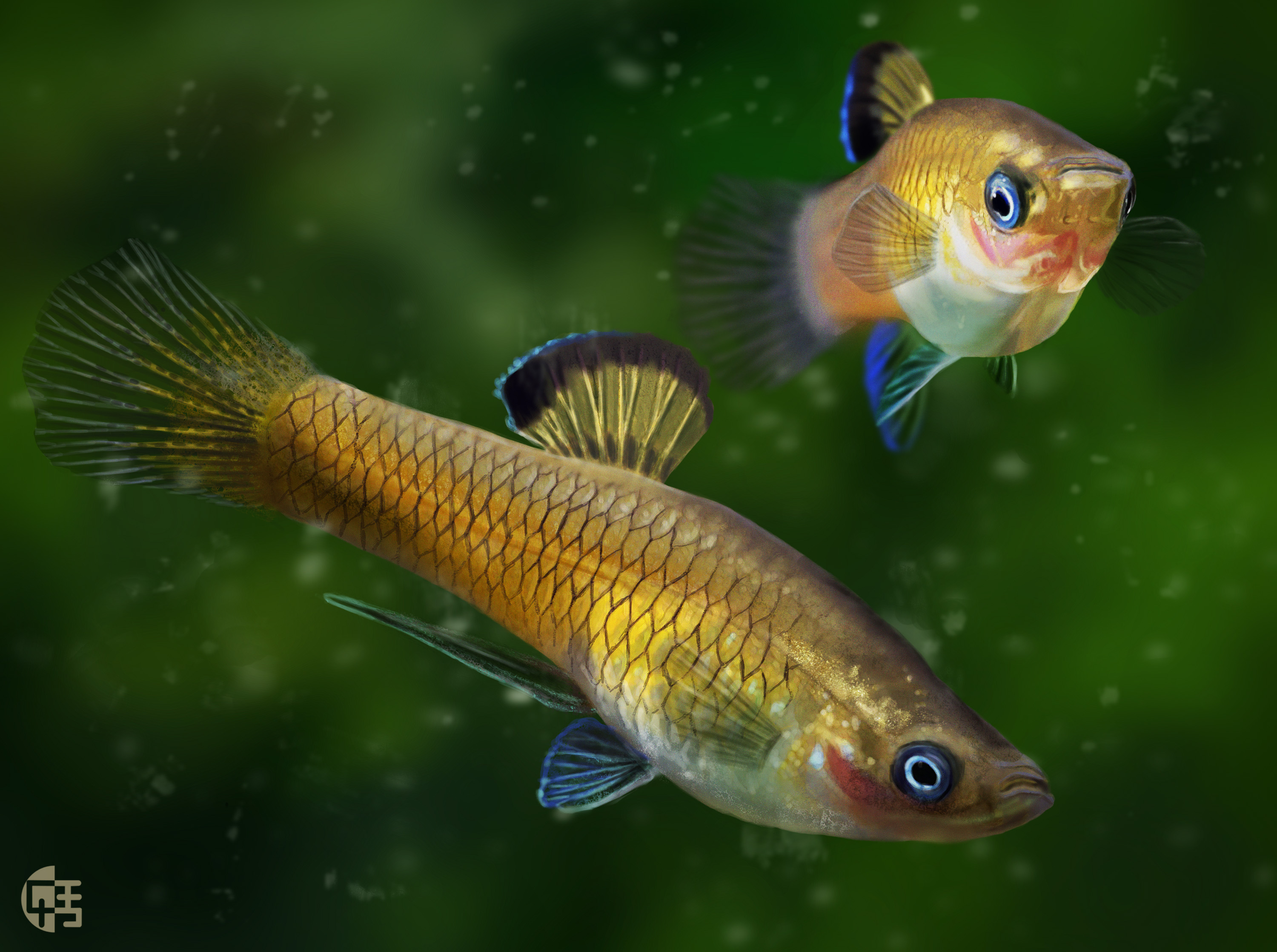
P. tico male and female

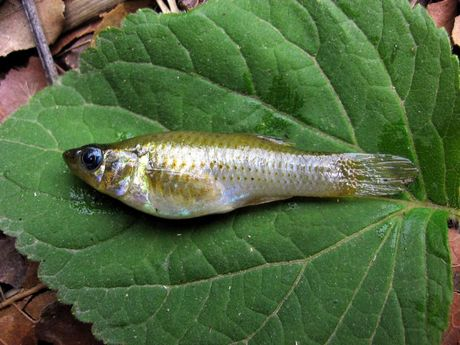
P. fairweatheri

The sister clade to the genus includes genera Neoheterandria and Poeciliopsis.

== Ecology ==
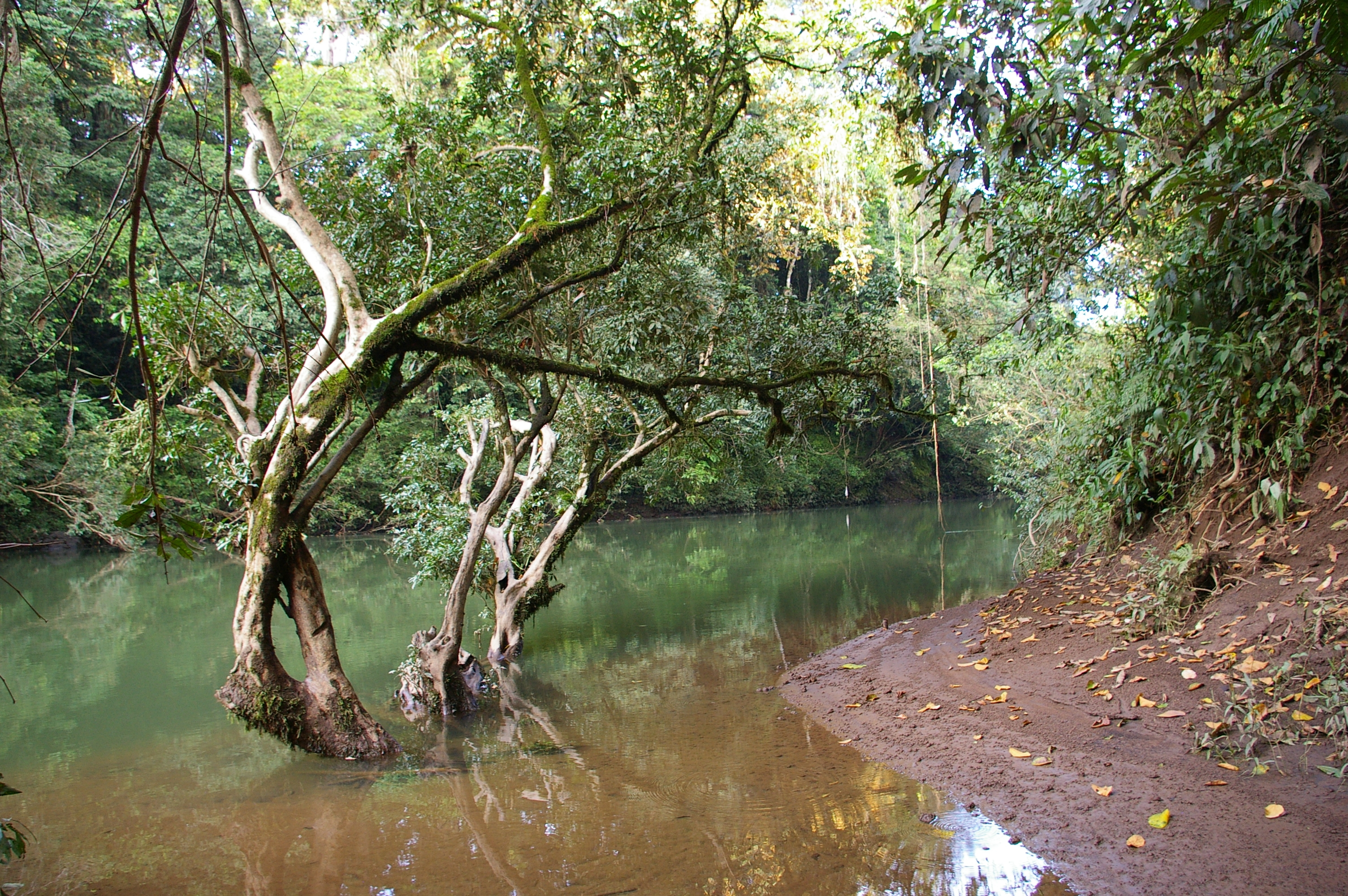
A typical habitat: a slow-flowing section of the Rio Puerto Viejo near La Selva Biological Station, Costa Rica, and the type location of P. tico

Phallichthys species are found primarily on the Atlantic slope of Central America. They prefer shallow, stagnant or slow-flowing waters and muddy substrate. Aquatic plants are often present in their habitat. Their diet consists mainly of algae and aufwuchs but small aquatic invertebrates are occasionally taken as well.

== Reproduction ==
Phallichthys males are not known to display any courtship behavior, but the female's cooperation is nevertheless necessary for reproduction. When mating, the male approaches the female from below and behind. The gonopodium, then extended in front of the male's head, delivers spermatophores into the female's genital pore.

Phallichthys species are livebearers: the female gives birth to live fry after a gestation of about four weeks or as short as just over three weeks in high temperatures. The number of the fry produced depends on the size of the female. Superfoetation has not been recorded; all species produce a single brood before developing another. Superfoetation existed in the ancestral species but has been subsequently lost. The offspring do not obtain nutrients from the mother during gestation.

The fry receive no parental care and are able to fend for themselves from birth. The adults do not normally prey on the fry, which are born looking like miniature versions of their parents. They feed ravenously and grow quickly. Males start developing gonopodia at about 7 weeks of age, while females start reproducing at 10 to 12 weeks.

== Aquarium husbandry ==
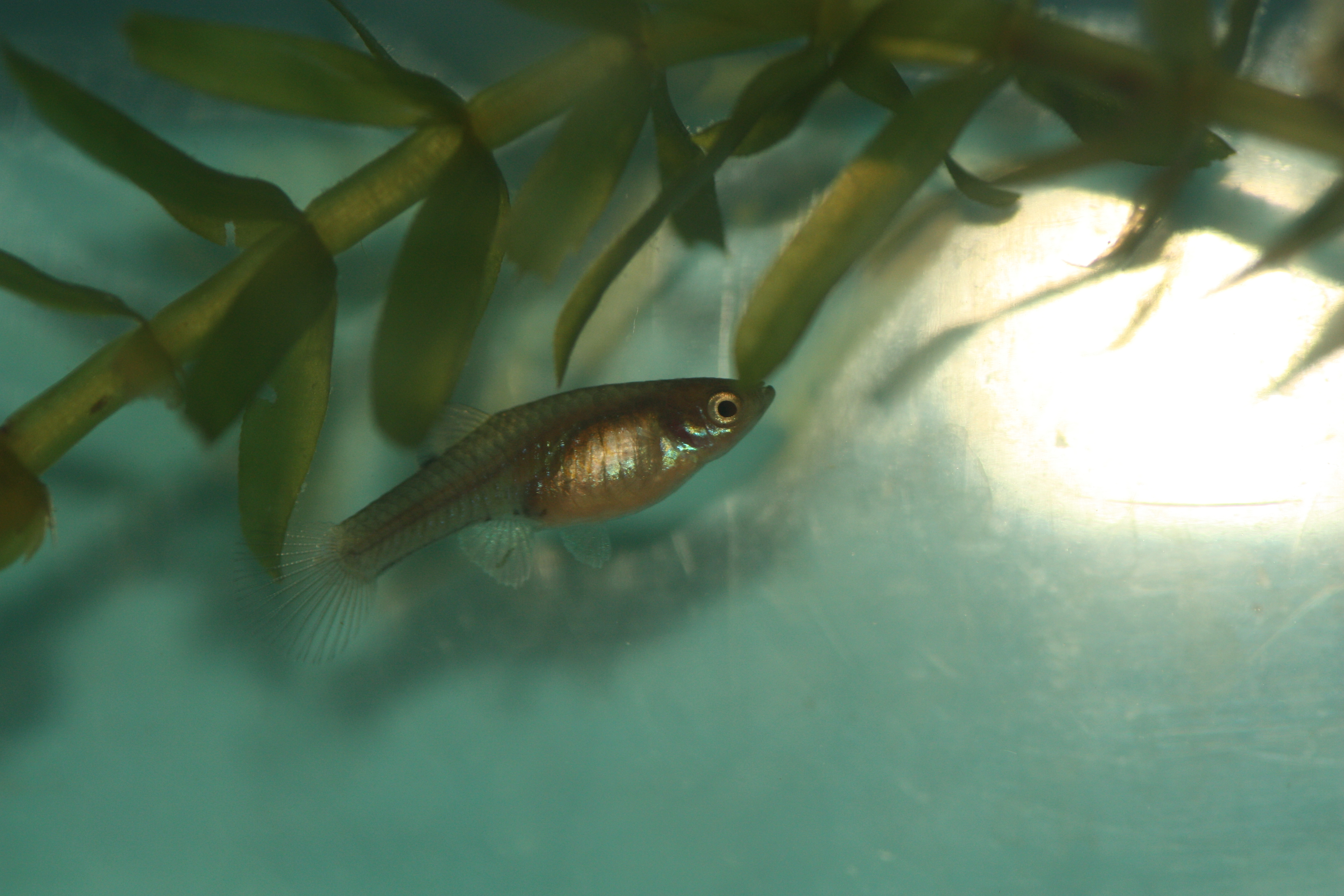
P. tico female in an aquarium

Though not commonly sold, Phallichthys are easy to care for in the home aquarium due to their hardiness, peacefulness, and outgoing disposition. Other than hardness, water parameters are not important. The fish are reportedly able to distinguish their caregiver from other humans. It is possible to keep them with other species, but their fry are vulnerable to predation. The fish do particularly well in planted aquariums and accept a variety of food. A heater is not required.
