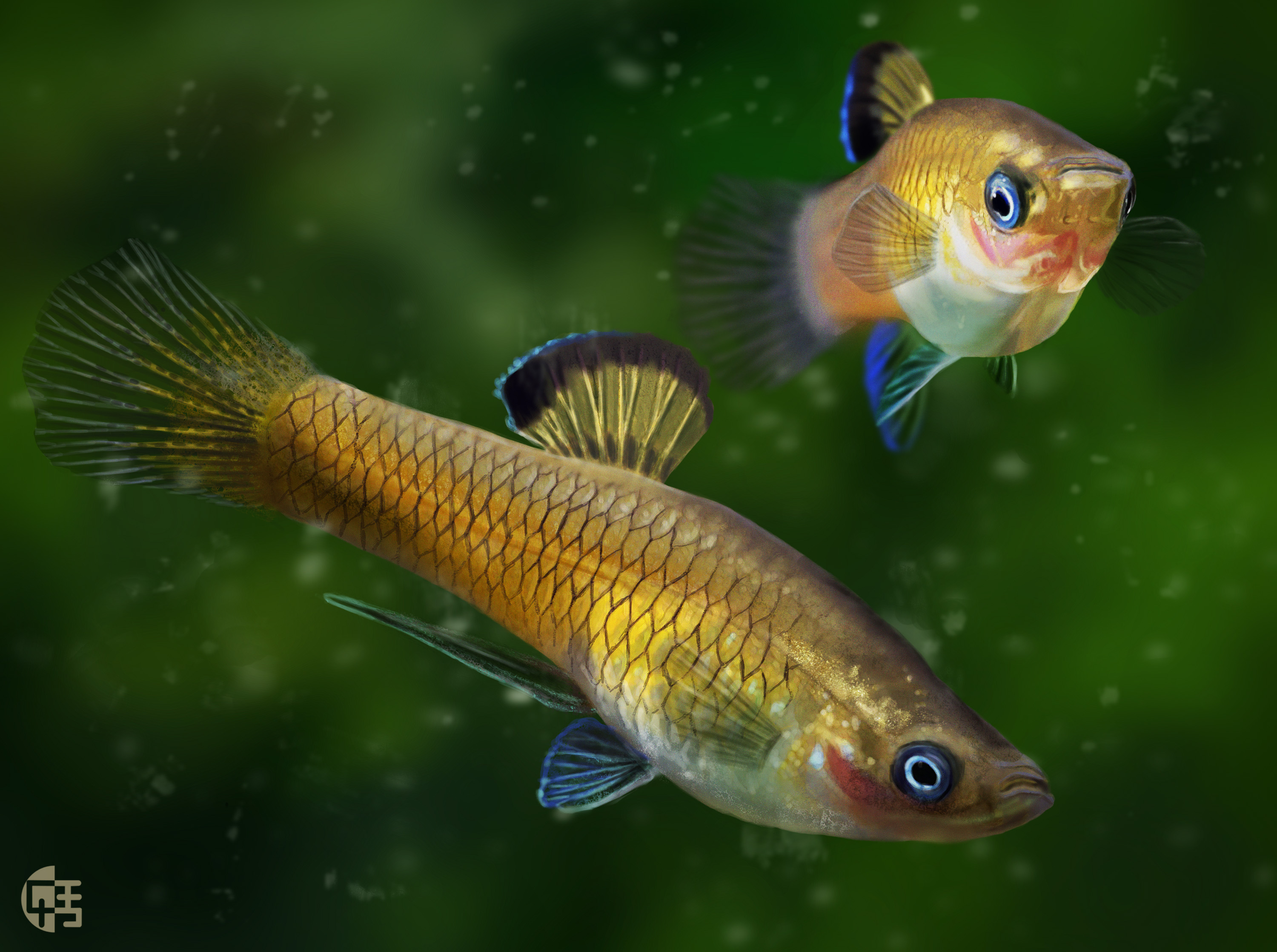
- A male (down) and a female (up)

Conservation status
- Vulnerable (IUCN 3.1)

Scientific classification
- Kingdom: Animalia
- Phylum: Chordata
- Class: Actinopterygii
- Order: Cyprinodontiformes
- Family: Poeciliidae
- Genus: Phallichthys
- Species: P. tico

Binomial name
- Phallichthys tico W. A. Bussing, 1963

= Phallichthys tico =

Dwarf merry widow

Species of fish

Phallichthys tico, the dwarf merry widow, is a livebearer fish from Central America. It lives in turbid, stagnant waters, often among aquatic plants, and feeds mainly on plant matter. It is sometimes kept in aquaria.

== Taxonomy and evolution ==
Phallichthys tico appears to be the most specialized species in the genus Phallichthys. Its phylogenetic relationship to P. amates and P. fairweatheri is not known. Besides these two congeners, P. tico exhibits some similarity to other genera in the Poecilidae family, most of all Poeciliopsis and Carlhubbsia. Its inclusion into Phallichthys necessitated a considerable redefinition of the genus.

The specific epithet tico honors Costa Rica, the only country from which it was known at the time of its 1963 description by the future University of Costa Rica professor William Bussing.

== Description ==
The body of Phallichthys tico is tan and robust but more elongated than that of other Phallichthys species, which tend to have deeper bodies. It features 8 to 10 bars, which are somewhat obscure in adult females. The male's gonopodium is relatively long but not as much as in related species. Females grow to 35 millimetres (1.4 in). Males are usually much smaller.

== Distribution and ecology ==
Phallichthys tico is known exclusively from Lake Nicaragua and the tributaries of the San Juan River.

The species is found over muddy bottoms in stagnant, turbid waters such as swamps and river backwaters as well as the shorelines of Lakes Nicaragua and Arenal, where it occurs among floating aquatic plants. The temperatures range from 23 to 30 °C (73 to 86 °F). Though usually found in midwater, the fish frequently browse on the bottom in the shallows or swim in groups of 20–30 individuals near the surface next to grassy shores. Easily frightened, they seek cover among plants at any disturbance.

The species' diet consists primarily of ooze, unicellular algae, and diatoms. Protozoans and insect larvae are occasionally taken while crustaceans are ignored.

== Reproduction and husbandry ==
Phallichthys tico is a livebearer: the female gives birth to live young, about 12 at a time, relatively few in comparison to related species.

The species is uncommon in fishkeeping despite its ease of care in the home aquarium. The fish tend to stay hidden among plants at the surface or the bottom and only venture out when undisturbed. They readily accept dry food.
