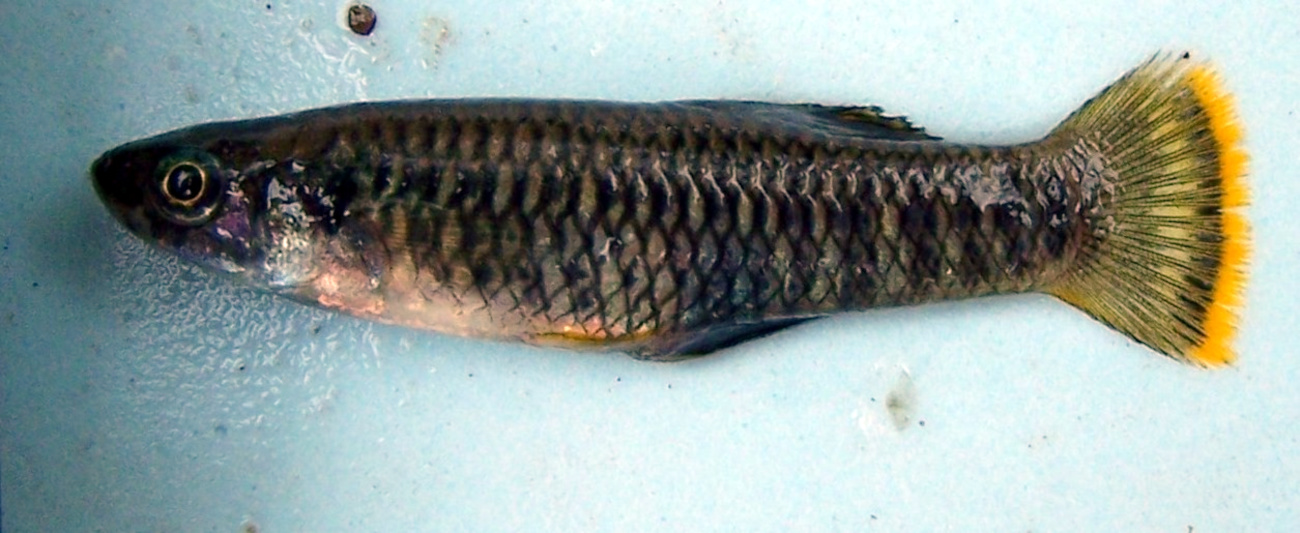
- Male
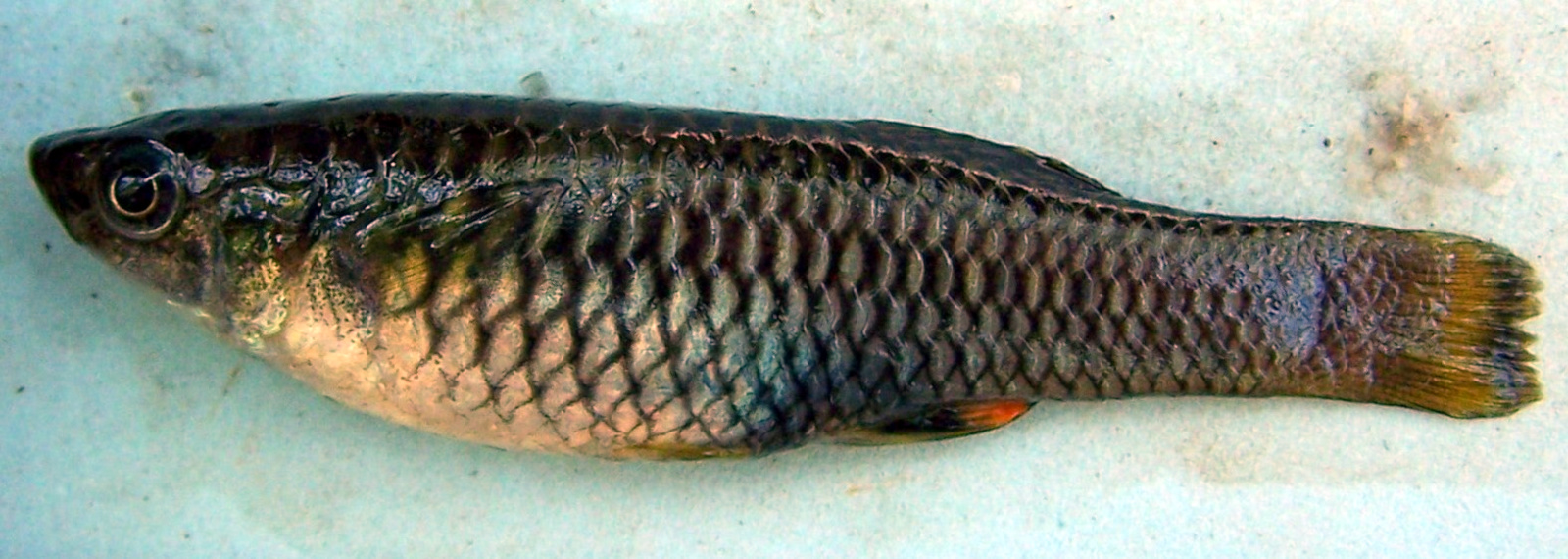
- Female

Conservation status
- Vulnerable (IUCN 3.1)

Scientific classification
- Kingdom: Animalia
- Phylum: Chordata
- Class: Actinopterygii
- Order: Cyprinodontiformes
- Family: Poeciliidae
- Genus: Brachyrhaphis
- Species: B. rhabdophora

Binomial name
- Brachyrhaphis rhabdophora (Regan, 1908)

Synonyms
- Gambusia rhabdophora Regan, 1908

= Brachyrhaphis rhabdophora =

Species of livebearer fish

Brachyrhaphis rhabdophora, commonly known as the lace brachy, is a poeciliid fish from Costa Rica.

B. rhabdophora is similar to B. roseni, with a shorter gonopodium than B. olomina. Rosen and Bailey (1963) considered B. olomina to be a synonym of B. rhabdophora. By 1998 Bussing had demonstrated that these two Brachyrhaphis populations should be treated as different species.

B. rhabdophora grows to 6 cm (2.4 in). It has a straight or a slightly arched profile and up to 12 vertical stripes on the sides, which are more conspicuous in males and may be absent in large females. A half of the dorsal fin is yellow or orange, and the fin has a dark margin. The margin of the caudal fin is also yellow or orange; males additionally have a dark band before the margin. The anal fin is yellow with a dark blotch. Females are larger than males and have a stronger build.

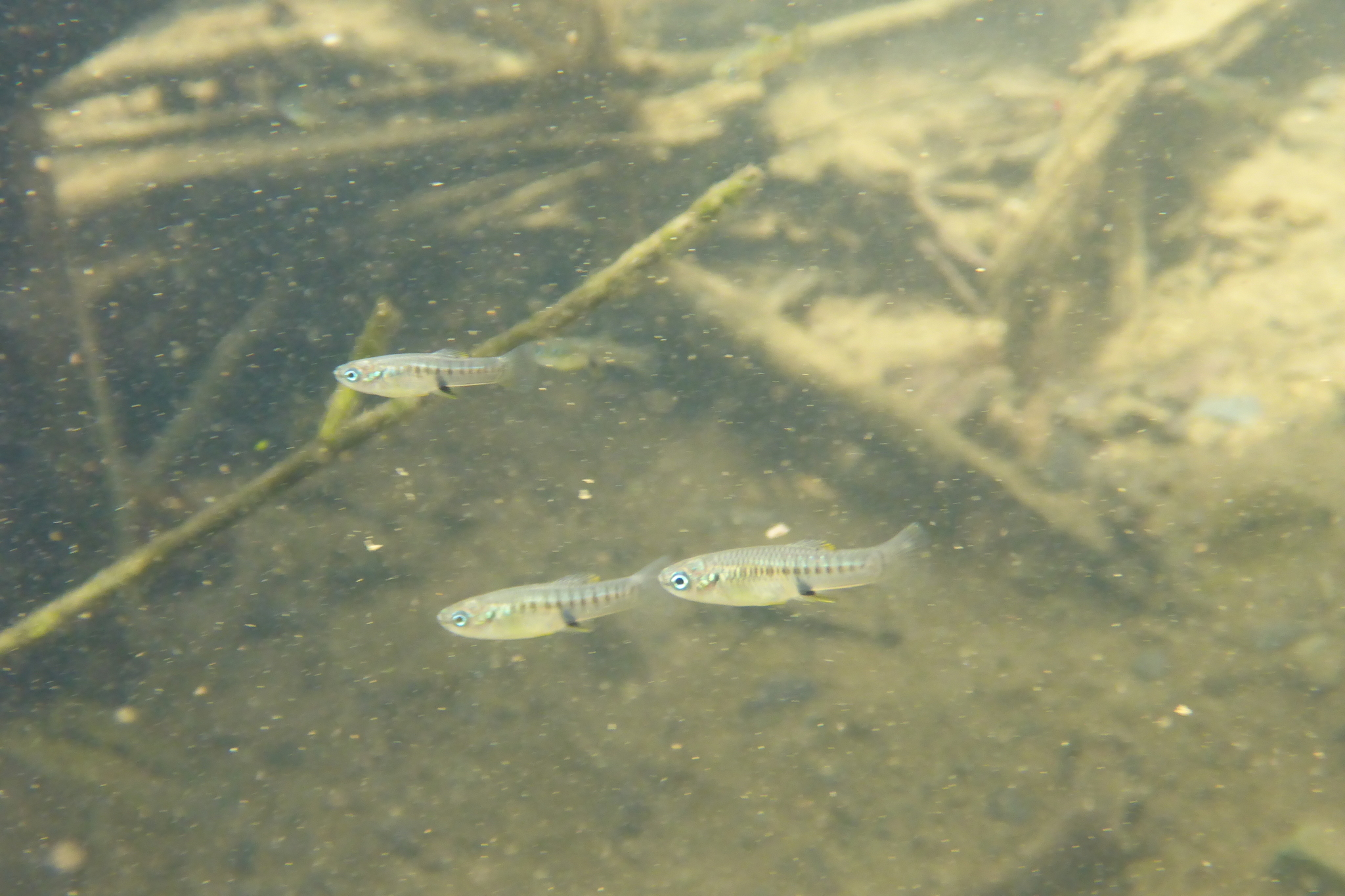
A shoal in their natural habitat

B.s rhabdophora prefers waters with low to moderate current and is only rarely found in fast flowing waters. The species primarily inhabits the surface and midwaters of creeks and brooks. Its habitats are between 3 and 1,450 m (10 and 4,760 ft) above sea level. These include highland streams and lagoons. Temperature ranges from 22 to 32 °C (72 to 90 °F).

B. rhabdophora is endemic to Costa Rica. It is found on the Pacific slope between the Parrita River drainage and the Térraba River. The species has been recorded in Pirrís, Tusubres and Térraba River.

B. rhabdophora feeds on insects. It is also a voracious predator of its own young, which makes aquarium breeding difficult.
