= Poeciliopsis monacha =

Conservation status
- Endangered (IUCN 3.1)

Scientific classification
- Kingdom: Animalia
- Phylum: Chordata
- Class: Actinopterygii
- Division: Teleostei
- Order: Cyprinodontiformes
- Family: Poeciliidae
- Genus: Poeciliopsis
- Species: P. monacha

Binomial name
- Poeciliopsis monacha R. R. Miller, 1960

Species of fish

Poeciliopsis monacha, or the headwater livebearer, is a species of freshwater fish in the family Poeciliidae. It is endemic to Mexico.

== Distribution and habitat ==
Poeciliopsis monacha is endemic to northwestern Mexico where it is present in the upper reaches of streams and arroyos on the western side of the Sierra Madre Occidental mountain range. Some of these watercourses dry up during the summer and the fish may have to survive in springs and pools. Conditions are harsh in winter in the headwaters of the streams at altitudes of around 1,000 m (3,300 ft); there may be frosts and snow may fall. The fish become torpid at temperatures below about 12 °C (54 °F), but there are some hot springs, and water exposed to the sun may warm up during the day. In the summer, no precipitation occurs, much of the water evaporates, and fish may have to survive in dwindling pools where temperatures above about 40 °C (104 °F) will be lethal.

== Ecology ==
In addition to the stress factors induced by trying to survive in summer in decreasing and warming waters, some pools have very low oxygen levels, exacerbated at night by the lack of the photosynthetic oxygen produced by plants, and often lower at the pool base where the fish feed, or under the mats of algae that tend to accumulate. Under these circumstances, the fish may resort to "surface skimming", a behaviour that allows them to obtain enough oxygen at the interface of water and air.

P monacha is a viviparous species of fish with the young developing in an outgrowth of the female's pericardial sac. After mating, sperm is stored in folds in the ovary lining, and several clutches of young can develop simultaneously at different stages of development.

P. monacha hybridises with Poeciliopsis lucida and Poeciliopsis occidentalis. When a female of P. monacha mates with a male of either of these two species, the offspring are invariably female. In fact this all-female breeding line can be maintained indefinitely in the laboratory by repeatedly back-crossing the offspring to males of P. lucida and P. occidentalis. In the headwaters of the Fuerte River in northwestern Mexico, it is found that only the bisexual form of P. monacha is present in the highest waters, and the proportion of unisexual individuals increases progressively downstream from here.

P. monacha are highly cannibalistic and the juvenile fishes tend to hide from their mother close to the substrate. P. lucida is the reverse, and the young swim beside their mother. Hybrids between the two species are intermediate between these two behaviours.

Poeciliopsis monacha sometimes exhibits black spot disease, caused by parasitic trematode larvae. The parasites burrow into the body wall of the fish and forms tiny cysts. Some authorities consider that infection reduces reproductive success while other authorities believe that fecundity is unaffected.

== Ancient clonal lineage ==
The unisexual (all female) hybridogenetic fish Poeciliopsis monacha-occidentalis is an ancient clonal lineage that appears to be more than 100,000 generations old. P. monacha was the maternal ancestor of this lineage and P. occidentalis was the paternal ancestor. In these hybridogenetic fish only the haploid maternal P. monacha genome (M), but not the paternal genome, is transmitted to ova (hemiclonal reproduction). The paternal P. occidentalis genome (O) is excluded during a pre-meiotic cell division, thus avoiding synapsis and crossing-over. Fertilization of haploid (M) eggs by O sperm occurs during mating with P. occidentalis males. This fertilization restores diploidy and results in expression of maternal and paternal traits in somatic tissue. These findings indicate that clonal reproduction in a vertebrate lineage is not necessarily transient, but can achieve a substantial evolutionary age.
