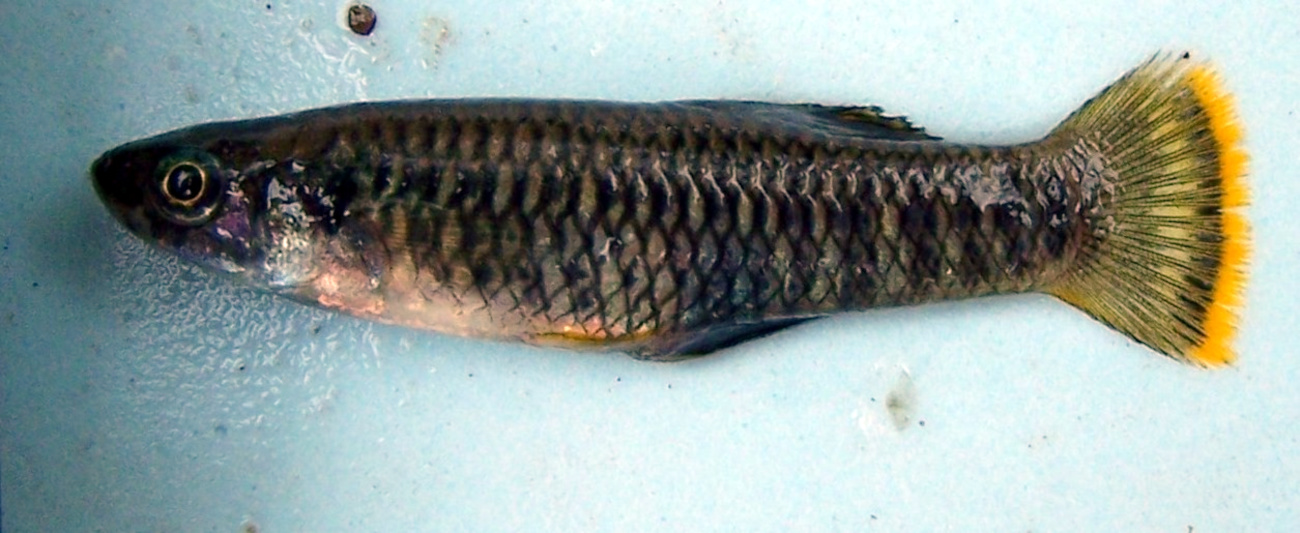

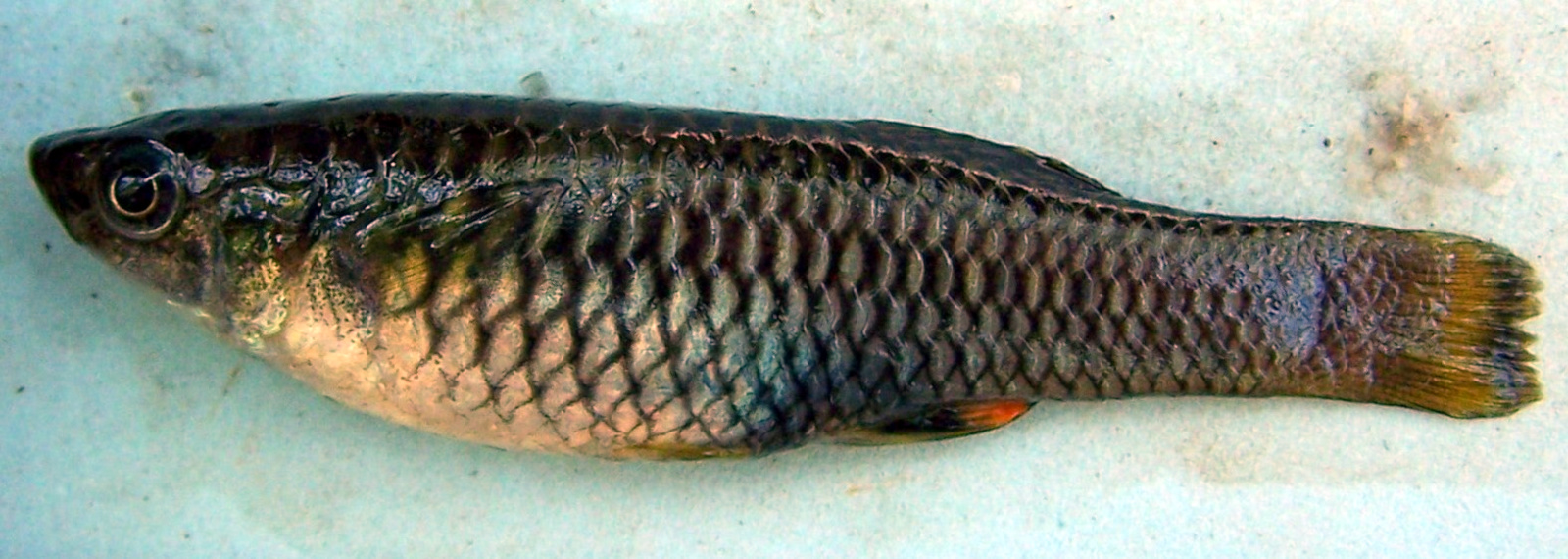
- B. rhabdophora - Male (top) & Female (bottom)

Scientific classification
- Kingdom: Animalia
- Phylum: Chordata
- Class: Actinopterygii
- Order: Cyprinodontiformes
- Family: Poeciliidae
- Tribe: Gambusiini
- Genus: Brachyrhaphis; Regan, 1913

Type species
- Gambusia rhabdophora Regan, 1908

= Brachyrhaphis =

Genus of fishes

Brachyrhaphis is a genus of poeciliids native to freshwater habitats in Central America. Most are restricted to Panama and Costa Rica, but B. holdridgei also occurs in Nicaragua and B. hartwegi is from Mexico and Guatemala. A phylogenetic analysis published in 2015 suggested that Brachyrhaphis may not be of a monophyletic group.

== Species ==
There are currently 12 recognized species in this genus:

- Brachyrhaphis cascajalensis (Meek & Hildebrand, 1913)
- Brachyrhaphis episcopi (Steindachner, 1878)
- Brachyrhaphis hartwegi D. E. Rosen & R. M. Bailey, 1963 (Soconusco gambusia)
- Brachyrhaphis hessfeldi M. K. Meyer & Etzel, 2001
- Brachyrhaphis holdridgei W. A. Bussing, 1967
- Brachyrhaphis olomina (Meek, 1914)
- Brachyrhaphis parismina (Meek, 1912)
- Brachyrhaphis punctifer (C. L. Hubbs, 1926)
- Brachyrhaphis rhabdophora (Regan, 1908)
- Brachyrhaphis roseni W. A. Bussing, 1988
- Brachyrhaphis roswithae M. K. Meyer & Etzel, 1998
- Brachyrhaphis terrabensis (Regan, 1907)
