= Lepidonectes =

Scientific classification
- Kingdom: Animalia
- Phylum: Chordata
- Class: Actinopterygii
- Order: Blenniiformes
- Family: Tripterygiidae
- Subfamily: Tripterygiinae
- Genus: Lepidonectes; W. A. Bussing (ex Rosenblatt), 1991

Type species
- Enneapterygius corallicola Kendall & Radcliffe, 1912

Species
- See text.

Genus of fishes

Lepidonectes is a genus of triplefins in the family Tripterygiidae. They are found in the eastern Pacific Ocean.

== Species ==
There are three species currently recognised within Lepidonectes:

- Twinspot triplefin, Lepidonectes bimaculata Allen & Robertson, 1992
- Signal triplefin, Lepidonectes clarkhubbsi W. A. Bussing, 1991
- Galapagos triplefin blenny, Lepidonectes corallicola (Kendall & Radcliffe, 1912)

== Etymology ==
The generic name means "scaly swimmer" and refers to the scaled head and body and the scaled patch at the base of the pectoral fin.
