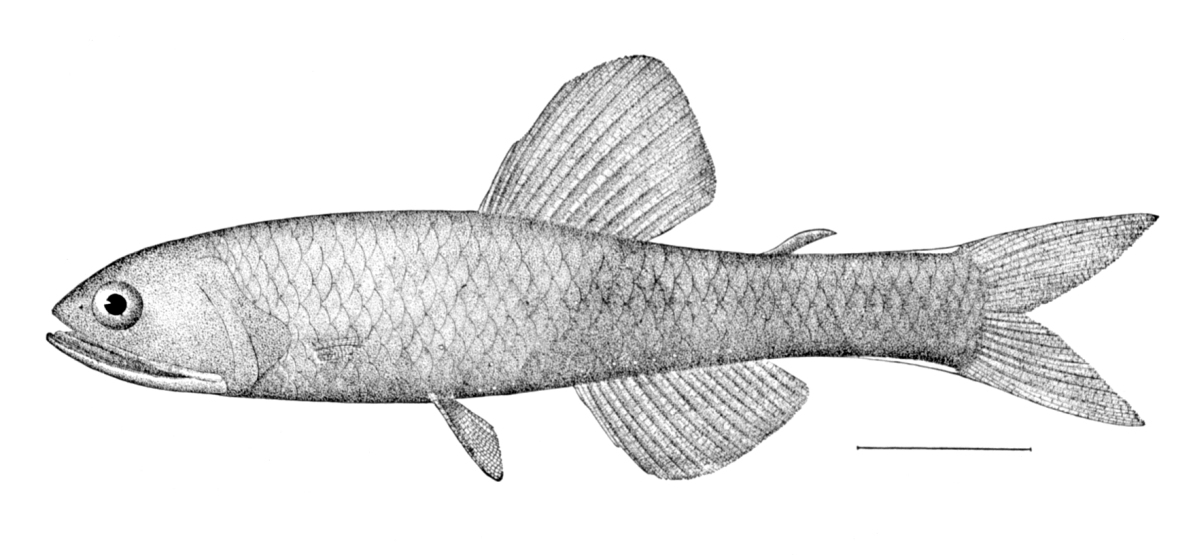
- Lampanyctus macdonaldi

Scientific classification
- Kingdom: Animalia
- Phylum: Chordata
- Class: Actinopterygii
- Order: Myctophiformes
- Family: Myctophidae
- Genus: Lampanyctus; Bonaparte, 1840

Species
- See text.

= Lampanyctus =

Lampanyctus Temporal range: Late Miocene to Present

Genus of fishes

Lampanyctus is a genus of lanternfishes.

== Species ==
There are currently 39 recognized species in this genus:

- Lampanyctus acanthurus Wisner, 1974 (Spinytail lampfish)
- Lampanyctus achirus Andriashev, 1962 (Cripplefin Lanternfish)
- Lampanyctus alatus Goode & T. H. Bean, 1896 (Winged lanternfish)
- Lampanyctus ater Tåning, 1928 (Dusky lanternfish)
- Lampanyctus australis Tåning, 1932 (Southern lanternfish)
- Lampanyctus bristori Zahuranec, 2000
- Lampanyctus crocodilus (A. Risso, 1810) (Jewel lanternfish)
- Lampanyctus crypticus Zahuranec, 2000
- Lampanyctus cuprarius Tåning, 1928
- Lampanyctus festivus Tåning, 1928 (Festive lanternfish)
- Lampanyctus gibbsi Zahuranec, 2000
- Lampanyctus hawaiiensis Zahuranec, 2000
- Lampanyctus hubbsi Wisner, 1963
- Lampanyctus idostigma A. E. Parr, 1931
- Lampanyctus indicus Zahuranec, 2000
- Lampanyctus intricarius Tåning, 1928 (Diamondcheek lanternfish)
- Lampanyctus isaacsi Wisner, 1971
- Lampanyctus iselinoides W. A. Bussing, 1965
- Lampanyctus jordani C. H. Gilbert, 1913 (Brokenline lanternfish)
- Lampanyctus lepidolychnus Becker, 1967 (Mermaid lanternfish)
- Lampanyctus lineatus Tåning, 1928
- Lampanyctus macdonaldi (Goode & T. H. Bean, 1896) (Rakery beaconlamp)
- Lampanyctus macropterus (A. B. Brauer, 1904)
- Lampanyctus niger Günther, 1887 (Black lanternfish)
- Lampanyctus nobilis Tåning, 1928 (Noble lampfish)
- Lampanyctus omostigma C. H. Gilbert, 1908
- Lampanyctus parvicauda A. E. Parr, 1931 (Slimtail lampfish)
- Lampanyctus photonotus A. E. Parr, 1928
- Lampanyctus phyllisae Zahuranec, 2000
- Lampanyctus pusillus (J. Y. Johnson, 1890) (Pygmy lanternfish)
- Lampanyctus regalis Gilbert, 1892) (Pinpoint lampfish)
- Lampanyctus ritteri Gilbert, 1915) (Broadfin lampfish)
- Lampanyctus simulator Wisner, 1971
- Lampanyctus steinbecki Bolin, 1939 (Longfin lampfish)
- Lampanyctus tenuiformis (A. B. Brauer, 1906)
- Lampanyctus turneri (Fowler, 1934)
- Lampanyctus vadulus Hulley, 1981
- Lampanyctus wisneri Zahuranec, 2000
