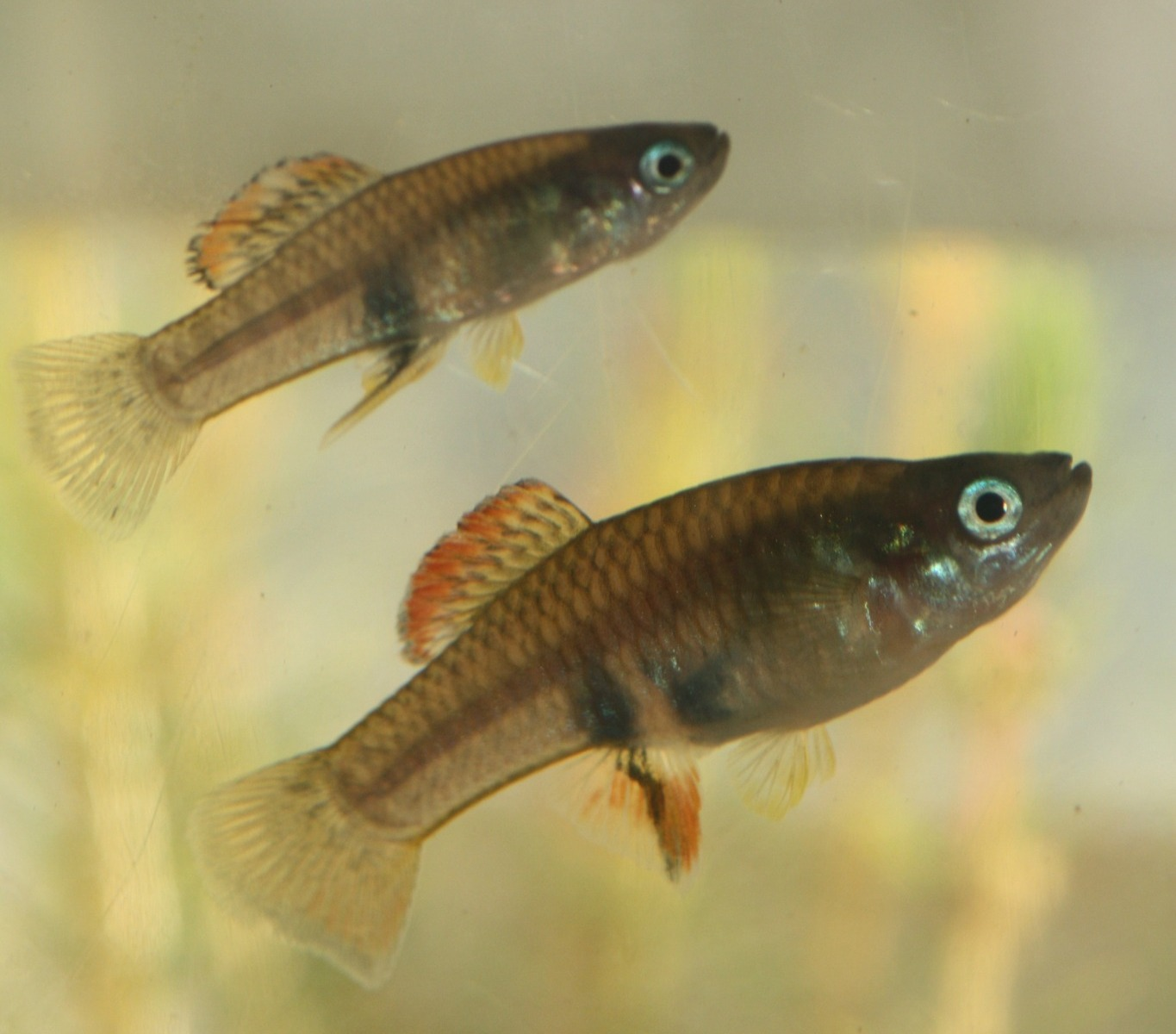
- Male (top) and female (bottom)

Conservation status
- Near Threatened (IUCN 3.1)

Scientific classification
- Kingdom: Animalia
- Phylum: Chordata
- Class: Actinopterygii
- Order: Cyprinodontiformes
- Family: Poeciliidae
- Genus: Brachyrhaphis
- Species: B. roseni

Binomial name
- Brachyrhaphis roseni Bussing, 1988

= Brachyrhaphis roseni =

Cardinal brachy

Species of livebearer fish

Brachyrhaphis roseni, commonly known as the cardinal brachy, is a poeciliid fish from Central America.

== Description ==
Brachyrhaphis roseni was scientifically described by William Bussing in 1988, but was known to livebearers enthusiasts from the 1960s. It grows to 6 cm. The fish have a slightly arched body and twelve dark vertical stripes, which are normally more prominent in males. The dorsal fin is half orange with a dark margin. The caudal fin has an orange edge; in males there is also a dark band before the edge. There are commonly dark stripes near the base of the fin. The anal fin is yellowish with a dark blotch. B. roseni is similar to the related species B. rhabdophora.

== Ecology ==
Brachyrhaphis roseni is distributed along the Pacific slope of Central America, from the drainage of the Coto Colorado River in Costa Rica to the Santa María River in western Panama. The species is common throughout much of its range, but rare in the south of Costa Rica. It is frequently found together with B. terrabensis, but the latter species tends to replace it in headwaters. In the north it is replaced by B. rhabdophora and in the south by other Brachyrhaphis species.

Brachyrhaphis roseni lives in stagnant and slow to moderately fast flowing waters. It may be found on the surface or in the midwaters. Its habitats are between 10 and 651 m above sea level, and the water temperature ranges from 22 to 30 °C. At lower elevations the temperature is higher, the flow is slower, and the substrate consists of sand, gravel, and mud, whereas at higher elevations the water is cooler and faster and runs over small stones and medium to large boulders.

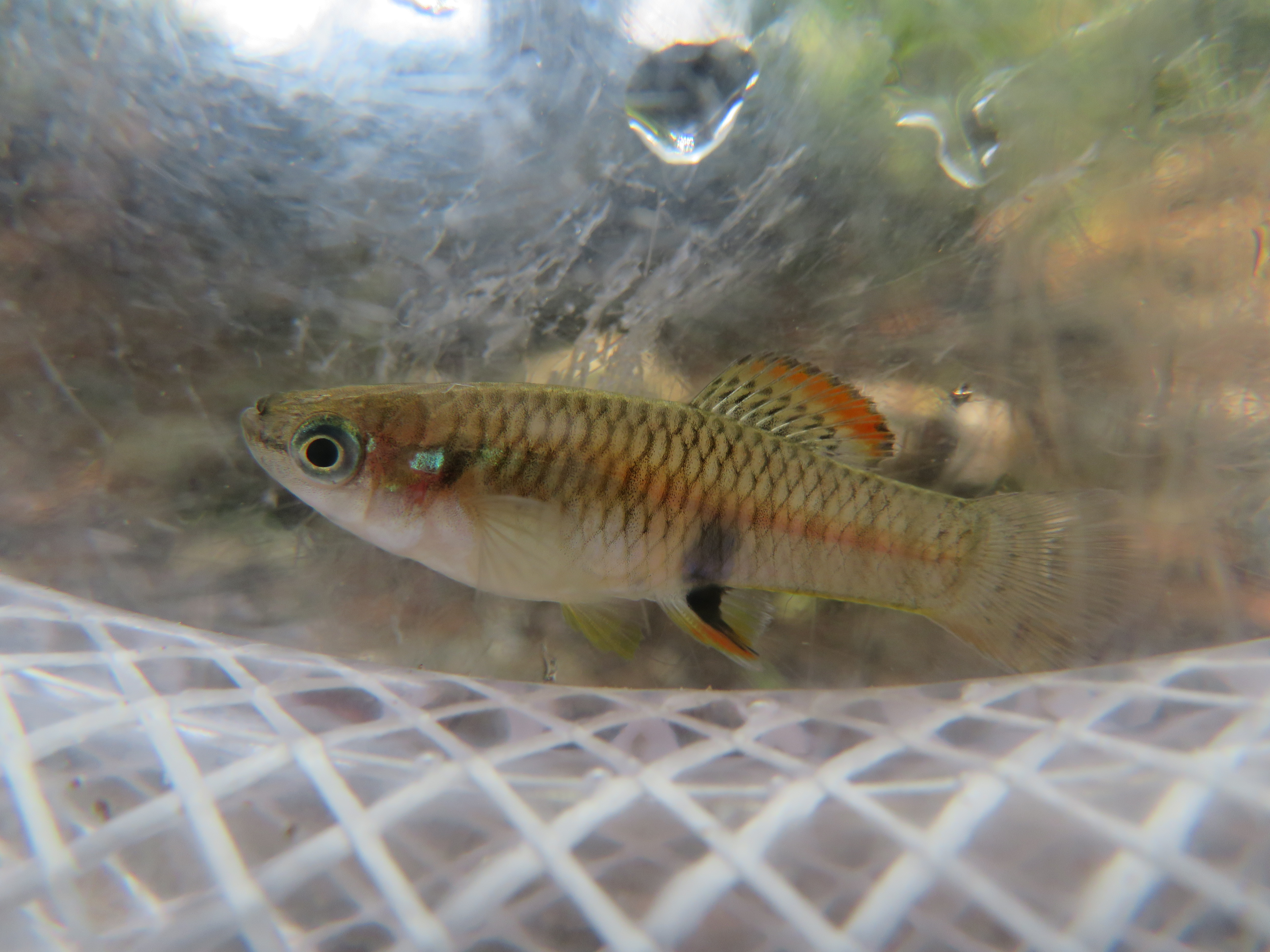
A male caught in the wild in Puntarenas Province, Costa Rica

B. roseni frequently occurs with a variety of predatory fish species. One habitat, a creek by the Pan-American Highway near the border with Costa Rica–Panama border, is composed of large boulders, and there B. roseni stays in the shallow waters along with Rivulus hildebrandi; the deeper waters are inhabited by Poecilia gillii, a Curimata species, an Astyanax species, and certain cichlids, which are larger and dominate B. roseni. An evolutionarily distinct population inhabits a sulphide-rich spring in the David River drainage.

Brachyrhaphis roseni feeds chiefly on insects. It gives birth to live young, and reproduces throughout the year.

== Fishkeeping ==
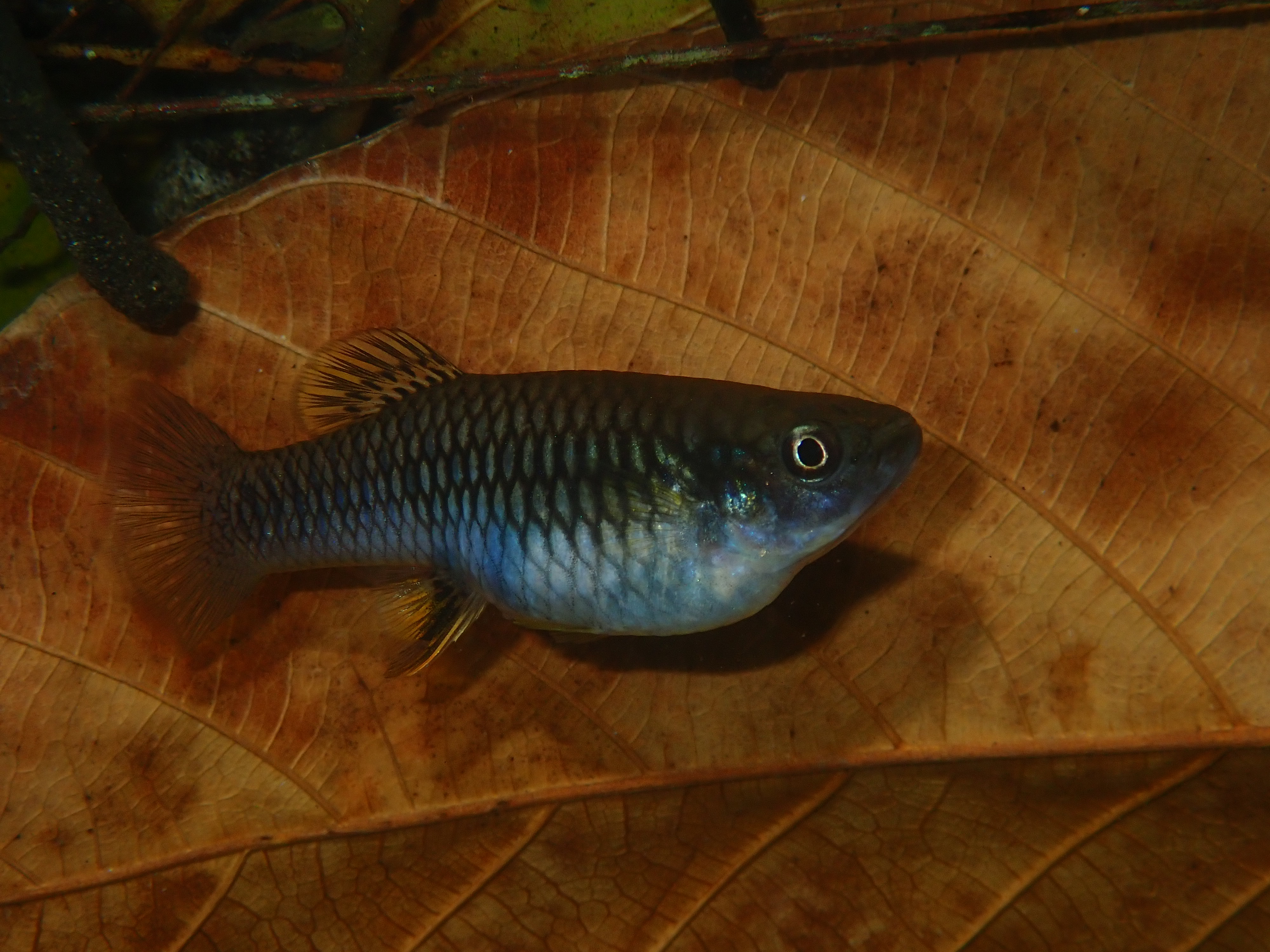
A gravid female in an aquarium. B. roseni have proved to be highly cannibalistic in captivity.

Brachyrhaphis roseni may be kept in a home aquarium, but is known to be aggressive. Captive breeding is challenging because the adults voraciously prey on their own young. The species is fairly common in the ornamental fish trade. Most of the fish traded in Europe come from aquaculture.
