= Lampanyctus intricarius =

Scientific classification
- Kingdom: Animalia
- Phylum: Chordata
- Class: Actinopterygii
- Order: Myctophiformes
- Family: Myctophidae
- Genus: Lampanyctus
- Species: L. intricarius

Binomial name
- Lampanyctus intricarius Tåning, 1928

Species of fish

Lampanyctus intricarius is a species of lanternfish.
