= Twinspot triplefin =

Conservation status
- Vulnerable (IUCN 3.1)

Scientific classification
- Kingdom: Animalia
- Phylum: Chordata
- Class: Actinopterygii
- Order: Blenniiformes
- Family: Tripterygiidae
- Genus: Lepidonectes
- Species: L. bimaculatus

Binomial name
- Lepidonectes bimaculatus Allen & Robertson, 1992

Species of fish

The twinspot triplefin (Lepidonectes bimaculatus) is a species of triplefin blenny in the genus Lepidonectes. It was described by Gerald R. Allen and David Ross Robertson in 1992. This species is found in the eastern Pacific Ocean where it has been recorded only in the vicinity of Malpelo Island in Colombia. The twinspot triplefin acts as a cleaner fish, its only client species being the grouper Epinephelus labriformis.
