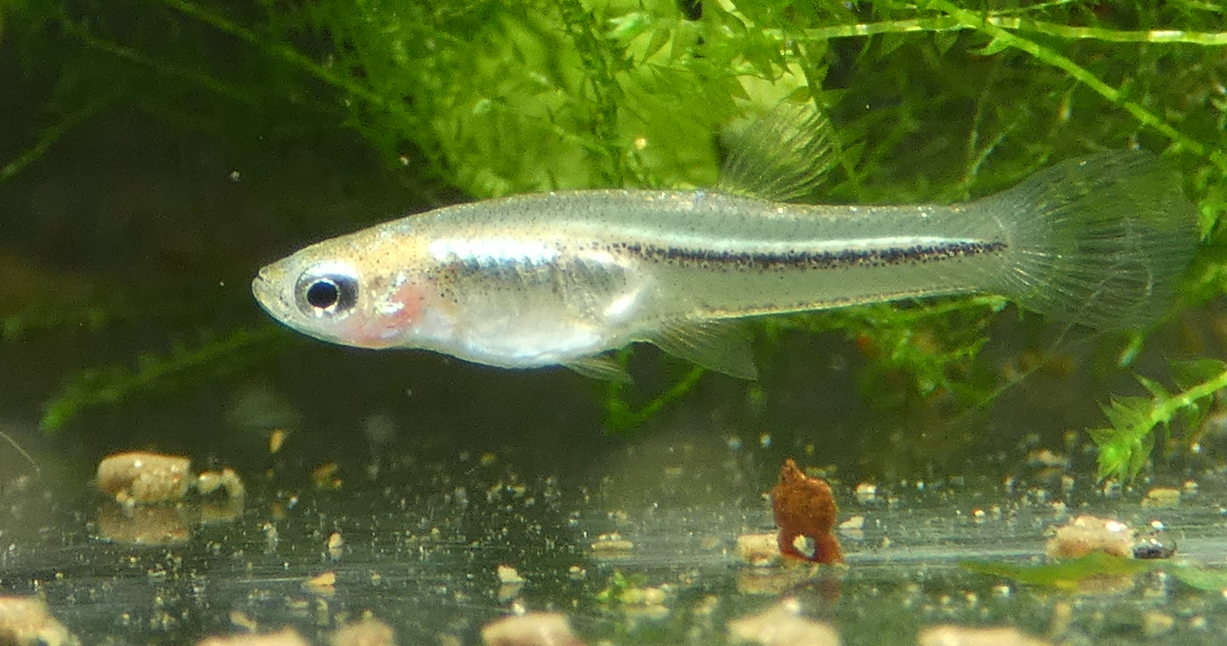

Conservation status
- Least Concern (IUCN 3.1)

Scientific classification
- Kingdom: Animalia
- Phylum: Chordata
- Class: Actinopterygii
- Order: Cyprinodontiformes
- Family: Poeciliidae
- Genus: Poeciliopsis
- Species: P. prolifica

Binomial name
- Poeciliopsis prolifica R. R. Miller, 1960

= Poeciliopsis prolifica =

Species of fish

Poeciliopsis prolifica, or the blackstripe livebearer, is a species of small freshwater fish in the family Poeciliidae. It is endemic to Mexico. It is a viviparous species and the female can have several clutches of young developing internally at the same time, hence the specific name prolifica, from the Latin proles, "offspring" and ferax, "rich, fruitful" in reference to the great number of young produced.

== Description ==
Poeciliopsis prolifica is a small, slender silvery fish growing to a maximum length of about 2 cm (0.8 in) for males and 3.5 cm (1.4 in) for females. Adult males can be told from females by the presence of a gonopodium, an extended rod-shaped anal fin that acts as an intromittent organ to introduce sperm into the female during mating.

== Distribution and habitat ==
The species is endemic to Mexico where it is only found on the eastern side of the Gulf of California, between the states of Sonora and Nayarit. It is a shallow-water, freshwater fish, tolerant of brackish water and found at depths of less than 2 m (7 ft). Its habitat includes streams, brackish lagoons, estuaries and mangrove areas, with sand, mud or gravel bottoms.

== Ecology ==
The diet consists of detritus, zooplankton and tiny arthropods. The family Poeciliidae is known for the fact that the young develop inside the mother. In the case of P. prolifica, the pericardial sac spreads to form a "belly sac" and a follicular placenta is formed inside. Up to five clutches of eggs at different stages of development can be growing in the ovary at the same time, and multiple births can occur more often than in related species that carry a single clutch at a time.

== Status ==
This fish is found in a limited part of Mexico and is very specific in its depth requirements, so it probably occupies a total area of less than 2,000 km^{2} (772 sq mi). Development is taking place along this coast with the loss of mangrove and other suitable habitat, and the International Union for Conservation of Nature has rated its conservation status as being "near threatened".
