= Lampanyctus iselinoides =

Scientific classification
- Kingdom: Animalia
- Phylum: Chordata
- Class: Actinopterygii
- Order: Myctophiformes
- Family: Myctophidae
- Genus: Lampanyctus
- Species: L. iselinoides

Binomial name
- Lampanyctus iselinoides W. A. Bussing, 1965

Species of fish

Lampanyctus iselinoides is a species of lanternfish. They live at a depth of at least 64m.
