= Lampanyctus macropterus =

Scientific classification
- Domain: Eukaryota
- Kingdom: Animalia
- Phylum: Chordata
- Class: Actinopterygii
- Order: Myctophiformes
- Family: Myctophidae
- Genus: Lampanyctus
- Species: L. macropterus

Binomial name
- Lampanyctus macropterus Brauer, 1904

Species of fish

Lampanyctus macropterus is a species of lanternfish.
