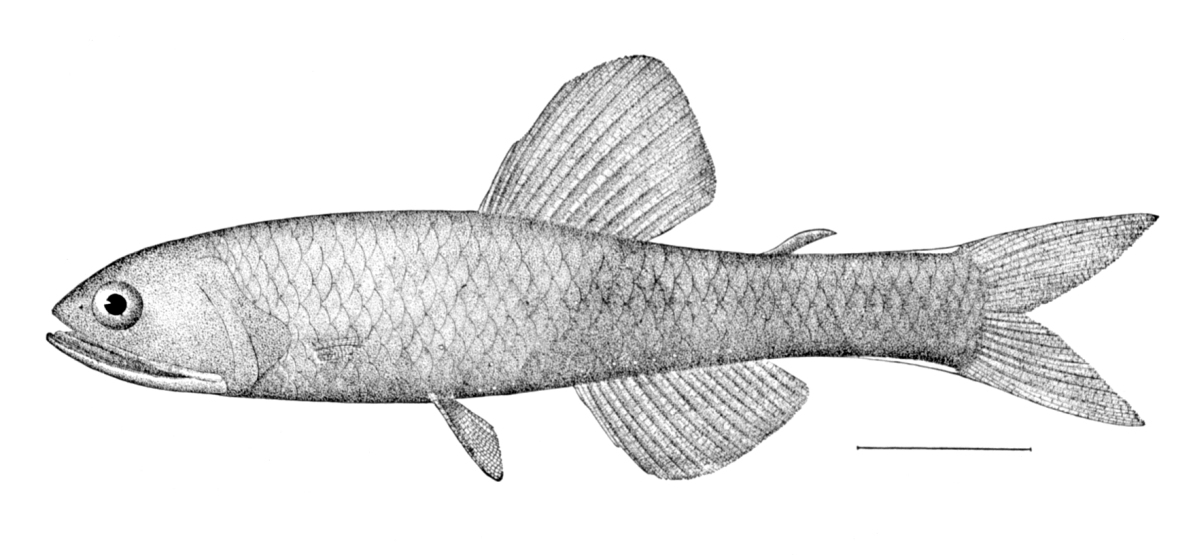

Scientific classification
- Kingdom: Animalia
- Phylum: Chordata
- Class: Actinopterygii
- Order: Myctophiformes
- Family: Myctophidae
- Genus: Lampanyctus
- Species: L. macdonaldi

Binomial name
- Lampanyctus macdonaldi Goode & Bean, 1896

= Lampanyctus macdonaldi =

Species of fish

Lampanyctus macdonaldi is a species of lanternfish.
