= Poeciliopsis lucida =

Conservation status
- Data Deficient (IUCN 3.1)

Scientific classification
- Kingdom: Animalia
- Phylum: Chordata
- Class: Actinopterygii
- Order: Cyprinodontiformes
- Family: Poeciliidae
- Genus: Poeciliopsis
- Species: P. lucida

Binomial name
- Poeciliopsis lucida R. R. Miller, 1960

Species of fish

Poeciliopsis lucida, the clearfin livebearer, is a species of small freshwater fish in the family Poeciliidae. Reproduction is viviparous, and the female can have several clutches of young developing internally at the same time. It is one of several species of small livebearing fish endemic to Mexico that were described in 1960 by the American ichthyologist Robert Rush Miller.

== Description ==
Female Poeciliopsis lucida can grow to a maximum length of about 5 cm (2.0 in) and males to 3 cm (1.2 in).

== Ecology ==
P. lucida is a livebreeder, producing live young in batches. The female can carry three batches of young at a time, each at a different stage of development, and batches are born at an average interval of 10.3 days. Maturity in the female is reached at an age of about eight weeks and a length of about 27 mm (1.06 in). In the laboratory, brother-sister matings have been going on for many years without any sign of diminution of fecundity from inbreeding.

P. lucida can hybridise with Poeciliopsis monacha. When a male P. lucida mates with a female P monacha, the offspring are diploid and are all female. If a male P. lucida mates with these females, the offspring are all female but are triploid. The all-female status is maintained by a process known as hybridogenesis. The sperm is incorporated for a single generation and then excluded during the formation of the ovum. The triploid individual reproduces by gynogenesis, a process triggered by the presence of sperm but not involving gametic fusion.

In the desert streams of Northwestern Mexico, several species of Poeciliopsis are found. In the headwaters of the Fuerte River, the Sinaloa River and the Mocorito River the only species is P. monacha. Further downstream, P. lucida is also present and here the two species hybridise. The dominant P. lucida males tend to mate with their own species but those of lower rank tend to mate with P. monacha, and the triploid hybrid is present throughout the lower reaches of these rivers.

P. monacha are highly cannibalistic and the juvenile fishes tend to hide from their mother close to the substrate. P. lucida is the reverse, and the young swim beside their mother. Hybrids between the two species are intermediate between these two behaviours, with the triploid hybrids being more cannibalistic than the diploid hybrids.
