= Lampanyctus turneri =

Conservation status
- Least Concern (IUCN 3.1)

Scientific classification
- Kingdom: Animalia
- Phylum: Chordata
- Class: Actinopterygii
- Order: Myctophiformes
- Family: Myctophidae
- Genus: Lampanyctus
- Species: L. turneri

Binomial name
- Lampanyctus turneri (Fowler, 1934)

Synonyms
- Serpa turneri Fowler, 1934; Lampanyctus basili Wisner, 1974

Species of fish

Lampanyctus turneri is a species of lanternfish. It is found in the Indian and western Pacific Oceans. It grows to 7 cm (2.8 in) standard length.
