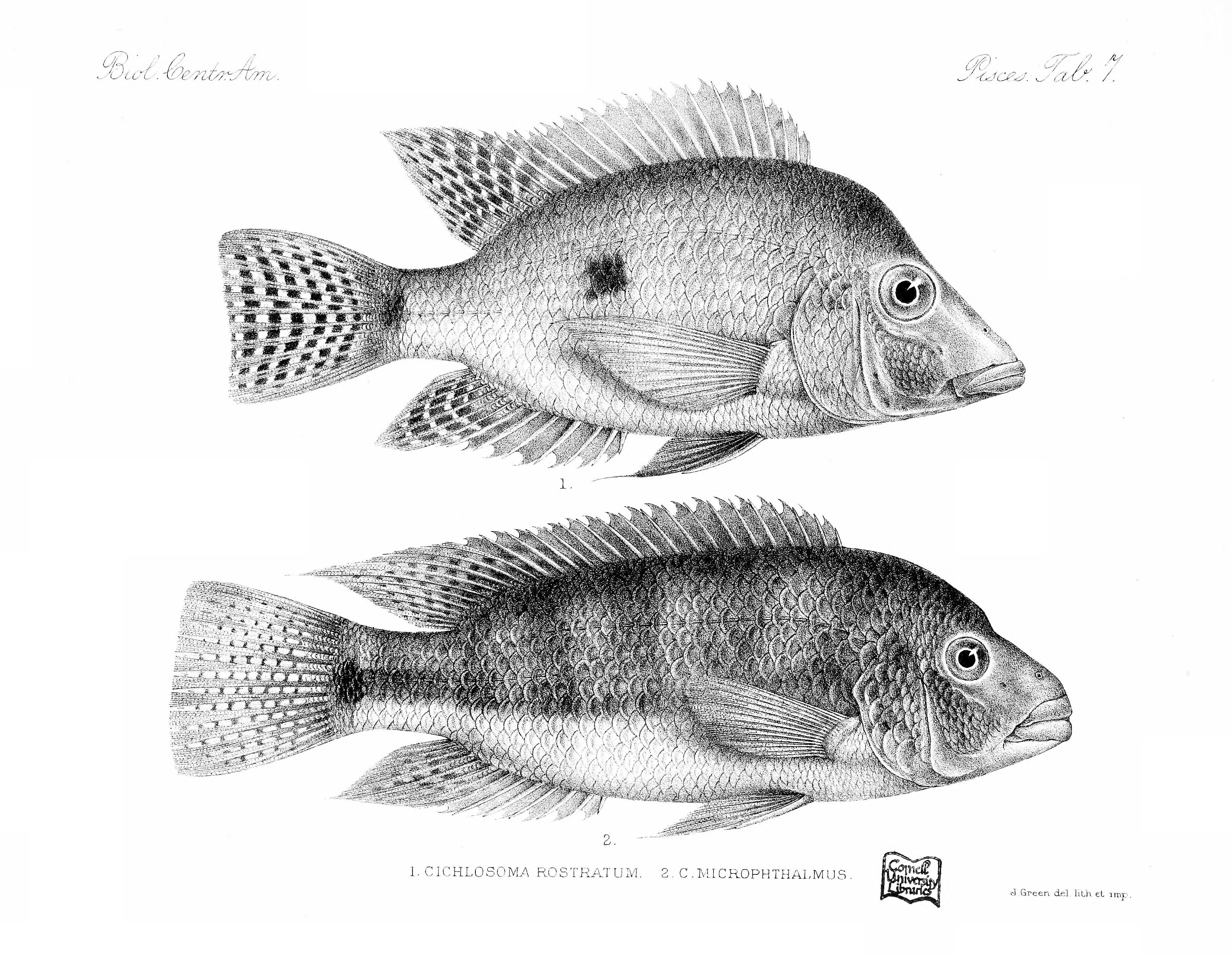
- Cribroheros rostratus above (Chuco microphthalmus below)
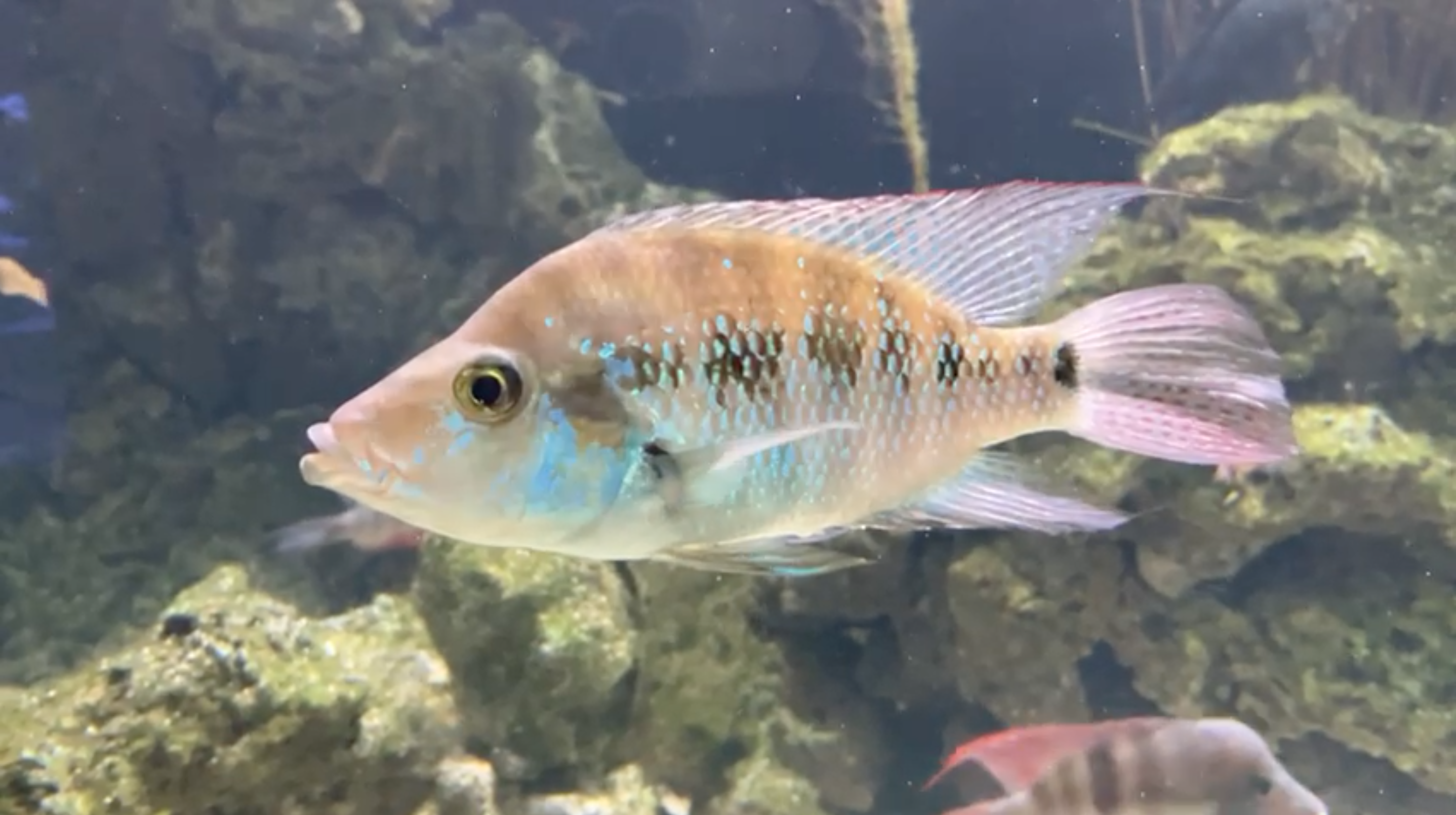
- Cribroheros robertsoni

Scientific classification
- Kingdom: Animalia
- Phylum: Chordata
- Class: Actinopterygii
- Order: Cichliformes
- Family: Cichlidae
- Subfamily: Cichlasomatinae
- Genus: Cribroheros; Říčan & Piálek, 2016

= Cribroheros =

Genus of fishes

Cribroheros is a genus of cichlid found in Middle America. These freshwater fish are distributed over most of Middle America, from western Panama to southern Mexico, on both Atlantic and Pacific slopes. Depending on species, their habitat ranges from fast-flowing rivers and streams, to slow-moving or standing water such as ponds and lakes. Although the genus is overall widespread, the individual species tend to have more restricted distributions and some are threatened, especially due to habitat loss and pollution. They reach up to 19 cm (7.5 in) in standard length.

== Species ==
There are currently 8 recognized species in this genus:

- Cribroheros alfari (Meek, 1907) (Pastel cichlid)
- Cribroheros altifrons (Kner, 1863)
- Cribroheros bussingi (Loiselle, 1997)
- Cribroheros diquis (W. A. Bussing, 1974)
- Cribroheros longimanus (Günther, 1867) (Red-breast cichlid)
- Cribroheros rhytisma (López S., 1983)
- Cribroheros robertsoni (Regan, 1905) (False firemouth cichlid)
- Cribroheros rostratus (T. N. Gill, 1877)
