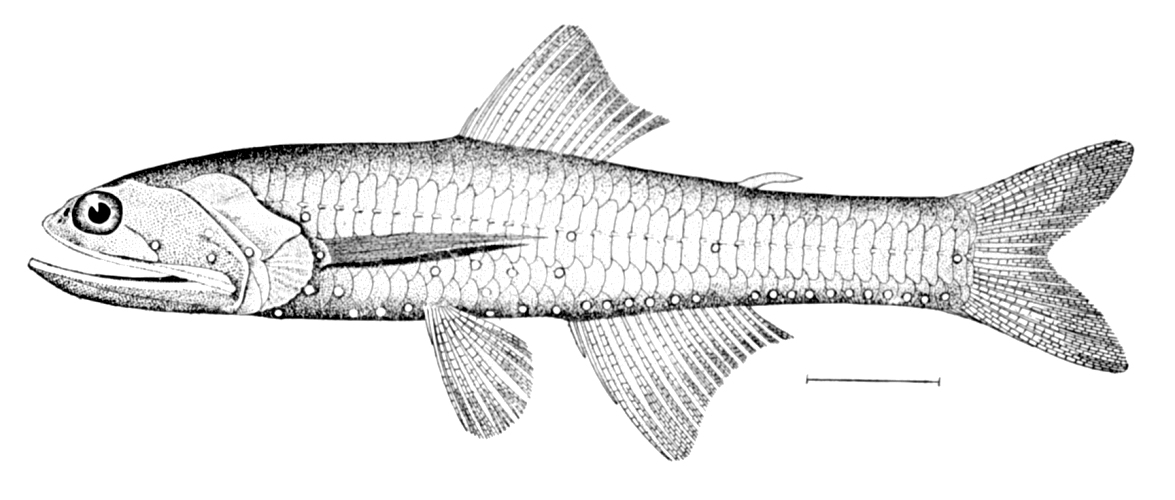
- From Oceanic Ichthyology by G. Brown Goode and Tarleton H. Bean, 1896

Scientific classification
- Kingdom: Animalia
- Phylum: Chordata
- Class: Actinopterygii
- Order: Myctophiformes
- Family: Myctophidae
- Genus: Lampanyctus
- Species: L. crocodilus

Binomial name
- Lampanyctus crocodilus (A. Risso, 1810)

= Lampanyctus crocodilus =

Species of fish

Lampanyctus crocodilus, the jewel lanternfish, is a lanternfish of the family Myctophidae, found in the west Mediterranean Sea and the north Atlantic Ocean (above 50° N). Bathypelagic between 400 and 2000 m.

== Description ==
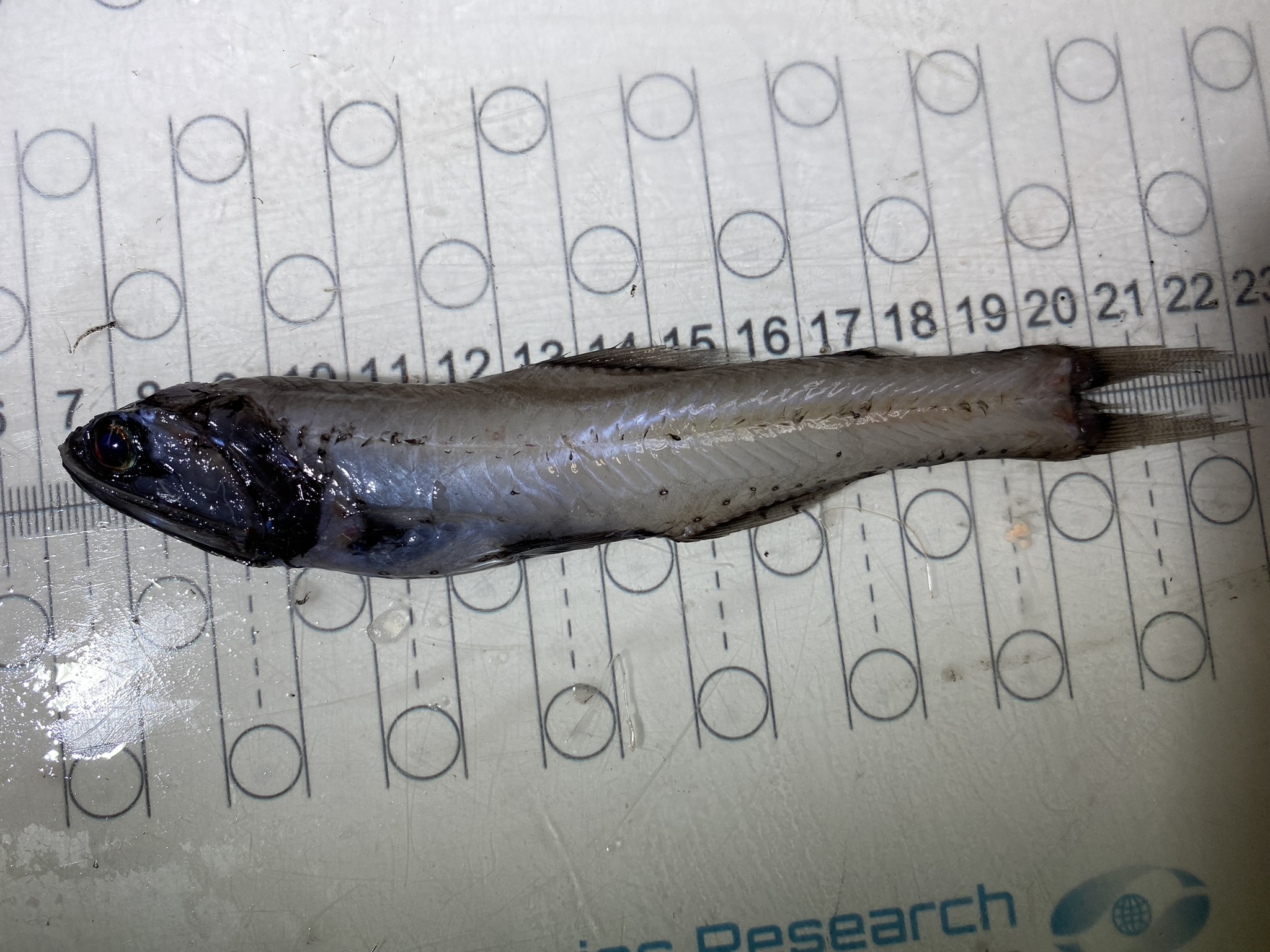
Freshly-caught specimen of L. crocodilus.

This fish can be distinguished from other lanternfish species due to its pattern of photophores and short pectoral fins that can be found behind the gills. It has 13 to 14 total dorsal soft rays and 16 to 18 anal soft rays. Its average length is unknown, but its maximum length is believed to be roughly 30 cm (11.81 in).
