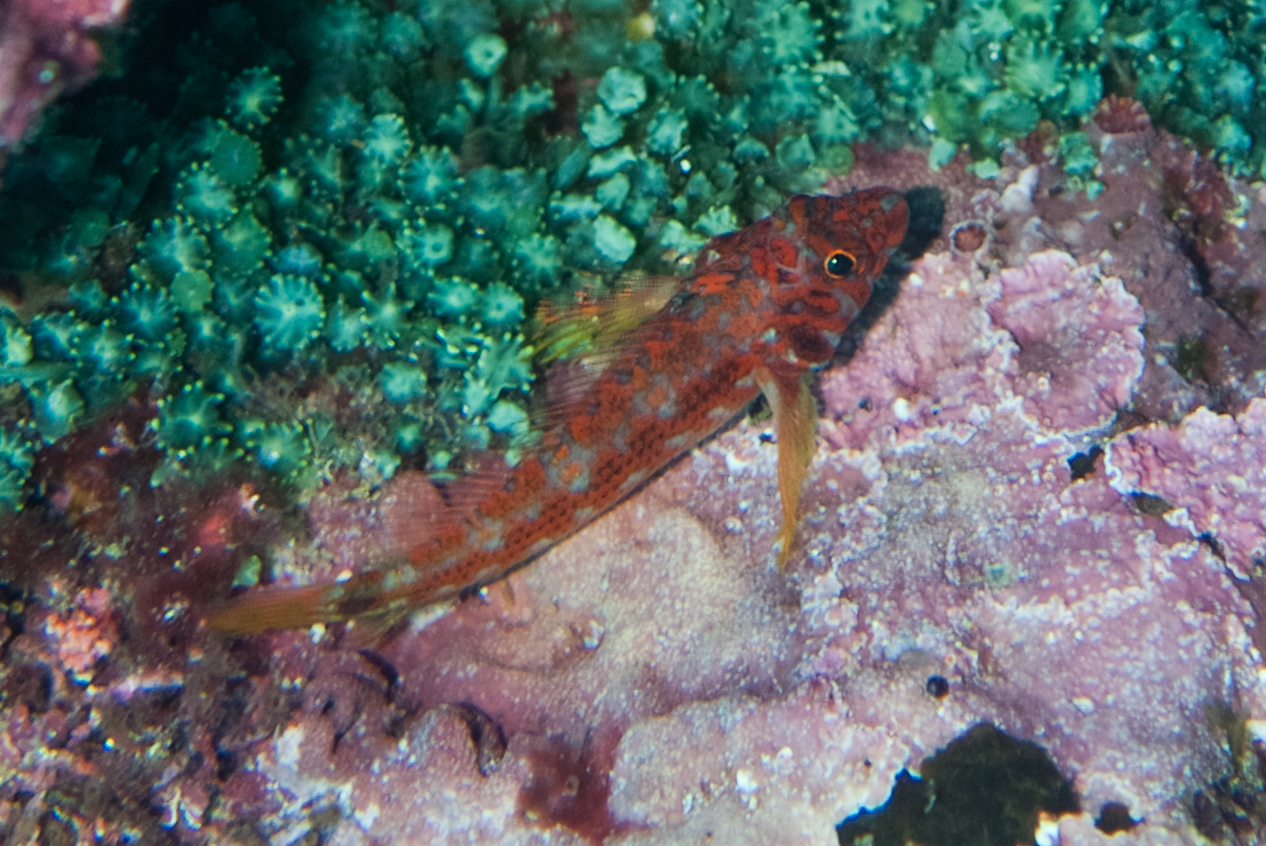

Conservation status
- Vulnerable (IUCN 3.1)

Scientific classification
- Kingdom: Animalia
- Phylum: Chordata
- Class: Actinopterygii
- Order: Blenniiformes
- Family: Tripterygiidae
- Genus: Lepidonectes
- Species: L. corallicola

Binomial name
- Lepidonectes corallicola (Kendall & Radcliffe, 1912)

Synonyms
- Enneapterygius corallicola Kendall & Radcliffe, 1912

= Galapagos triplefin blenny =

Species of fish

The Galapagos triplefin blenny (Lepidonectes corallicola) is a species of triplefin blenny in the genus Lepidonectes. It was described by William Converse Kendall and Lewis Radcliffe in 1912. This species is endemic to the Galapagos Islands. It occurs on rocky slopes and harbour walls where the males hold territories in the breeding season, November to February. These territories are 50 centimetres (20 in) in diameter and the males court females who lay the eggs in his territory and then departs. The male continues to court additional females while guarding the previous female's egg mass from predators. They can be found down to 15 metres (49 ft).
