= Lampanyctus parvicauda =

Scientific classification
- Domain: Eukaryota
- Kingdom: Animalia
- Phylum: Chordata
- Class: Actinopterygii
- Order: Myctophiformes
- Family: Myctophidae
- Genus: Lampanyctus
- Species: L. parvicauda

Binomial name
- Lampanyctus parvicauda Parr, 1931

Species of fish

Lampanyctus parvicauda is a species of lanternfish.
