= Lampanyctus festivus =

Conservation status
- Least Concern (IUCN 3.1)

Scientific classification
- Kingdom: Animalia
- Phylum: Chordata
- Class: Actinopterygii
- Order: Myctophiformes
- Family: Myctophidae
- Genus: Lampanyctus
- Species: L. festivus

Binomial name
- Lampanyctus festivus Tåning, 1928

Synonyms
- Macrostoma festivum (Tåning, 1928); Lampanyctus septilucis Beebe, 1932; Serpa bensoni Fowler, 1934; Lampanyctus bensoni (Fowler, 1934)

Species of fish

Lampanyctus festivus is a species of lanternfish. It is found in the Atlantic, Indian, and Pacific Oceans. It is a mesopelagic fish that undertakes diel vertical migration. It grows to about 14 cm (5.5 in) standard length. It is an important component in the diet of forkbeard Phycis phycis off the Azores.
