= Lampanyctus lepidolychnus =

Scientific classification
- Domain: Eukaryota
- Kingdom: Animalia
- Phylum: Chordata
- Class: Actinopterygii
- Order: Myctophiformes
- Family: Myctophidae
- Genus: Lampanyctus
- Species: L. lepidolychnus

Binomial name
- Lampanyctus lepidolychnus Becker, 1967

Species of fish

Lampanyctus lepidolychnus is a species of lanternfish.
