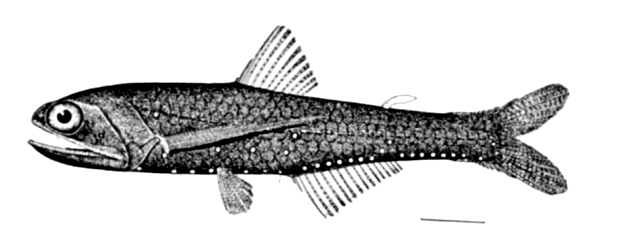

Scientific classification
- Domain: Eukaryota
- Kingdom: Animalia
- Phylum: Chordata
- Class: Actinopterygii
- Order: Myctophiformes
- Family: Myctophidae
- Genus: Lampanyctus
- Species: L. alatus

Binomial name
- Lampanyctus alatus Goode & T. H. Bean, 1896

= Lampanyctus alatus =

Species of fish

Lampanyctus alatus is a species of lanternfish. It is found in parts of the Atlantic, Indian, and Pacific Oceans. It grows to 6.1 cm (2.4 in) standard length.
