= Gymnothorax phalarus =

Conservation status
- Least Concern (IUCN 3.1)

Scientific classification
- Kingdom: Animalia
- Phylum: Chordata
- Class: Actinopterygii
- Order: Anguilliformes
- Family: Muraenidae
- Genus: Gymnothorax
- Species: G. phalarus

Binomial name
- Gymnothorax phalarus W. A. Bussing, 1998

Species of fish

Gymnothorax phalarus is a moray eel found in the eastern Pacific Ocean around Baja California, and along the Pacific coast from Mexico to Peru. It was first named by Bussing in 1998, and can reach a maximum length of 93 cm.
