= Cribroheros diquis =

Conservation status
- Vulnerable (IUCN 3.1)

Scientific classification
- Kingdom: Animalia
- Phylum: Chordata
- Class: Actinopterygii
- Order: Cichliformes
- Family: Cichlidae
- Genus: Cribroheros
- Species: C. diquis

Binomial name
- Cribroheros diquis (Bussing, 1974)

Synonyms
- Cichlasoma diquis Bussing, 1974; Astatheros diquis; Amphilophus diquis

Species of fish

Cribroheros diquis is a species of freshwater cichlid fish in the family Cichlidae, native and endemic to Costa Rica on the Pacific slope of the country's southeastern region. It is one of the recognized species in the genus Cribroheros, a group of Middle American cichlids.

== Taxonomy and nomenclature ==
Cribroheros diquis was originally described in 1974 by ichthyologist William A. Bussing under the name Cichlasoma diquis, based on specimens from Pacific-draining rivers in southeastern Costa Rica. Subsequent taxonomic revisions have placed it in several genera, including Astatheros and Amphilophus, before its current placement in Cribroheros.

== Description ==
Cribroheros diquis is a moderately sized cichlid, typically reaching about 11–14 cm in total length. It has a light straw-colored body with irregular darker bands dorsally and a pointed, robust snout. The dorsal fin may show a subtle reddish margin. It closely resembles Cribroheros alfari but can be differentiated by its paler coloration and a distinct dark spot beneath the pectoral fins.

== Distribution and habitat ==
This species is restricted to Pacific-draining river systems in southeastern Costa Rica, including river basins in the Puntarenas region and adjacent southern Pacific watersheds at elevations from about 16 to 700 m above sea level. It inhabits moderately to slowly flowing freshwater environments with sandy or muddy substrates.

== Ecology and behaviour ==
Cribroheros diquis is a benthopelagic sand-sifter, feeding by sifting organic materials and benthic invertebrates from the substrate. Its diet consists of small worms, crustaceans, insect larvae, snails, and detritus.
