= Signal triplefin =

Conservation status
- Least Concern (IUCN 3.1)

Scientific classification
- Kingdom: Animalia
- Phylum: Chordata
- Class: Actinopterygii
- Order: Blenniiformes
- Family: Tripterygiidae
- Genus: Lepidonectes
- Species: L. clarkhubbsi

Binomial name
- Lepidonectes clarkhubbsi W. A. Bussing, 1991

Species of fish

The signal triplefin (Lepidonectes clarkhubbsi) is a species of triplefin blenny in the genus Lepidonectes. It was described by William Albert Bussing in 1991 and he gave it a specific name which honours the American ichthyologist Clark Hubbs (1921–2008). This species occurs in the eastern Pacific Ocean where it is found off Costa Rica and Panama. The signal triplefin is found on rocky shores where it feeds on very small invertebrates and algae.
