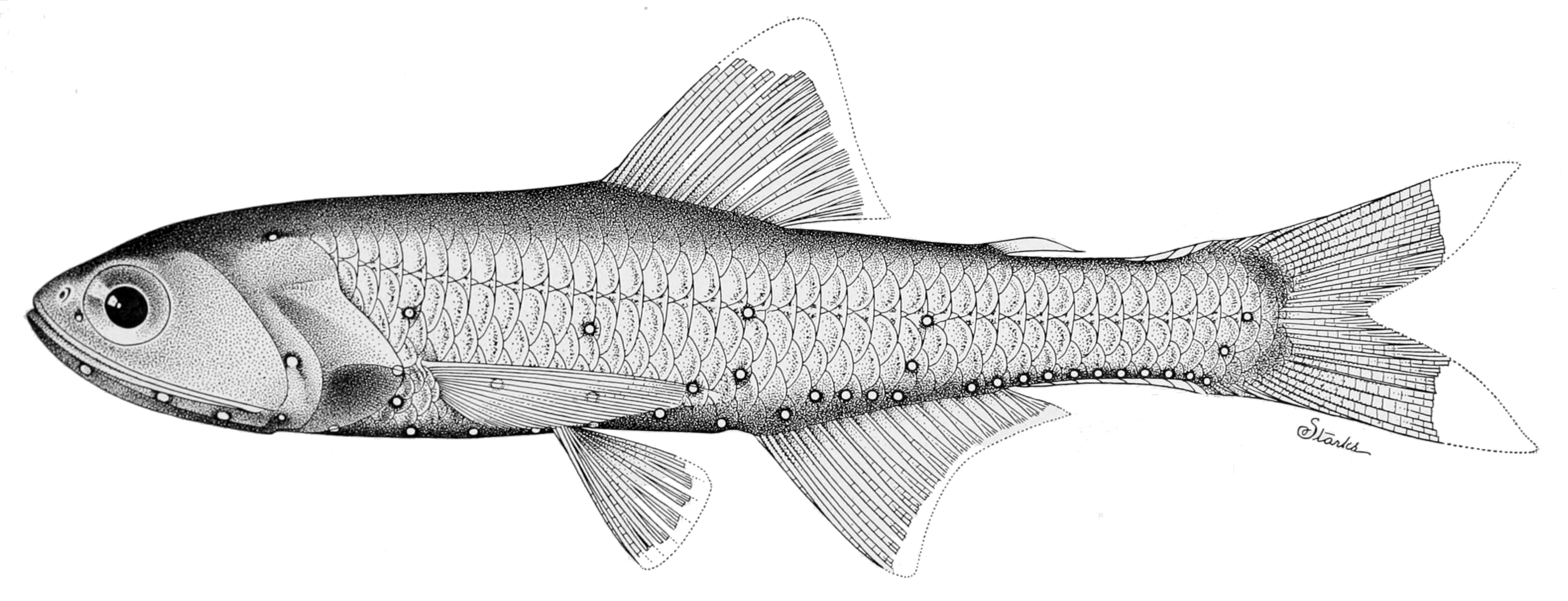

Scientific classification
- Domain: Eukaryota
- Kingdom: Animalia
- Phylum: Chordata
- Class: Actinopterygii
- Order: Myctophiformes
- Family: Myctophidae
- Genus: Lampanyctus
- Species: L. omostigma

Binomial name
- Lampanyctus omostigma Gilbert, 1908

= Lampanyctus omostigma =

Species of fish

Lampanyctus omostigma is a species of lanternfish.
