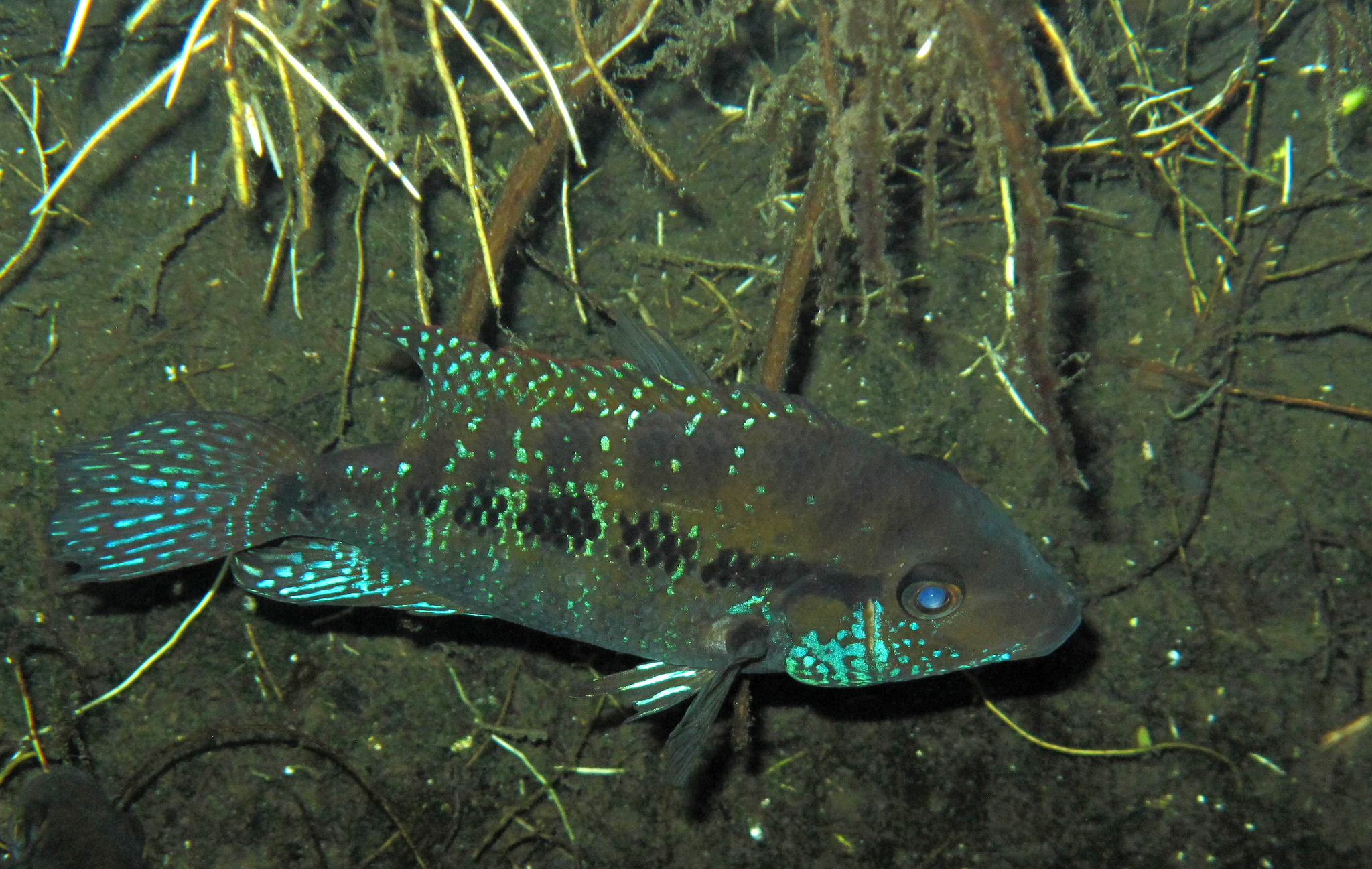
- Cribroheros robertsoni in Tulum, Mexico

Conservation status
- Least Concern (IUCN 3.1)

Scientific classification
- Kingdom: Animalia
- Phylum: Chordata
- Class: Actinopterygii
- Order: Cichliformes
- Family: Cichlidae
- Genus: Cribroheros
- Species: C. robertsoni

Binomial name
- Cribroheros robertsoni (Regan, 1905)

Synonyms
- Cichlosoma robertsoni Regan, 1905; Amphilophus robertsoni (Regan, 1905); Cichlasoma robertsoni Regan, 1905; Cichlasoma acutum Miller, 1907

= Cribroheros robertsoni =

Species of fish

Cribroheros robertsoni, also known as the false firemouth cichlid, is a species of cichlid found in Central America in the Atlantic slope from Mexico to Honduras in the Coatzacoalcos River.

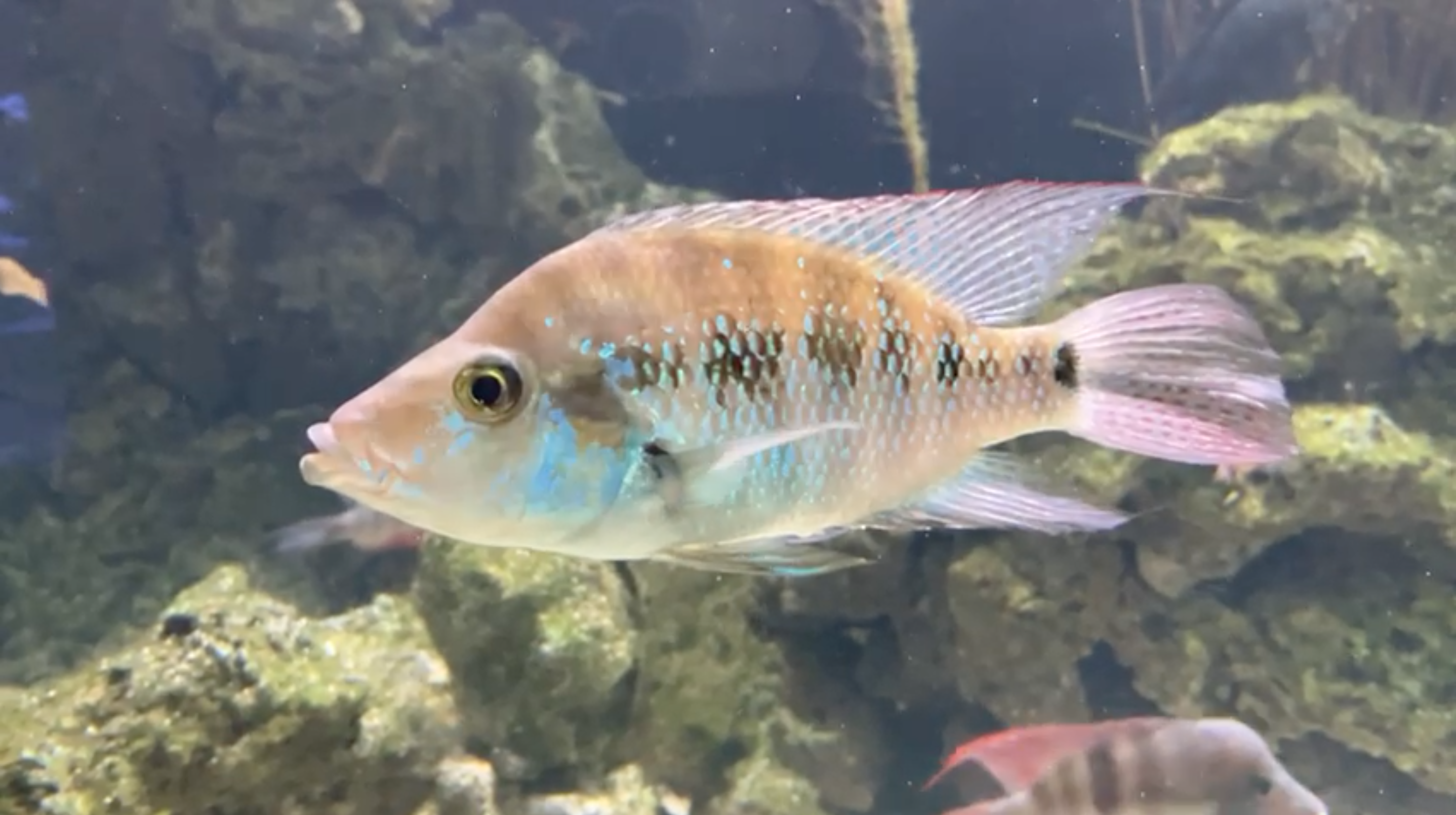
At the Vancouver Aquarium
