= Lampanyctus nobilis =

Scientific classification
- Kingdom: Animalia
- Phylum: Chordata
- Class: Actinopterygii
- Order: Myctophiformes
- Family: Myctophidae
- Genus: Lampanyctus
- Species: L. nobilis

Binomial name
- Lampanyctus nobilis Tåning, 1928

Species of fish

Lampanyctus nobilis, the noble lampfish, is a species of lanternfish.
