= Lampanyctus steinbecki =

Scientific classification
- Kingdom: Animalia
- Phylum: Chordata
- Class: Actinopterygii
- Order: Myctophiformes
- Family: Myctophidae
- Genus: Lampanyctus
- Species: L. steinbecki

Binomial name
- Lampanyctus steinbecki Bolin, 1939

Species of fish

Lampanyctus steinbecki is a species of lanternfish.
