= Lampanyctus photonotus =

Scientific classification
- Domain: Eukaryota
- Kingdom: Animalia
- Phylum: Chordata
- Class: Actinopterygii
- Order: Myctophiformes
- Family: Myctophidae
- Genus: Lampanyctus
- Species: L. photonotus

Binomial name
- Lampanyctus photonotus Parr, 1928

Species of fish

Lampanyctus photonotus is a species of lanternfish.
