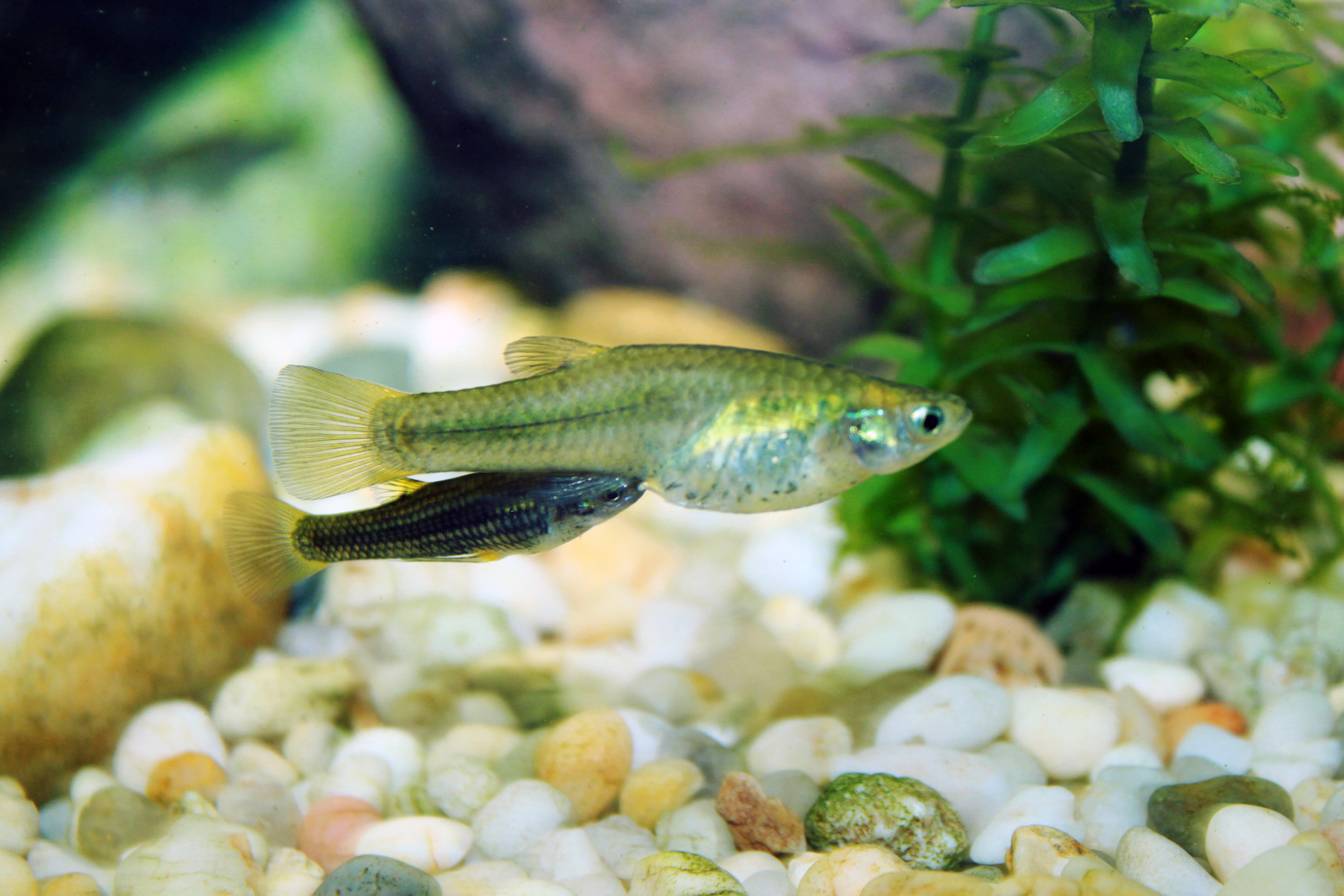
- Gila topminnow (P. occidentalis)

Scientific classification
- Kingdom: Animalia
- Phylum: Chordata
- Class: Actinopterygii
- Division: Teleostei
- Order: Cyprinodontiformes
- Family: Poeciliidae
- Tribe: Heterandriini
- Genus: Poeciliopsis; Regan, 1913

Type species
- Poecilia presidionis D. S. Jordan & Culver, 1895

= Poeciliopsis =

Genus of fishes

Poeciliopsis is a genus of poeciliid fishes that primarily are native to Mexico and Central America. The only exceptions are P. turrubarensis where the range extends into Colombia, and P. occidentalis where the range extends into Arizona and New Mexico.

== Species ==
There are currently 24 recognized species in this genus:

- Poeciliopsis baenschi (M. K. Meyer, Radda, Riehl & Feichtinger, 1986) (Golden livebearer)
- Poeciliopsis balsas (C. L. Hubbs, 1926) (Balsas livebearer)
- Poeciliopsis catemaco (R. R. Miller, 1975) (Catemaco livebearer)
- Poeciliopsis elongata (Günther, 1866) (Elongate toothcarp)
- Poeciliopsis fasciata (Meek, 1904) (San Jeronimo livebearer)
- Poeciliopsis gracilis (Heckel, 1848) (Porthole livebearer)
- Poeciliopsis hnilickai (M. K. Meyer & Vogel, 1981) (Upper Grijalva livebearer)
- Poeciliopsis infans (Woolman, 1894) (Lerma livebearer)
- Poeciliopsis jackschultzi Kevin Conway, Mariana Mateos and Robert C. Vrijenhoek, 2019 (Jack Schultzi's livebearer)
- Poeciliopsis latidens (Garman, 1895) (Lowland livebearer)
- Poeciliopsis lucida (R. R. Miller, 1960) (Clearfin livebearer)
- Poeciliopsis lutzi (Meek, 1902) (Oaxaca livebearer)
- Poeciliopsis monacha (R. R. Miller, 1960) (Headwater livebearer)
- Poeciliopsis occidentalis (S. F. Baird & Girard, 1853) (Gila topminnow)
- Poeciliopsis paucimaculata (W. A. Bussing, 1967)
- Poeciliopsis pleurospilus (Günther, 1866) (Largespot livebearer)
- Poeciliopsis presidionis (D. S. Jordan & Culver, 1895) (Sinaloa livebearer)
- Poeciliopsis prolifica (R. R. Miller, 1960) (Blackstripe livebearer)
- Poeciliopsis retropinna (Regan, 1908)
- Poeciliopsis santaelena (W. A. Bussing, 2008)
- Poeciliopsis scarlli (M. K. Meyer, Riehl, Dawes & Dibble, 1985) (Michoacan livebearer)
- Poeciliopsis sonoriensis (Girard, 1859) (Sonora topminnow)
- Poeciliopsis turneri (R. R. Miller, 1975) (Blackspotted livebearer)
- Poeciliopsis turrubarensis (Meek, 1912)
- Poeciliopsis viriosa (R. R. Miller, 1960) (Chubby livebearer)

== Hybrid species ==
Poeciliopsis monacha-occidentalis is a unisexual (all female) hybridogenic lineage. It is an ancient clonal lineage that appears to be more than 100,000 generations old. The maternal ancestor was P. monacha and the paternal ancestor was P. occidentalis.
