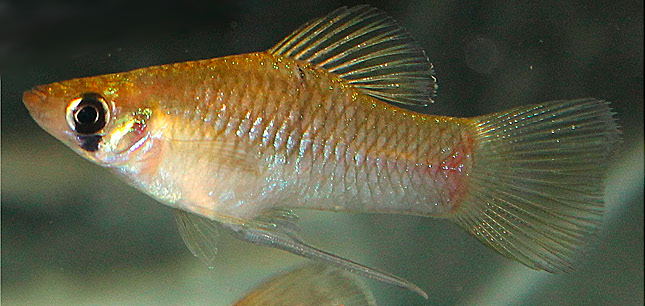
- A male
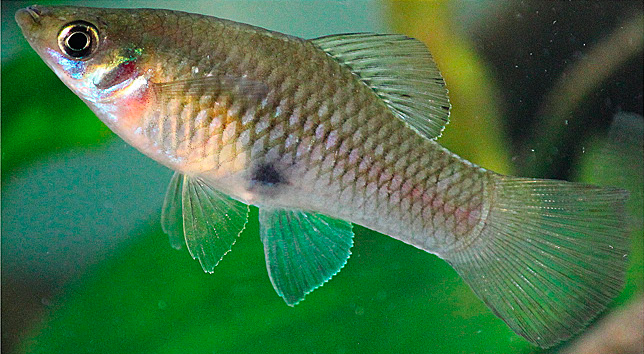
- A female

Conservation status
- Least Concern (IUCN 3.1)

Scientific classification
- Kingdom: Animalia
- Phylum: Chordata
- Class: Actinopterygii
- Order: Cyprinodontiformes
- Family: Poeciliidae
- Genus: Phallichthys
- Species: P. amates

Binomial name
- Phallichthys amates R. R. Miller, 1907

Synonyms
- Poeciliopsis isthmensis

= Phallichthys amates =

Merry widow livebearer

Species of fish

Phallichthys amates, the merry widow or merry widow livebearer, is a livebearer fish from Central America, the largest and most widespread in its genus. Two subspecies range from Guatemala to Panama. Distinguishing features include the dark dorsal fin edge, a stripe through the eye, and an oversized male copulatory organ (gonopodium).

== Taxonomy ==
Phallichthys amates is the largest and most widespread species in the genus Phallichthys. It was originally thought to consist of three species, P. amates from the Motagua River in Guatemala, P. pittieri from the Reventazon River in Costa Rica, and P. isthmensis from Colón, Panama. Today, these populations are considered to comprise a single species, P. amates, with two generally recognized subspecies:

- P. amates amates (Miller, 1907)
- P. amates pittieri (Meek, 1912)

While the genus name literally means "phallus fish", referring to the male's strikingly large copulatory organ (gonopodium), the common name for the species, merry widow, was invented by William T. Innes's friend and fishkeeping author Frederick H. Stoye due to the fish's "lively habits, plus the mourning [black] edge on the dorsal fin". German-born Stoye may have been further inspired by the then-popular Austrian opera The Merry Widow.

== Description ==
Phallichthys amates has a robust and deep, almost rhomboid grey body with bluish highlights. A black stripe through the eye runs to the throat. Juveniles and adult males possess six to eight vertical bars, which are softened or missing in adult females. The male's gonopodium reaches the base of the caudal fin. The dorsal fin is always erect in both sexes.

P. amates amates is the larger subspecies, characterized by a black band along the edge of its dorsal fin. Females grow to 2.5 in (64 mm), while males only reach the length of 1.25 in (32 mm). P. amates pittieri, about 0.25 in (6.4 mm) shorter, instead possesses an orange or orange-red band with a dark grey band inside it and more often has scales edged in a reticulated pattern. Some fish in the Patuca River drainage in Honduras exhibit intermediate characteristics.

== Distribution and habitat ==
Phallichthys amates amates occurs on the Atlantic slope from Guatemala's Motagua River to the rivers close to the La Ceiba municipality in Honduras. P. amates pittier is found from northern Nicaragua to the Guarumo River in western Panama. The species is seldom encountered in the Atlantic slope and north of Costa Rica, where it is found scattered in the Tempisque and Bebedero drainages. Meek did not record it in Costa Rican Central Valley in 1914 but Alfaro found it there in 1928, suggesting an introduction by human between those dates.

The preferred habitats are shallow waters of swamps, creeks, and river shorelines over soft bottoms such as mud and leaf litter. Temperatures in these habitats range from 20 to 37 °C.

== Diet ==
Phallichthys amates feeds mainly on detritus, ooze, and diatoms. Filamentous algae and aquatic insects are occasionally taken as well.

== Reproduction ==
Phallichthys amates reproduces throughout the year but a greater number of juveniles is found in September. A livebearer, the female gives birth to 10–80 live fry, the number depending on the female's size. The gestation lasts about four weeks or less, depending on water temperature. The fry are born looking exactly like adult fish, including the characteristic band on the dorsal fin.

== Aquarium husbandry ==
Though uncommon in the hobby, Phallichthys amates is easy to keep in a home aquarium. Like other Phallichthys species, it is hardy, peaceful, and outgoing.
