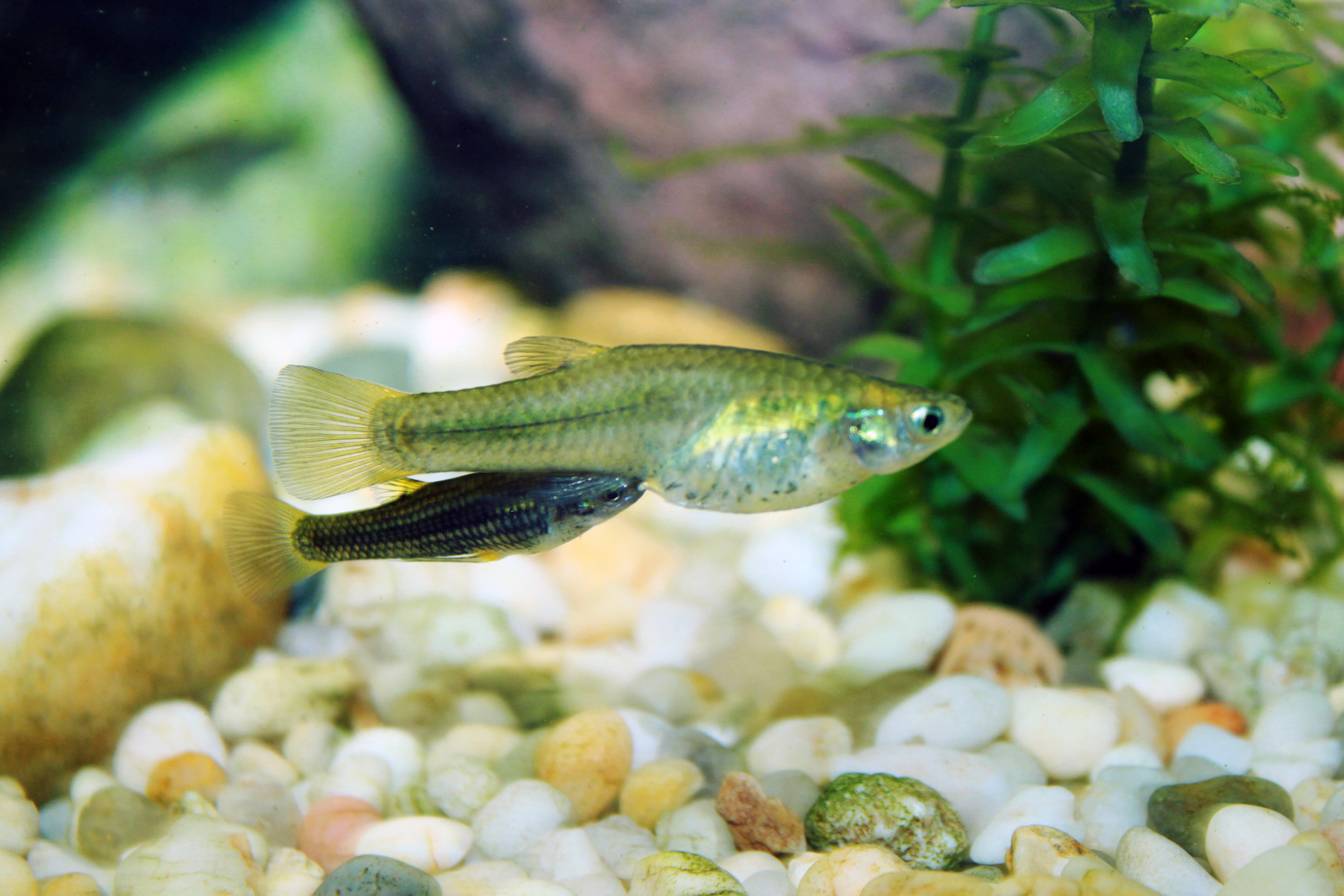

Conservation status
- Least Concern (IUCN 3.1)

- Vulnerable (NatureServe)

Scientific classification
- Kingdom: Animalia
- Phylum: Chordata
- Class: Actinopterygii
- Division: Teleostei
- Order: Cyprinodontiformes
- Family: Poeciliidae
- Genus: Poeciliopsis
- Species: P. occidentalis

Binomial name
- Poeciliopsis occidentalis (S. F. Baird & Girard, 1853)

Synonyms
- Heterandria occidentalis S.F. Baird & Girard, 1853

= Gila topminnow =

Species of fish

The Gila topminnow or charalito (Poeciliopsis occidentalis) is a species of fish in the family Poeciliidae found in Mexico and the United States.

== Description ==
The Gila topminnow has an elongated, curved body. Males are rarely over 25 mm (0.98 in) and they are smaller than females, which can sometimes be 50 mm (2.0 in). The belly is often white with darker body above, has scales with dark outlines, and a lateral dark band on the side.

== Distribution ==
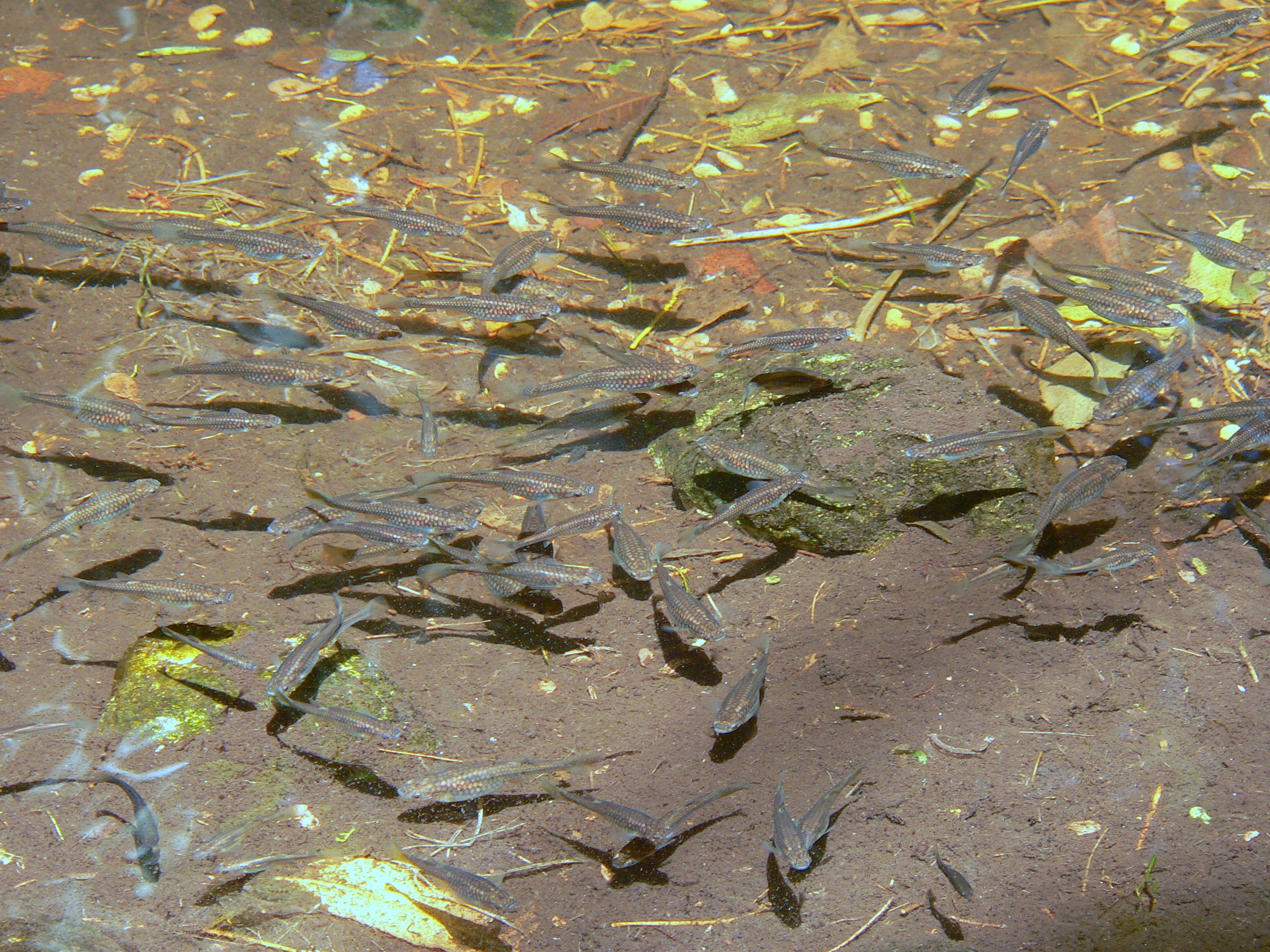
School of topminnows—taken at the Arizona-Sonora Desert Museum in Tucson

Gila topminnow once occupied in the Gila River drainage in Arizona, New Mexico, and Mexico. Currently, they are known to be in Gila River drainage in Arizona and Mexico, having been extirpated from New Mexico due to the introduction of Gambusia affinis.

== Biology ==
Gila topminnow was once the most common fish found in the Gila River drainage. They are fertilized internally; reproduction season usually is from April to November. The female gives birth from 10 to 15 young per brood. These young brood reach maturity in a few weeks to several months. Gila topminnows are omnivorous, and eat food such as detritus and amphipod crustaceans, but feed mostly on aquatic insect larvae, especially mosquitos.

== Habitat ==
This species of fish prefers to live in shallow, warm water in headwater springs. They can survive in water with temperatures ranging from near freezing to near 100 °F (38 °C). They can also live in water with a pH range from 6.6 – 8.9 and salinity from fresh water to sea water.

== Conservation ==
Gila topminnows are endangered due to predation and competition from the introduced mosquitofish. Threats also come from continued habitat loss due to water development, habitat degradation due to erosion from roads, and drought. Gila topminnows from Sharp Spring currently are being held and bred at Southwestern Native Aquatic Resources and Recovery Center at Dexter, New Mexico, for reintroduction to wild habitats.
