= William Bussing =

American ichthyologist (1933–2014)

- Born: September 27, 1933; Los Angeles, California, U.S.
- Died: November 17, 2014 (aged 81); San Jose, Costa Rica
- Education: University of Southern California
- Scientific career
- Fields: Ichthyology
- Workplaces: Universidad de Costa Rica

William Albert Bussing (September 27, 1933 - November 17, 2014), known as Don William, was an American ichthyologist who spent most of his career on the faculty of the Universidad de Costa Rica, working there from 1966 to 1991. He was appointed professor in 1978 and when he retired he became emeritus professor.

== Early life ==
Bussing was born in Los Angeles, California. His university education was interrupted by his conscription to serve in the Korean War and by other jobs, he graduated with a Bachelor of Arts from the University of Southern California in 1960, and teaching degree in 1961.

== Career ==
Following his graduation, Bussing obtained an Inter-American Cultural Convention scholarship and travelled to Costa Rica to carry out research on the ecology of fishes of the Río Puerto Viejo, Sarapiquí in Costa Rica. One result of this research was the description of a new species, Phallichthys tico in his first paper published in 1963, the first of over 90 publications. He taught a course in ichthyology at the Universidad de Costa Rica in 1962 and from 1963 and 1965 he worked towards his Masters on the bathypelagic fishes found off the coasts of Peru and Chile. In 1965 he became an assistant researching fish herbivory around Enewetak Atoll. He returned to Universidad de Costa Rica in 1966 to teach biology. In 1968 he was a co-founder of the Universidad de Costa Rica's Museo de Zoología.

In 1990 he was appointed by the Food and Agriculture Organization to study the distribution of fishes on the Pacific slope of Mesoamerica and Colombia, this work being published in many FAO guides to the commercially exploited fishes of the region. In all he wrote over 90 papers, a number of books and described around 60 new species. Bussing described more new species of vertebrate than any other zoologist working on Costa Rica. He undertook most expeditions with his wife, Myrna López, published some works with her too, and dedicated species to her and their children, Ilse and Erick.

== Selected publications ==
- (1963). A new poeciliid fish, Phallichthys tico from Costa Rica. Contributions in Science (Los Angeles), No. 77, 1–13.
- (1965). Biology of the Antarctic Seas 2. Studies of the midwater fishes of the Peru-Chile Trench. Antarctic Research Series, 5, 185–227.

== Taxa described by him ==
- Phallichthys tico, Family Poeciliidae
- Binghamichthys aphos, Family Alepocephalidae
- Lampanyctus iselinoides, Family Myctophidae
- Melanostigma bathium, Family Zoarcidae
- Benthalbella macropinna, Family Scopelarchidae
- Brachyrhaphis holdridgei, Family Poeciliidae
- Hyphessobrycon savagei, Family Characidae
- Piabucina boruca, Family Lebiasininae
- Poeciliopsis paucimaculata, Family Poeciliidae
- Pseudocheirodon terrabae, Family Characidae
- Nannorhamdia lineata, Family Heptapteridae
- Imparales panamensis, Family Heptapteridae
- Halichoeres aestuaricola, Family Labridae
- Cichlasoma diquis, Family Cichlidae
- Cichlasoma sajica, Family Cichlidae
- Pterobrycon myrnae, Family Characidae
- Melaniris hubbsi, Family Atherinopsidae
- Melaniris jiloaensis, Family Atherinopsidae
- Melaniris milleri, Family Atherinopsidae
- Phallichthys quadripunctatus, Family Poeciliidae
- Rivulus fuscolineatus, Family Rivulidae
- Rivulus glaucus, Family Rivulidae
- Rivulus rubripunctatus, Family Rivulidae
- Rivulus siegfriedi, Family Rivulidae
- Rivulus uroflammeus, Family Rivulidae
- Liopropoma fasciatum, Family Serranidae
- Elacatinus janssi, Family Gobiidae
- Halichoeres discolor, Family Labridae
- Evermannia erici, Family Gobiidae
- Roeboides ilseae, Family Characidae
- Brachyrhaphis roseni, Family Poeciliidae
- Cichlasoma loisellei, Family Cichlidae
- Chriolepis dialepta, Family Gobiidae
- Chriolepis cuneata, Family Gobiidae
- Elacatinus inornatus, Family Gobiidae
- Elacatinus nesiotes, Family Gobiidae
- Lythrypnus alphigena, Family Gobiidae
- Lythrypnus cobalus, Family Gobiidae
- Lythrypnus insularis, Family Gobiidae
- Lythrypnus lavenbergi, Family Gobiidae
- Axoclinus cocoensis, Family Tripterygiidae
- Lepidonectes clarkhubbsi, Family Tripterygiidae
- Uropterygius versutus, Family Muraenidae
- Pomadasys empherus, Family Haemulidae
- Eleotris tecta, Family Eleotridae
- Sicydium adelum, Family Gobiidae
- Sphoeroides rosenblatti, Family Tetraodontidae
- Chriolepis atrimelum, Family Gobiidae
- Gymnothorax phalarus, Family Muraenidae
- Urotrygon cimar, Family Urotrygonidae
- Ptereleotris carinata, Family Microdesmidae
- Opistognathus brochus, Family Opistognathidae
- Opistognathus fossoris, Family Opistognathidae
- Opistognathus smithvanizi, Family Opistognathidae
- Opistognathus walkeri, Family Opistognathidae
- Poeciliopsis santaelena, Family Poeciliidae
- Astyanax cocibolca, Family Characidae
- Peristedion nesium, Family Peristediidae
- Chimaera orientalis, Family Chimaeridae
- Urobatis pardalis, Family Urotrygonidae
- Also see Category:Taxa named by William Bussing

== Death ==
Bussing died in San Jose, Costa Rica, on November 17, 2014, of injuries sustained in a car accident.

== Taxon named in his honor ==
- Platygillellus bussingi, Family Dactyloscopidae, Bussing's stargazer, is a species of sand stargazer native to the Pacific coast of Costa Rica and Panama where it can be found on sandy bottoms at depths of from 1 to 15 metres (3.3 to 49.2 ft). It can reach a maximum length of 5 centimetres (2.0 in) TL.
- Umbrina bussingi, Family Sciaenidae
- Talismania bussingi, Family Alepocephalidae
- Amphilophus bussingi, Family Cichlidae
- Gunterichthys bussingi, Family Bythitidae
- Roeboides bussingi, Family Characidae
