= Limia grossidens =

Largetooth limia

Conservation status
- Critically Endangered (IUCN 3.1)

Scientific classification
- Kingdom: Animalia
- Phylum: Chordata
- Class: Actinopterygii
- Order: Cyprinodontiformes
- Family: Poeciliidae
- Genus: Limia
- Species: L. grossidens

Binomial name
- Limia grossidens Rivas, 1980

Species of fish

Limia grossidens, also called the largetooth limia, is a critically endangered poeciliid fish endemic to Haiti.

L. grossidens was described by Luis R. Rivas in 1980 along with seven other new Limia species (L. fuscomaculata, L. garnieri, L. immaculata, L. miragoanensis, L. pauciradiata, L. sulphurophila, and L. yaguajali) and made the type species of the newly erected subgenus Odontolimia. Odontolimia are characterized by their large conical teeth. The teeth of L grossidens are larger than in any other Limia species, which is reflected in both their scientific and common name.

The maximum reported standard lengths are 49.2 mm (1.94 in) for females and 48.2 mm (1.90 in) for males.

L. grossidens is known solely from the coastal freshwater Lake Miragoane in south-western Haiti and is apparently endemic to it. There it shares its habitat with five other Odontolimia species (L. ornata, L. fuscomaculata, L. garnieri, L. immaculata, and L. miragoanensis) as well as with L. nigrofasciata.

L. grossidens is listed by the IUCN Red List as Critically Endangered. The species' survival is threatened primarily by deforestation, which is a major problem in Haiti; pollution; invasive species (including tilapias Oreochromis aureus and Coptodon rendalli and the common carp Cyprinus carpio); and climate change-induced flooding.
