= Limia fuscomaculata =

Blotched limia

Conservation status
- Critically Endangered (IUCN 3.1)

Scientific classification
- Kingdom: Animalia
- Phylum: Chordata
- Class: Actinopterygii
- Order: Cyprinodontiformes
- Family: Poeciliidae
- Genus: Limia
- Species: L. fuscomaculata

Binomial name
- Limia fuscomaculata Rivas, 1980

Species of fish

Limia fuscomaculata, also called the blotched limia, is a critically endangered poeciliid fish endemic to Haiti.

L. fuscomaculata was described by Luis R. Rivas in 1980 along with seven other new Limia species (L. grossidens, L. garnieri, L. immaculata, L. pauciradiata, L. miragoanensis, L. sulphurophila, and L. yaguajali) and made part of the newly erected subgenus Odontolimia. Odontolimia are characterized by their large conical teeth. The sides of the body are covered by dark spots and blotches, and this unique trait is reflected in both the scientific and the proposed vernacular name of the species.

The maximum reported standard length is 3.9 cm (1.5 in) (a female specimen).

L. fuscomaculata is known exclusively from the coastal freshwater Lake Miragoane in south-western Haiti and is apparently endemic to it. The lake is simultaneously home to five other Odontolimia species (L. ornata, L. grossidens, L. garnieri, L. immaculata, and L. miragoanensis) as well as to L. nigrofasciata.

L. fuscomaculata is critically endangered due to deforestation, which is a major problem in Haiti; water pollution; the spread of invasive species such as the tilapias Oreochromis aureus and Coptodon rendalli and the common carp Cyprinus carpio; and the floods brought on by climate change.
