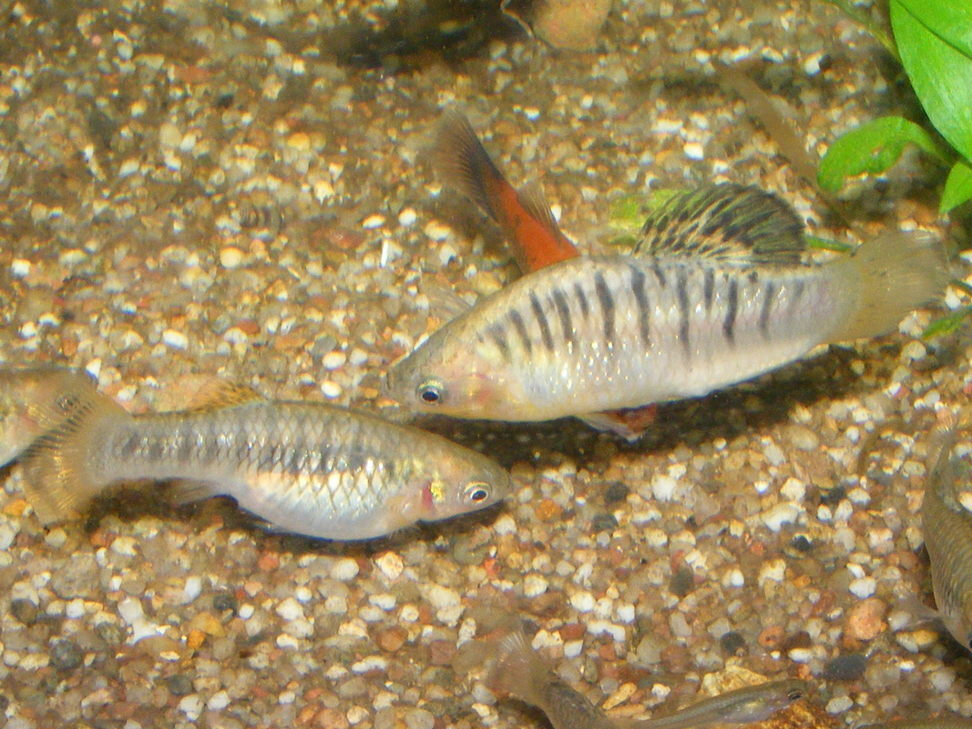
- A female (left) and a male (right)

Conservation status
- Critically Endangered (IUCN 3.1)

Scientific classification
- Kingdom: Animalia
- Phylum: Chordata
- Class: Actinopterygii
- Division: Teleostei
- Order: Cyprinodontiformes
- Family: Poeciliidae
- Genus: Limia
- Species: L. nigrofasciata

Binomial name
- Limia nigrofasciata Regan, 1913

Synonyms
- Poecilia nigrofasciata (Regan, 1913); Limia arnoldi Regan, 1913

= Humpbacked limia =

Species of fish

The humpbacked limia or black-barred limia (Limia nigrofasciata) is a critically endangered species of poeciliid fish which is endemic to Haiti. Its common name is derived from the hump males develop as they age. It is sometimes kept in home aquaria.

== Description ==
Limia nigrofasciata grows to a length of 5.2 centimetres (2.0 in) in standard length. Both males and females are colorful, with translucent and glittery bodies featuring dark vertical bars (from which the specific epithet nigrofasciata is derived). The males also have an enlarged dorsal fin with purple flecks. As they mature, the males become distinctly humpbacked and their golden base color intensifies.

== Ecology ==
Limia nigrofasciata exclusively inhabits Lake Miragoâne, but it is not particular about the type of substrate. The fish are notably social and usually form large schools.

In habitats characterized by submerged aquatic vegetation and muddy bottoms, Limia nigrofasciata is found alongside congeners L. islai, L. garnieri, L. miragoanensis, and L. immaculata; fellow poeciliid Gambusia beebei; and the cichlids Nandopsis haitiensis, Oreochromis aureus, and Tilapia rendali (the latter two being introduced species). As a member of the subgenus Limia, L. nigrofasciata is unusual for sharing its habitat with the Odontolimia subgenus limias.

Gut analyses of wild specimens point to Limia nigrofasciata feeding exclusively on detritus and algae, taking no animal food items.

== Reproduction ==
In contrast to its sister species, L. islai (which is often mislabelled as L. nigrofasciata), the reproductive behavior of Limia nigrofasciata features an elaborate courtship display by the males, which try to attract the females by presenting a large, ornamented dorsal fin, wagging their tail, and performing lateral displays. Females deliver 15–30 live young, which are quite large at the length of up to 13 mm (0.51 in). The fry hide in vegetation.

== Importance to humans ==
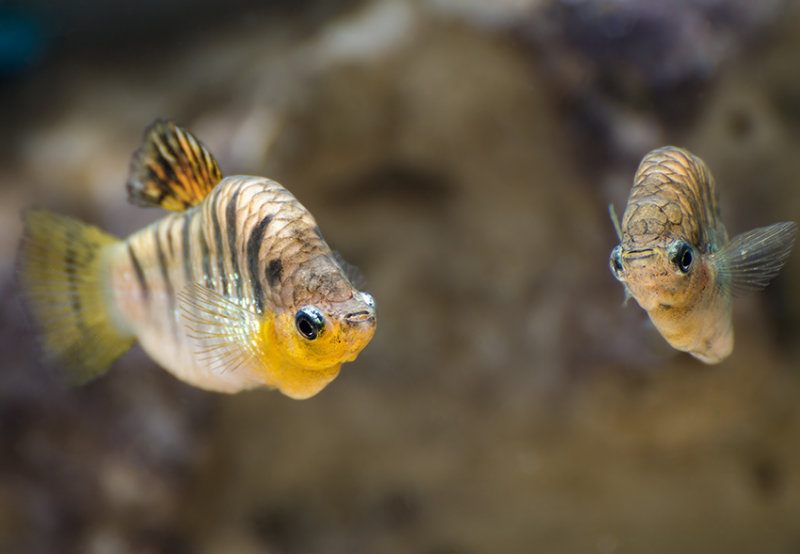
Males sparring

Along with L. melanogaster, Limia nigrofasciata was a popular livebearer in fishkeeping in the early 1960s; it has since been eclipsed by the fancy varieties of Xiphophorus and Poecilia species.

In aquaria, the species is sensitive to water changes, which is especially true for mature males. It requires a constant temperature of 24–26 °C (75–79 °F) and good circulation and aeration. Males fight over territory, while females are usually not aggressive. Adults may prey upon the fry.

== Threats ==
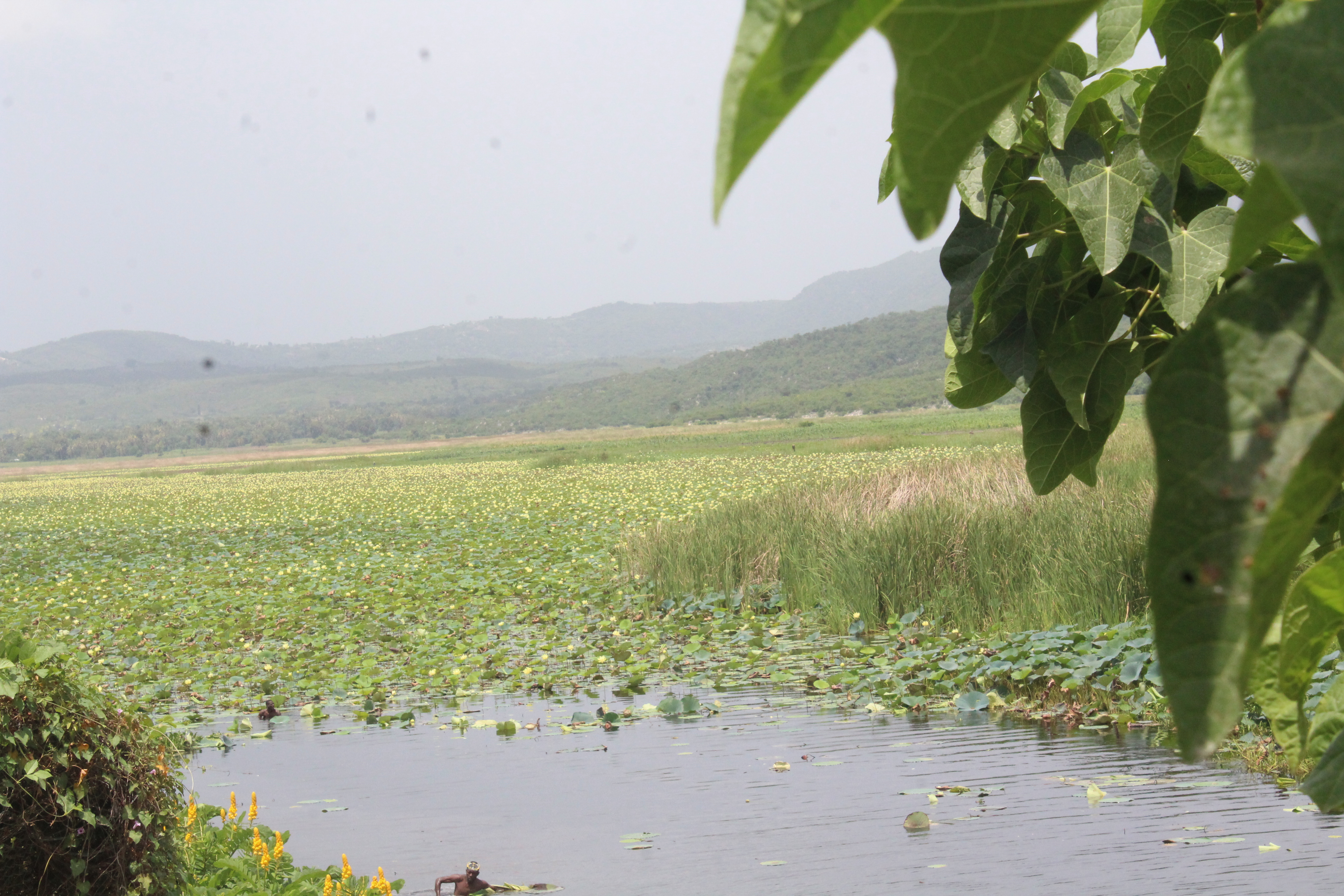
A part of Lake Miragoâne in 2021

Limia nigrofasciata is a critically endangered species. Lake Miragoâne, the only body of water it inhabits, is affected by severe deforestation of the surrounding land, water pollution, and climate change. Currently no species-specific measures are taken to protect L. nigrofasciata. Haiti's forestry laws are lax and essentially non-enforced. The species may be extirpated without site protection and ex-situ conservation.
