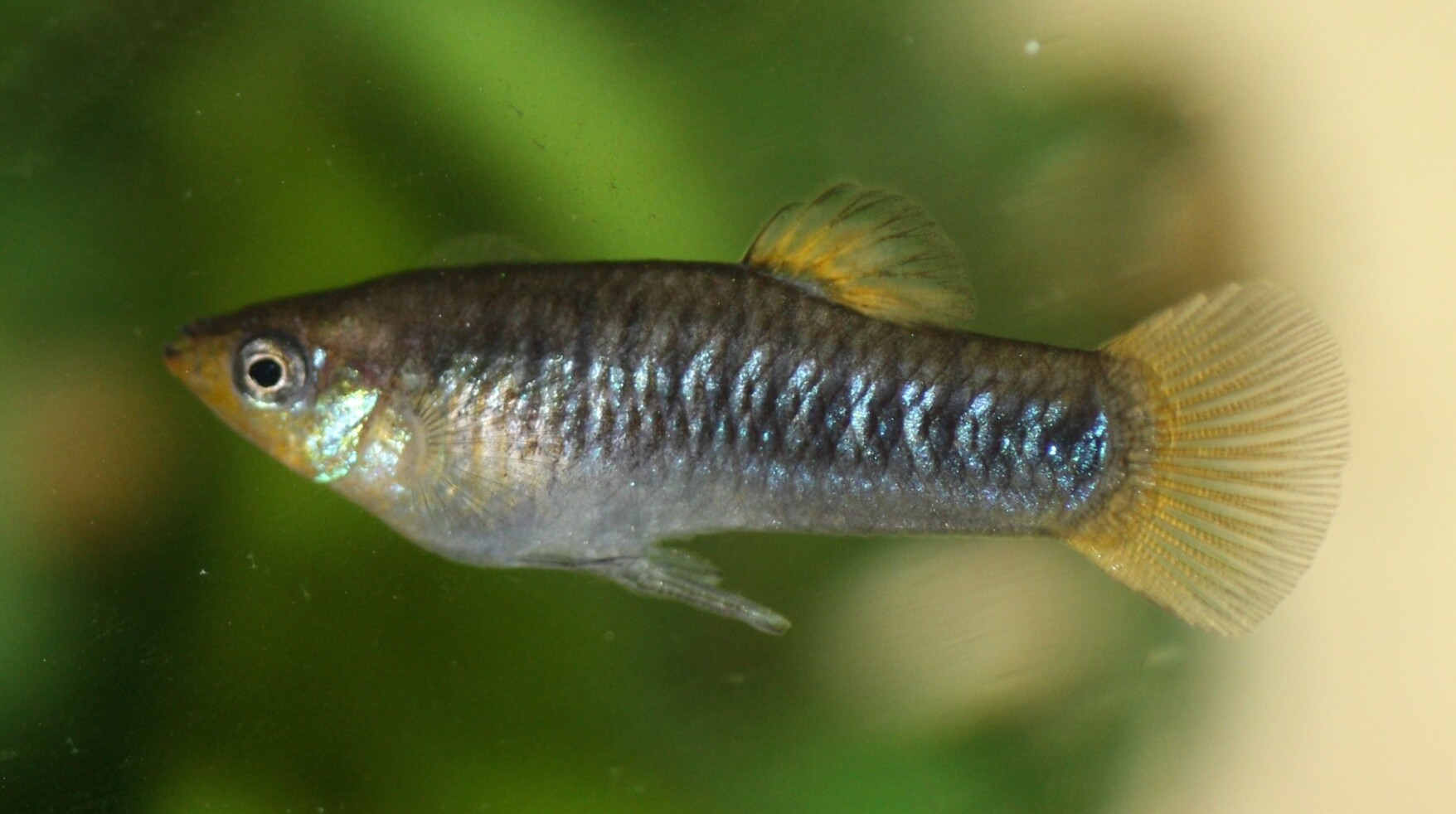
- L. tridens

Scientific classification
- Kingdom: Animalia
- Phylum: Chordata
- Class: Actinopterygii
- Order: Cyprinodontiformes
- Family: Poeciliidae
- Tribe: Poeciliini
- Genus: Limia; Poey, 1854

Type species
- Limia cubensis Poey, 1854

= Limia =

Genus of fishes

Limia is a genus of livebearing fishes belonging to the Cyprinodontiform family Poeciliidae. It comprises 22 described species found in fresh, brackish, saltwater, and hypersaline habitats of the Greater Antilles islands in the Caribbean Sea. A vast majority are endemic to Hispaniola. There has been a long-running debate on whether Limia should be considered a subgenus of Poecilia rather than a full genus. Most Limia species are detrivores and herbivores. Due to their small size and coloring, they are sometimes kept in home aquaria.

== Taxonomy ==
The genus Limia belongs to Poecilidae, the most abundant and species-rich family of freshwater fish on the Greater Antilles. The generic name Limia, derived from Latin, refers to the muddy habitat of the type species, L. vittata. The genus was established in 1854 by Poey. Rosen and Bailey made it a subgenus of the genus Poecilia in their major reclassification of the poeciliid genera in 1963. Rivas, among others, continued to recognize Limia as a distinct genus and resurrected it in 1978, describing eight new species in 1980.

Other Poecilidae genera found on the Antilles include Poecilia, Gambusia, and the endemic genera Girardinus and Quintana. Limia, however, is represented on the islands by more species than any other poeciliid genus, with 22 currently known from Cuba, Grand Cayman, Hispaniola, and Jamaica. Cuba, Grand Cayman, and Jamaica each have one endemic species: L. vittata, L. caymanensis, and L. melanogaster, respectively. The rest are found exclusively on Hispaniola, making the island a center of endemism for the genus. Their distribution on Hispaniola indicates an evolutionary radiation from Lake Miragoâne on the Tiburon Peninsula in particular. Nine species endemic to the lake have been described: L. fuscomaculata, L. garnieri, L. grossidens, L. immaculata, L. islai, L. mandibularis, L. miragoanensis, L. nigrofasciata, and L. ornata.

=== Evolution and phylogeny ===
- - Limia
    - - - - - - Lake Miragoâne group
            - - - L. dominicensis
              - - - - L. melanonotata
                  - - L. perugiae
                  - - L. sulphuropila
              - - L. rivasi
          - - L. yaguajali
        - - L. caymanensis
          - L. vittata
      - - L. versicolor
        - L. zonata
    - - L. melanogaster
  - - Poecilia dominicensis
    - Poecilia hispaniolana

Phylogenetic relationships of Limia, based on the mitochondrial (mt) cytochrome b gene

Most recent studies about the origin of limias conclude that the genus colonized the Antilles islands through oceanic dispersal or vicariance. Weaver et al. posit that GAARlandia, a hypothesized land bridge connecting the area of the modern islands to the South American mainland during the Eocene–Oligocene transition, might have enabled the fish to reach the Antilles through a combination of dispersal, vicariance, and island hopping. Weaver et al. believe that Limia ancestors are unlikely to have arrived exclusively over land, however, because Limia and all other native Antillean species are tolerant of saltwater; if a land bridge had been sufficient, intolerant species would have also colonized the islands.

Limia forms a clade with Pamphorichthys, Mollienesia, Micropoecilia, and Poecilia. Some authorities advocate for all of these taxa to be considered separate genera. In contrast, others maintain that some or all of them should be treated as subgenera of the genus Poecilia. The sister clade to Limia is the one formed by the Hispaniolan Poecilia species P. elegans, P. dominicensis, and P. hispaniolana; all three have been found to be more closely related to Limia than to other Poecilia species, adding to the uncertainty in the taxonomic designations of Poecilia. Limia and the Hispaniolan Poecilia species diverged from Pamphorichthys during the Eocene–Oligocene transition.

The first to split off from the other Limia species, near the Oligocene–Miocene boundary, was L. melanogaster, which went on to colonize Jamaica. This was followed by the colonization of the combined Cuba-Hispaniola landmass. When the Windward Passage divided the landmass into the modern islands of Cuba and Hispaniola, the ancestors of L. vittata and L. caymanensis split from the Hispaniolan species.

=== Species ===
Distribution of L. dominicensis, L. melanotata, L. pauciradiata (maroon), L. perugiae (green), L. rivasii, L. sulphurophila, L. tridens, L. versicolor (purple), L. yaguajali, and L. zonata on Hispaniola

Based on the number and shape of teeth and preopercular pores, Rivas separated the Limia species into two subgenera: Limia and Odontolimia. All seven Odontolimia species are endemic to Lake Miragoâne. One species, Pseudolimia heterandria from Venezuela, was placed in the genus Limia when it was described in 1913, but was moved to its own genus, Pseudolimia, in 2002.

==== Odontolimia ====
- Limia fuscomaculata Rivas, 1980 (blotched limia)
- Limia garnieri Rivas, 1980 (Garnier's limia)
- Limia grossidens Rivas, 1980 (largetooth limia)
- Limia immaculata Rivas, 1980 (plain limia)
- Limia mandibularis Rodriguez-Silva, Torres-Pineda & Josaphat, 2020 (jawed limia)
- Limia miragoanensis Rivas, 1980 (Miragoane limia)
- Limia ornata Regan, 1913 (ornate limia)

==== Limia ====
- Limia caymanensis Rivas & W. L. Fink, 1970 (Grand Cayman limia)
- Limia dominicensis (Valenciennes, 1846) (Tiburon Peninsula limia)
- Limia islai, Rodriguez-Silva & Weaver, 2020 (tiger limia)
- Limia melanogaster (Günther, 1866) (blackbelly limia)
- Limia melanonotata Nichols & G. S. Myers, 1923 (blackbanded limia)
- Limia nigrofasciata Regan, 1913 (black-barred limia)
- Limia pauciradiata Rivas, 1980 (few-rayed limia)
- Limia perugiae (Evermann & H. W. Clark, 1906) (Perugia's limia)
- Limia rivasi L. R. Franz & G. H. Burgess, 1983 (Rivas's limia)
- Limia sulphurophila Rivas, 1980 (sulfur limia)
- Limia tridens (Hilgendorf, 1889)
- Limia versicolor (Günther, 1866) (varicolored limia)
- Limia vittata (Guichenot, 1853) (Cuban limia)
- Limia yaguajali Rivas, 1980 (Yaguajal limia)
- Limia zonata (Nichols, 1915) (striped limia)

== Ecology ==
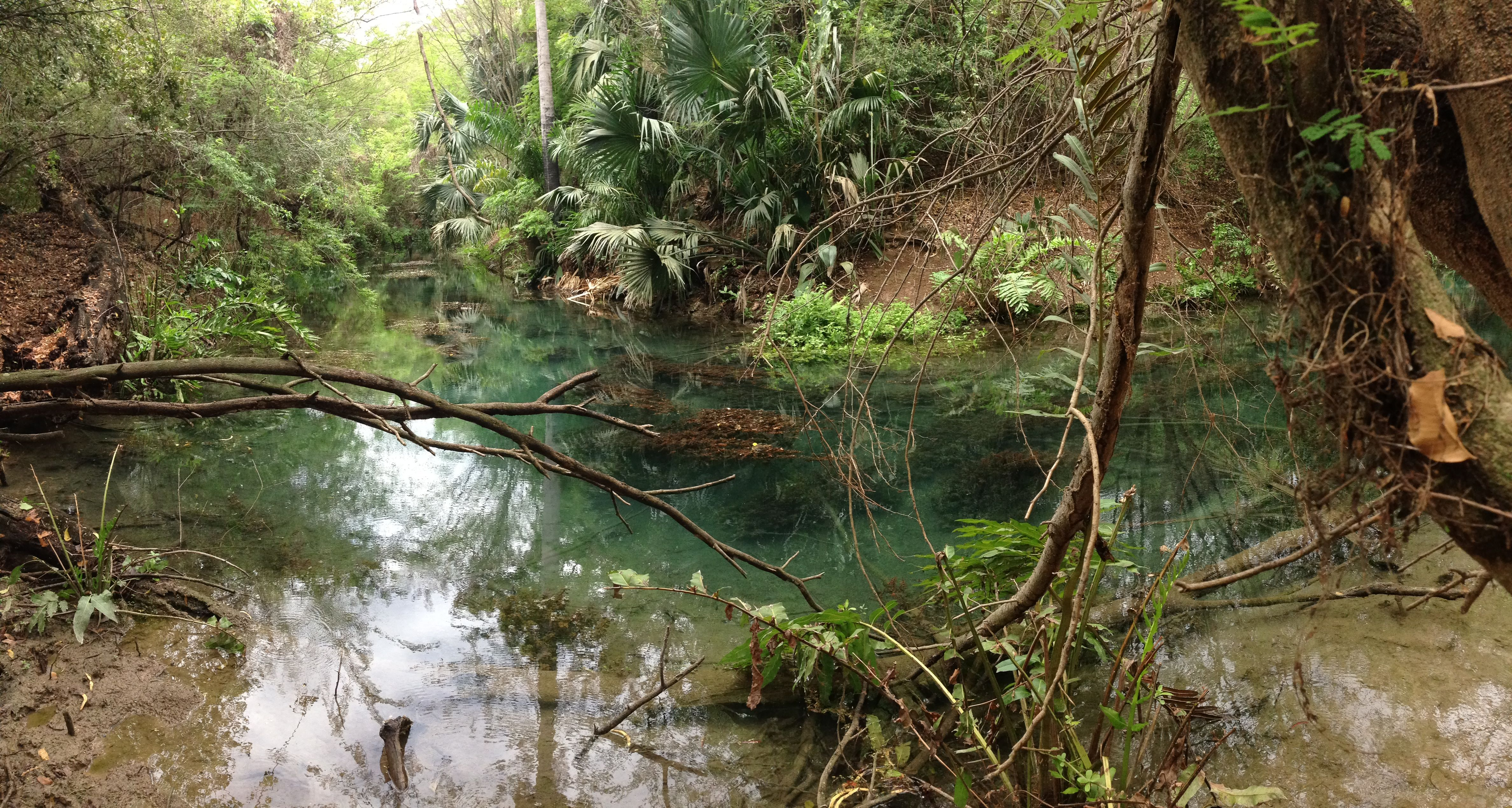
A typical habitat of L. sulphurophila and L. melanonotata

Most Limia species inhabit inland waters such as rivers, springs, and lakes. Some are confined to relatively cool mountain streams. While most are found in freshwater habitats, some species inhabit karst environments high in dissolved inorganic salts or in saline lakes. A few are even found in hypersaline coastal lagoons.

Most Limia species prefer to feed on detritus and algae, with some Hispaniolan species, such as L. nigrofasciata, showing a specialization in detrivory. A trend towards a limnivore diet has also been recorded in the genus. Widespread species such as L. perugiae, L. versicolor, and L. zonata have been found to have a more generalized diet, which (especially in the wet season) includes aquatic invertebrates.

== Traits ==
Limias are small fish, ranging from 1 in (25 mm) to 3 in (76 mm). Many limias have glimmering scales and the color of the sides of the body often contrasts the color of the fins. Hispaniolan limias tend to have color in their dorsal fin. Those native to Haiti (western Hispaniola) often have stripes.

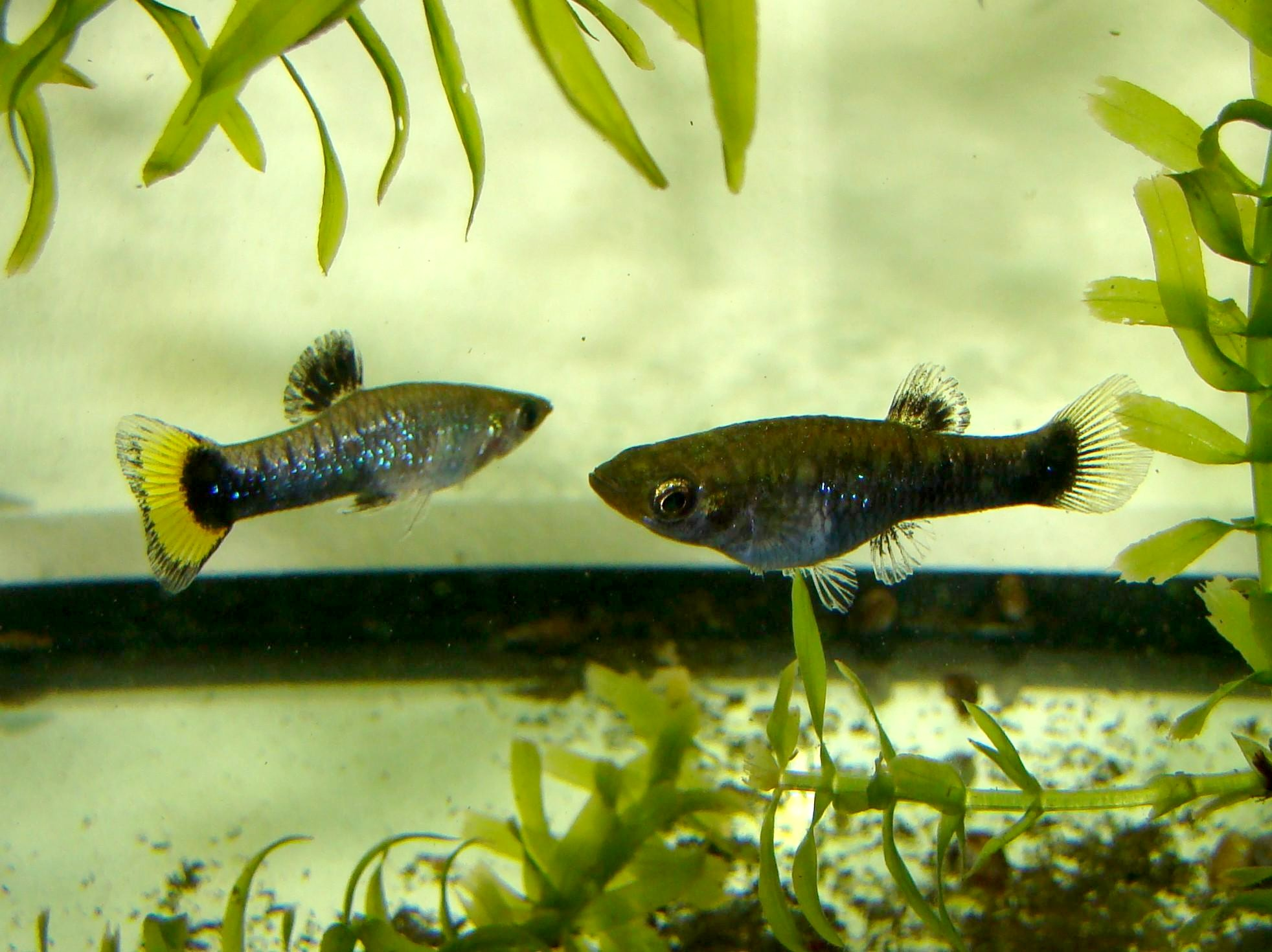
A male L. melanogaster courting a female

Like many poeciliid fish, limias are livebearers. Three species exhibit elaborate premating behavior, with males performing courtship display for females: L. melanogaster, L. nigrofasciata, and L. perugiae. The courtship display evolved in the genus on at least two, and possibly three, separate occasions. Traits such as black edges of the caudal fin and black undersides of the body are phylogenetically correlated with courtship display and probably reflect female choice. The other mating strategy, available to the courting species as well, is the gonopodial thrusting (also called opportunistic mating, forced copulation, or sneak-and-chase), which is ancestral in poeciliids and involves the males attempting to mate without female cooperation. The males' vertical bars and yellow coloration in the caudal fin appear to have evolved before courtship.

== Fishkeeping ==
Limias' small size makes them suitable for keeping in home aquaria. Most species can be maintained in a 10 US gal (38 L; 8.3 imp gal) aquarium. Limias, particularly L. melanogaster and L. nigrofasciata, were more common in the fishkeeping hobby until the advent of the fancy varieties of guppies, mollies, platies, and swordtails.
