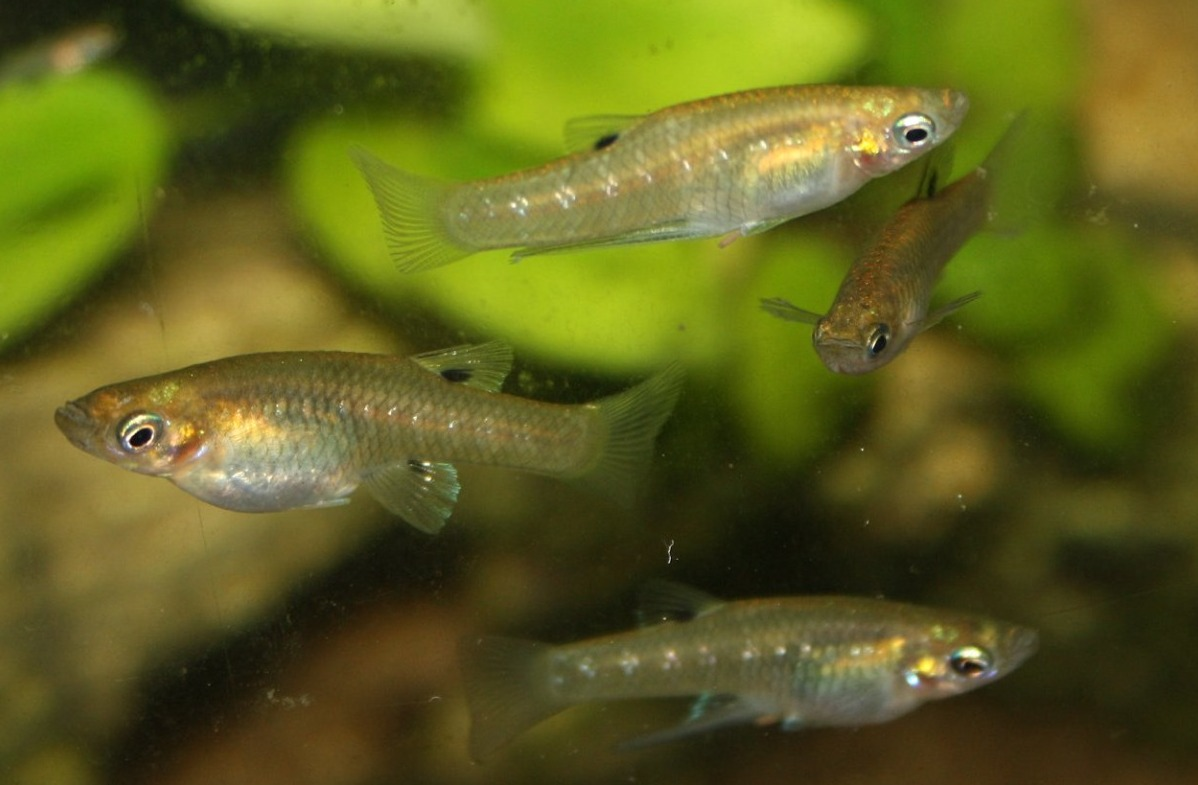
- G. metallicus

Scientific classification
- Kingdom: Animalia
- Phylum: Chordata
- Class: Actinopterygii
- Division: Teleostei
- Order: Cyprinodontiformes
- Family: Poeciliidae
- Tribe: Girardini
- Genus: Girardinus; Poey, 1854

Type species
- Girardinus metallicus Poey, 1854

= Girardinus =

Genus of fishes

Girardinus is a genus of poeciliids native to Cuba. The name of this genus honours the French zoologist Charles Frédéric Girard for his work on the freshwater fish of North America.

Girardinus is endemic (restricted) to Cuba, where it occurs both on the main island and the Isla de la Juventud. Western Cuba contains the highest number of species and is considered the origin of the genus. Girardinus does not occur in central Cuba south of the Sancti Spíritus district nor in several eastern areas, including the short river systems south of the Sierra Maestra and west of Sagua-Baracoa. The speciation in Girardinus may be driven by Cuba's karst topography, in which rivers are interrupted by waterfalls or vanish underground for several kilometers. All Girardinus species except G. creolus extend beyond the upper stream reaches.

The evolutionary history of Cuba's freshwater systems can be effectively traced through Girardinus, whose ecological restriction to fresh water, occurrence on two geologically dated islands, island-wide distribution, and relatively high diversity make it a far more informative model than other Antillean freshwater fish. The sister genus to Girardinus is Quintana, likewise a Cuban endemic. Carlhubbsia from Central America has also been proposed as a sister genus, but this relationship has been disproven by genetic analyses.

It has been posited that the ancestor of modern Girardinus crossed a land bridge from the eastern Yucatan Peninsula to Cuba during the Upper Miocene–Pliocene, and that the ancestral species resembled G. creolus Alternatively, poeciliids may have colonized the Antilles from South America via GAARlandia.

== Species ==
FishBase lists seven species in this genus:

- Girardinus creolus Garman, 1895 (Creole topminnow)
- Girardinus cubensis (C. H. Eigenmann, 1903) (Cuban topminnow)
- Girardinus denticulatus Garman, 1895 (toothy topminnow)
- Girardinus falcatus (C. H. Eigenmann, 1903) (goldbelly topminnow)
- Girardinus metallicus Poey, 1854 (metallic livebearer)
- Girardinus microdactylus Rivas, 1944 (smallfinger topminnow)
- Girardinus uninotatus Poey, 1860 (singlespot topminnow)

An eighth species, Girardinus rivasi, is alternatively considered synonymous with G. microdactylus.
