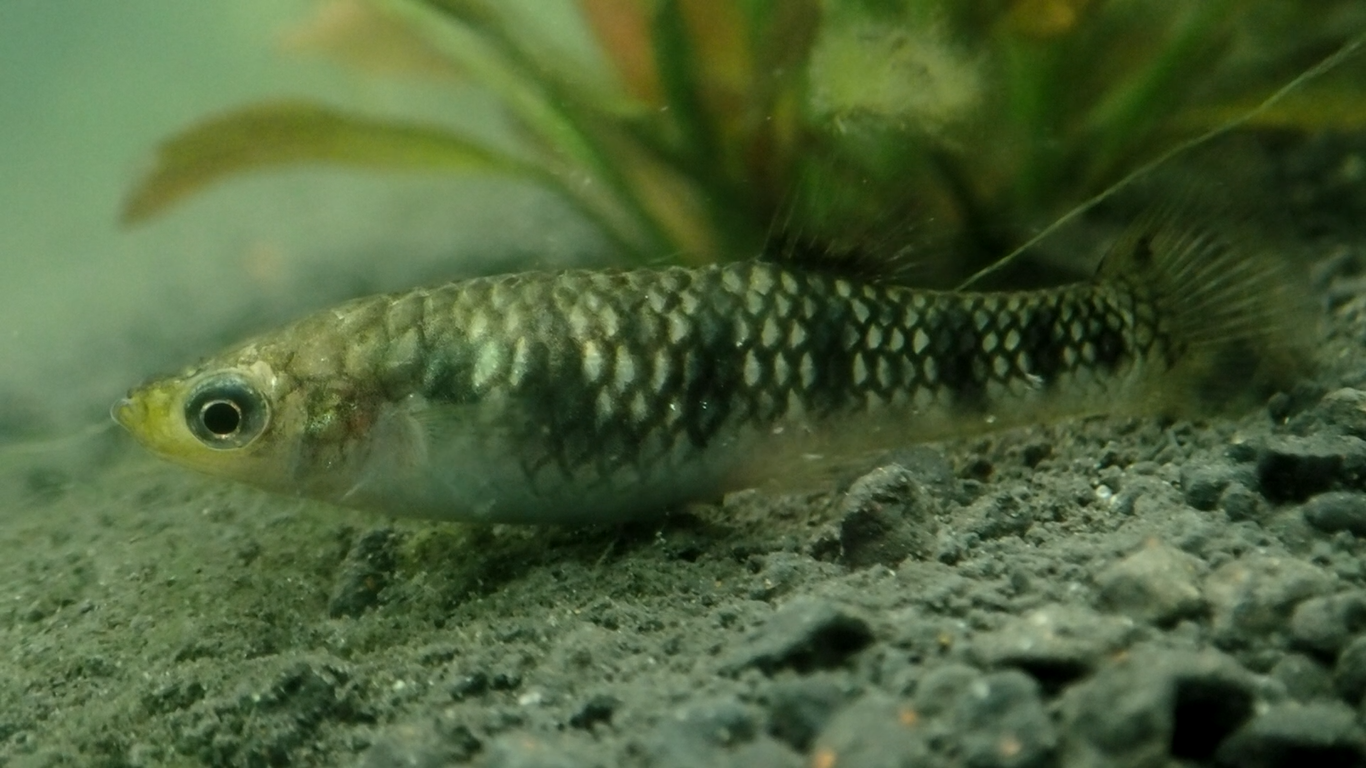
- A female tiger limia (L. islai)

Conservation status
- Critically Endangered (IUCN 3.1)

Scientific classification
- Kingdom: Animalia
- Phylum: Chordata
- Class: Actinopterygii
- Order: Cyprinodontiformes
- Family: Poeciliidae
- Genus: Limia
- Species: L. islai

Binomial name
- Limia islai Rodriguez-Silva & Weaver, 2020

= Limia islai =

Species of freshwater fish

Limia islai, also known as the tiger limia, is a species of fish within the family Poeciliidae. This species is one of several Limia that are endemic to Lake Miragoâne, Haiti.

== Description ==
Limia islai can be distinguished by almost all other Limia species by the presence of black vertical stripes across the fishes body. The only other Limia species to possess a similar striping is Limia nigrofasciata. Stripes are present on both male and female members of L. islai. The number of stripes on an individual fish can vary between 4 and 12. Limia islai have slender bodies which are olive green in colour and fish possess yellow pigment in their snout and fins.

== Distribution and habitat ==
Limia islai is endemic to Haiti, where the species is restricted to the Tiburon Peninsula of Southwest Haiti. This species has only been recorded in the coastal Lake Miragoâne. The lake is freshwater and reaches a maximum depth of 45 metres (150 ft). The habitat consists of aquatic vegetation and a muddy substrate.

== Reproduction ==
Unlike the similarly striped L. nigrofasciatata which mates via courtship, Limia islai will sneak up on their females in order to thrust their gonopodium into them and mate. Limia islai is a livebearer, which reproduces via internal fertilization and gives birth to live young. Mated females will release between 5 and 20 fry per pregnancy.

== Etymology ==
The word Limia is derived from the Latin word "limus", which means mud. This refers to a Limias feeding habit of searching through mud. The word Islai however is reference to the first person to introduce the species in the aquarium hobby, Dominic Isla.
