= De Geer Land Bridge =

Former land bridge from Scandinavia to Greenland

The De Geer Land Bridge was a land bridge that connected Fennoscandia to northern Greenland. The land bridge provided a northern route from Europe to North America from the Late Cretaceous to the Early Paleocene, although this timeframe has been disputed.

Notable past (purple) and current (orange) land bridges on a bathymetric equirectangular projection centred on 45° E

The De Geer Land Bridge provided a path from Scandinavia across the Barents Sea to Svalbard, northern Greenland, and northern Canada. This may have been possible due to the Barents Sea residing on the shallow continental shelf.

== Relation to other land bridges ==
The De Geer Land Bridge was the initial route from Europe and North America. Long after the De Geer Land Bridge disappeared, the Thule Land Bridge appeared and offered a more southern route from Europe to North America.

Beringia, a land bridge from Northeast Asia to Alaska, was another route to North America that existed at the same time as the De Geer Land Bridge.
