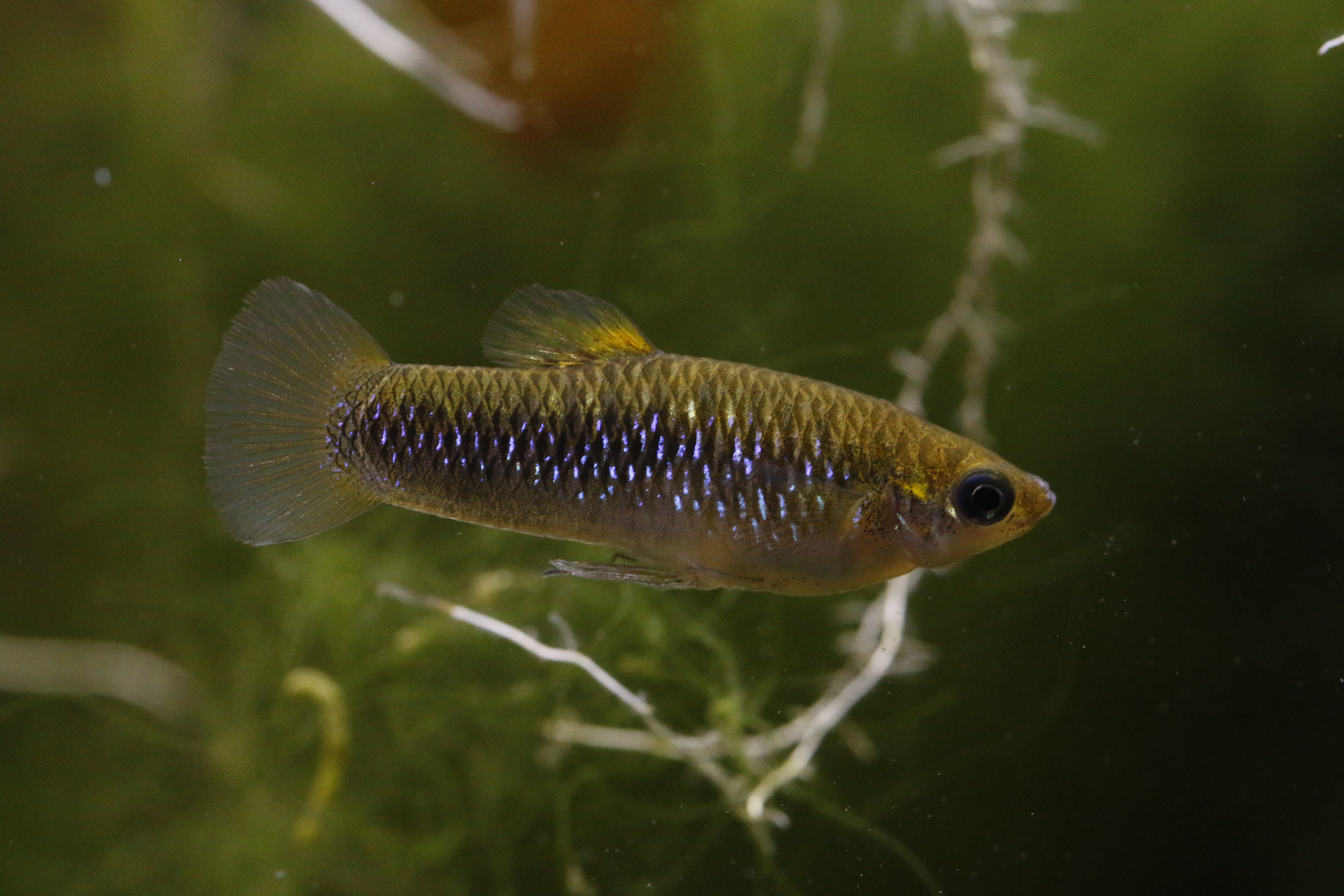

Conservation status
- Critically Endangered (IUCN 3.1)

Scientific classification
- Kingdom: Animalia
- Phylum: Chordata
- Class: Actinopterygii
- Order: Cyprinodontiformes
- Family: Poeciliidae
- Subfamily: Poeciliinae
- Tribe: Poeciliini
- Genus: Limia
- Species: L. sulphurophila

Binomial name
- Limia sulphurophila Rivas, 1980
- Known distribution of Limia sulphurophila sensu lato (red)

= Limia sulphurophila =

Species of fish

Limia sulphurophila, also known as sulphur limia, is a livebearing fish in the family Poeciliidae. It is endemic to the Dominican Republic in the island of Hispaniola.

== Taxonomic history ==
The holotype (MCZ 54401) is an adult male collected by Ernest Edward Williams, Susan M. Case, and José Rosado at a sulfur spring at Balneario La Zurza, on August 19, 1978.

One phylogenetic analysis showed that L. sulphurophila is a sister species to L. melanonotata and L. perugiae.

=== Etymology ===
The name sulphurophila ("sulfur loving") refers to the ecology of this species, as the type series was collected in a sulfur spring.

== Morphology ==
Adults and juveniles are pale brown in color, darker dorsally and fading to pale gray on ventral surfaces. Varying degrees of black pigment concentrate on the lateral fields, forming a broad lateral line that extends from the pectoral fins to the caudal fin. A series of iridescent scales that are blueish purple in color are usually scattered along, contrasting with the darker ground color of the lateral fields. Females and juveniles have a rounded black spot at the base of the dorsal fin. This spot is often reduced or completely absent in older individuals.

The caudal fin on members of this species tends to be broadly rounded. This trait is diagnostic, and helps distinguish this species from sympatric Limia melanonotata. Like other members of the family Poeciliidae, males of L. sulphurophila can be identified by the absence of a broad anal fin and the presence of a gonopodium. Adult males usually develop a yellow to orange dorsal fin as they mature. The orange pigmentation can also be present in the caudal fin and anterior ventral surfaces of the body of males.

== Distribution ==
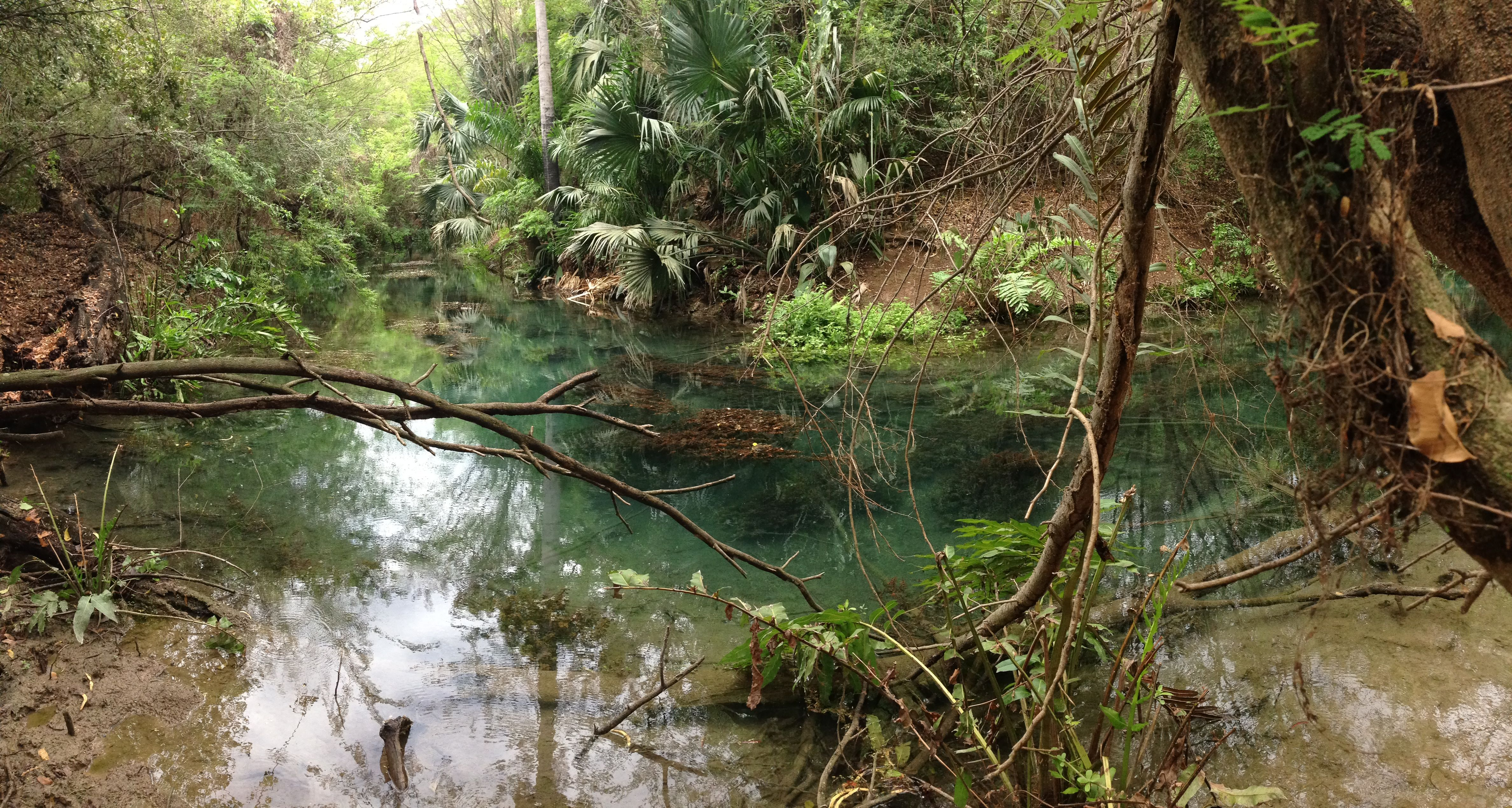
Typical habitat of Limia sulphurophila.

Only known from the sulfur spring at Balneario La Zurza on the Dominican Republic's southeastern shore of Lake Enriquillo. Specimens identified as L. sulphurophila have been collected in multiple springs in the Lake Enriquillo basin. Further studies are required to determine the status of these populations.

== Habitat and ecology ==
Limia sulphurophila inhabits lowland freshwater karst springs on the basin of Lake Enriquillo. These ecosystems are characterized by, hard, alkaline waters with high levels of carbonate salts. Springs inhabited by this species have sandy to gravelly bottom which can be covered with algae and aquatic plants.
