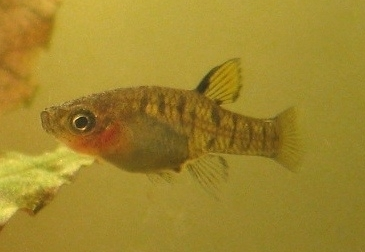

Conservation status
- Critically endangered, possibly extinct (IUCN 3.1)

Scientific classification
- Kingdom: Animalia
- Phylum: Chordata
- Class: Actinopterygii
- Division: Teleostei
- Order: Cyprinodontiformes
- Family: Poeciliidae
- Subfamily: Poeciliinae
- Tribe: Girardini
- Genus: Quintana; C. L. Hubbs, 1934
- Species: Q. atrizona

Binomial name
- Quintana atrizona C. L. Hubbs, 1934

= Quintana atrizona =

Barred topminnow

Species of fish

Quintana atrizona, sometimes known as the barred topminnow, is a species of poeciliid fish endemic to Cuba. It is the sole species in the genus Quintana. Its preferred habitats, heavily vegetated still and slow-moving waters, have been destroyed or degraded, and the species is considered critically endangered. It was last recorded in 2007–2008; surveys of dozens of sites since then have failed to detect it.

== Taxonomy ==
Quintana is a monotypic genus; the only species is Q. atrizona. The genus name, meaning "that which pertains to the fifth", refers to the signature modification of the fifth ray of the gonopodium; the specific epithet refers to the black bars on the fish's body. The sister genus of Quintana is Girardinus. Genetic data indicate that the common ancestors of Quintana and Girardinus migrated to Cuba from South America around 45 to 40 million years ago.

Quintana atrizona entered ornamental fish trade before its scientific description by Carl L. Hubbs in 1934. It was sold under the names Toxus riddlei and Limia heterandria, Limia eptomaculata lara, and Eptomaculata lara (the latter two are nomina nuda). Hubbs determined that it is not closely related to Toxus or Limia.

== Description ==
Q. atrizona is a small, delicate fish with a strongly flattened, side-compressed body that gives it an almost diamond-shaped outline, especially in males. Females grow to about 5 cm, males to 3 cm. Males are deeper-bodied and more sharply angular than females, which appear slightly slimmer. The caudal peduncle (narrow section before the tail) is long and slender. The head forms a short wedge, ending in a straight, vertical chin when the mouth is closed, and the mouth sits at the midline rather than pointing upward, reflecting its midwater swimming habits rather than surface feeding.

The fins are modest and lightly built. In females, the dorsal fin sits roughly opposite the anal fin; in males it is slightly farther back. The dorsal fin is triangular and neatly marked, while the tail fin is gently rounded. Males carry a gonopodium, a specialized anal fin used for reproduction, while the female anal fin is simply pointed.

In life, the body is transparent, with internal structures faintly visible, particularly in males. The basic body color is pale amber-olive, becoming silvery on the belly and cheeks. Dark vertical bars—typically several across the sides—give the fish a distinctly banded look, though the bars may be irregular or broken near the tail. Fine dark lines outline the edges of the scales, creating a subtle net-like pattern over most of the body. The dorsal fin is especially eye-catching, with bold black markings and a warm orange centre, brightest in males. The tail fin is lightly washed with yellow, and darker streaks accent the rear of the body.

== Distribution and habitat ==
Quintana atrizona is endemic to Cuba, where it is found at elevations of 1 to 5 metres (3.3 to 16.4 ft) above sea level. It is native to small freshwater ponds in western Cuba and Isla de la Juventud and has also been found in a small freshwater lagoon at Guanahacabibes Peninsula and the Itabo river. It prefers sites with abundant aquatic vegetation.

Quintana atrizona is critically endangered. Since the 1970s, dam construction has caused extensive habitat fragmentation and destruction. Habitat quality continues to decline as a result of introduced species—such as the predatory fish Clarias gariepinus–as well as riverbank degradation associated with livestock grazing and agricultural activities. Across the species' historical range, habitats are increasingly degraded by contamination from domestic wastewater and the accumulation of solid waste.

The number of individuals and confirmed localities is sharply receding. The species has been extirpated from freshwater ponds in the southern drainage of western Cuba, four previously recorded localities on Isla de la Juventud, and the type locality in Baracoa. The population is severely fragmented: Guanahacabibes Peninsula and the Itabo river, the only localities where the species has been found in 2007–2008, are about 160 kilometres (99 mi) apart. The species has not been recorded since 2007–2008; surveys of both islands in 2014 and 2016 and of dozens of sites in 2018 have recovered no individuals.

== Ecology ==
Quintana atrizona is omnivorous. It usually moves in small groups near the substrate. The species is sexually dimorphic, with males being the smaller sex. Females become sexually mature when they are eight weeks old and males at five weeks. The species is viviparous, with females producing live fry. The fry is the smallest among the poeciliids of Cuba. The young are produced individually, with births spaced several hours apart and continuing over the course of several consecutive days.

== Fishkeeping ==
In the aquarium, Quintana atrizona is peaceful, with only some occasional sparring between males, and readily takes dry food. Adults do not prey on fry and can be kept together with them. The fishkeeping hobby writer Fritz Mayer predicted in 1955 that the species would "undoubtedly some day disappear from aquariums". Q. atrizona no longer appears in ornamental fish trade.
