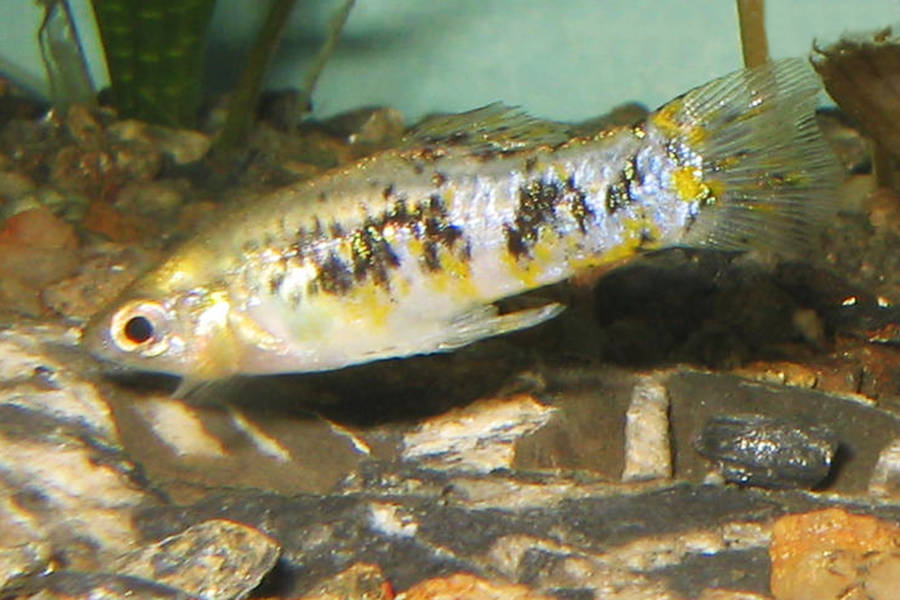

Scientific classification
- Kingdom: Animalia
- Phylum: Chordata
- Class: Actinopterygii
- Order: Cyprinodontiformes
- Family: Poeciliidae
- Genus: Limia
- Species: L. vittata

Binomial name
- Limia vittata (Guichenot, 1853)

Synonyms
- Poecilia vittata Guichenot, 1853; Limia cubensis Poey, 1854; Limia pavonina Poey, 1876

= Cuban limia =

Species of fish

The Cuban limia (Limia vittata), also known as banded limia, Cuban molly, Cuban topminnow or tabai is a species of livebearing freshwater fish from the family Poeciliidae. The species is native to Cuba where it was endemic but it has been introduced to Hawaii.

== Description ==
The Cuban limia is olive-green in background colour and has a bluish-grey back, silvery flanks marked with black-edged scales and a white belly. There is a yellow patch close to the vent in females. In males, the dorsal fin and the anal fin are normally yellow-orange in colour and marked with blue-black spots. The females have colorless fins which are marked with a few scattered, black freckles. The females grow to over twice the size of the males which can have a total length of 5 centimetres (2.0 in), and females reach 10 centimetres (3.9 in). In structure it is a rather robust species, depressed towards the rear with a rounded tail and it has a compressed head which has a small, oblique mouth with a protruding lower jaw and a protractile upper jaw.

== Distribution ==
The Cuban limia is, as the common name suggests, native to Cuba. It occurs throughout the island of Cuba and the neighbouring Isla de la Juventud. It has been introduced to Hawaii, where it is found on the islands of Oahu and Hawaii, where it is found in the Kaloko-Honokōhau National Historical Park.

== Habitat and biology ==
Within its native range the Cuban limia inhabits streams, lakes, estuaries, coastal lagoons, and mangrove swamps and can be found in both freshwater and brackish water, or saline water. Its diet consists of worms, crustaceans, insects and plant material. It often forms mixed shoals with species such as sailfin mollies and mosquitofish. A larger female may give birth to up to 50 fry at a time and in a 4–6 week period can produce up to 100 young.

== Human uses ==
This species is present in the aquarium trade and a number of colour variations have been bred. It is thought that released aquarium fish are the origin of the population in Hawaii where they have been blamed for impacting the population of native damselflies. In Hawaii it has been given the local name tabai.

== Taxonomy ==
The Cuban limia was described by the French zoologist Alphonse Guichenot in 1853 as Poecilia vittata. A year later the Cuban zoologist Felipe Poey described a fish he named Limia cubensis and designated this as the type species of the genus Limia. This was a synonym of Guichenot's Poecilia vittata and so L. vittata was considered the valid name.
