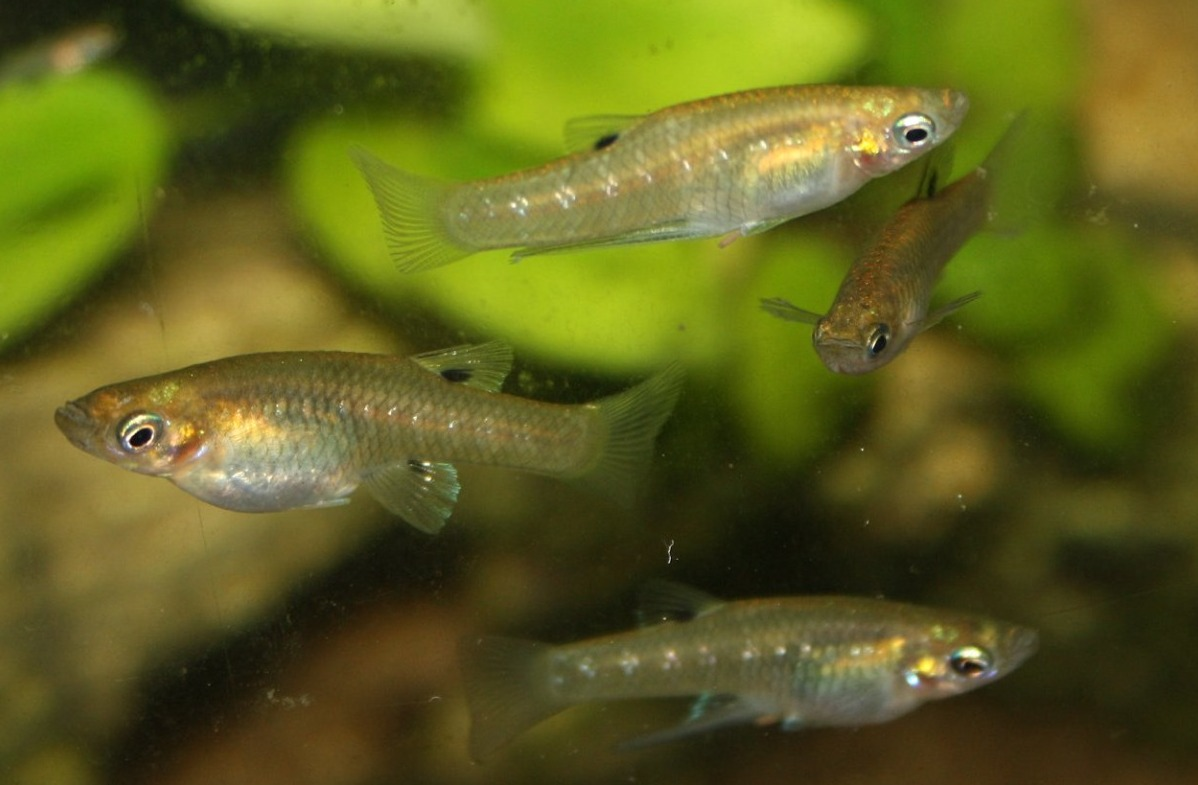

Conservation status
- Least Concern (IUCN 3.1)

Scientific classification
- Kingdom: Animalia
- Phylum: Chordata
- Class: Actinopterygii
- Division: Teleostei
- Order: Cyprinodontiformes
- Family: Poeciliidae
- Genus: Girardinus
- Species: G. metallicus

Binomial name
- Girardinus metallicus (Poey, 1854)

Synonyms
- Girardinus garmani (C. H. Eigenmann, 1903); Girardinus pygmaeus (Rivas, 1944)

= Girardinus metallicus =

Species of fish

Girardinus metallicus, sometimes known as the metallic topminnow or metallic livebearer, is a species of fish from the family of the Poeciliidae.

G. metallicus females grow to 7.9 cm in standard length, while males reach 4.5 cm. The species is polymorphous: some males are colorless, while others have pronounced black or yellow coloring on their undersides. All three morphs occur together in nature.

The species is endemic to Cuba, inhabiting both the main island and the Isla de la Juventud. It is common in lowland swamps, lagoons, and flooded savannahs on the main island and in the Itabo River on the Isla de la Juventud. Water tends to be clear and stagnant. It favors sunlit areas where algae grow. It feeds chiefly on detritus, algae, and mud, but occasionally also takes insect larvae and small fish.

Girardinus metallicus was initially thought to rely exclusively on coerced mating to reproduce; this is the only sexual behavior known in the colorless and yellow morphs. In the black morph, males perform courtship display before inserting their gonopodium (fin modified into sex appendage) into the female's genital opening. Although long gonopodia usually arise in poeciliid species that skip courtship to enforce mating, gonopodia are long in both black and yellow males, which may reflect female preference. Larger males with longer gonopodia court and try to mate more often, suggesting that black color may signal social status. Black coloration is also associated with higher aggression. The male displays by lifting his head in a "chin-up" posture, extending his gonopodium almost perpendicular to his body, and positioning himself in front of and alongside the female so that he stays within her view. Broods average 13.5 offspring. Fry are born at a length of about 1 cm. They grow rapidly, reaching sexual maturity from 5 to 12 weeks old.

Girardinus metallicus appears in ornamental fish trade. The species was imported in Germany in 1906. It is not collected in the wild.
