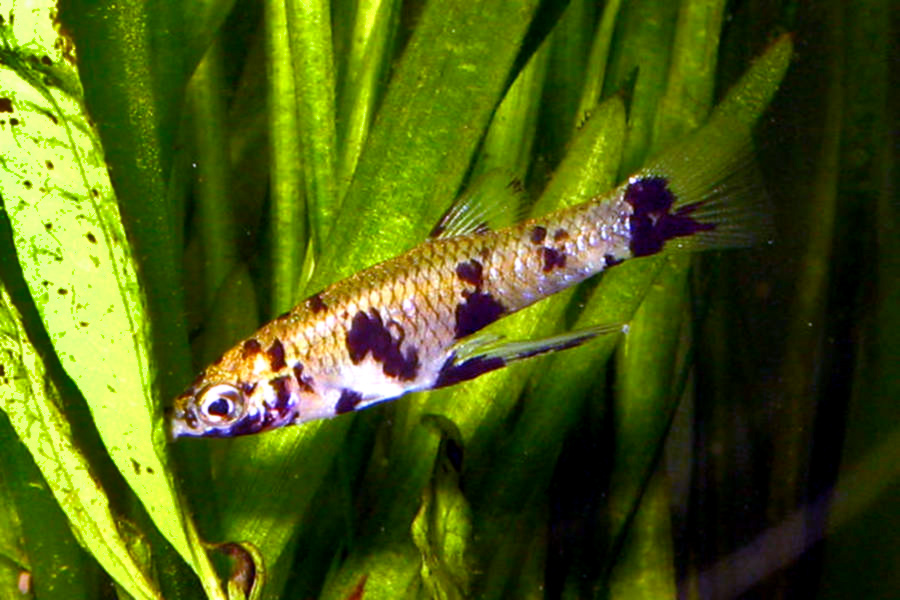
- Girardinus denticulatus

Scientific classification
- Kingdom: Animalia
- Phylum: Chordata
- Class: Actinopterygii
- Order: Cyprinodontiformes
- Family: Poeciliidae
- Subfamily: Poeciliinae
- Tribe: Girardini; Hubbs, 1924

= Girardini =

Tribe of fishes

The Girardini is a tribe of killifishes from the "livebearer" family Poeciliidae, consisting of three genera and 10 species. The tribe was originally delineated by Carl Leavitt Hubbs in 1924.

== Genera ==
The genera classified in this tribe are:

- Carlhubbsia Whitley, 1951
- Girardinus Poey, 1854
- Quintana (genus) Hubbs, 1934
