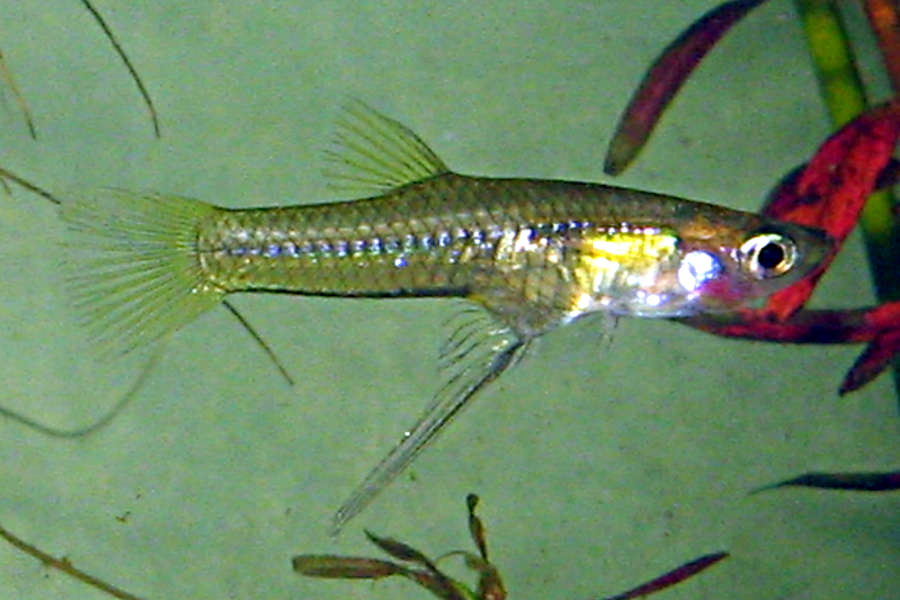

Conservation status
- Least Concern (IUCN 3.1)

Scientific classification
- Kingdom: Animalia
- Phylum: Chordata
- Class: Actinopterygii
- Order: Cyprinodontiformes
- Family: Poeciliidae
- Genus: Girardinus
- Species: G. falcatus

Binomial name
- Girardinus falcatus (C. H. Eigenmann, 1903)

Synonyms
- Glaridichthys falcatus Eigenmann, 1903; Glaridichthys atherinoides Rivas, 1944

= Girardinus falcatus =

Species of fish

Girardinus falcatus, the goldbelly topminnow, is a species of Cuban tropical fish. Another common name of the species is yellow belly. The fish is pale gold and has a bright blue iris. Males are smaller than females and constantly mate. Females can grow to 8.5 cm (3.3 in) standard length, males to less than half of that.
