= Limia melanonotata =

Conservation status
- Least Concern (IUCN 3.1)

Scientific classification
- Kingdom: Animalia
- Phylum: Chordata
- Class: Actinopterygii
- Order: Cyprinodontiformes
- Family: Poeciliidae
- Genus: Limia
- Species: L. melanonotata

Binomial name
- Limia melanonotata Nichols & Myers, 1923

Species of fish

Limia melanonotata, the blackbanded limia, is a toothcarp in the family Poeciliidae. It is endemic to the island of Hispaniola (in both Haiti and the Dominican Republic).

== Taxonomic history ==
John Treadwell Nichols and George S. Myers wrote their species description for L. melanonotata in 1923. The holotype and 22 paratypes were collected by Gladwyn Kingsley Noble in Las Lagas, Hispaniola. Nichols and Myers also identified a specimen collected by F. E Watson in Manville, Haiti as belonging to this species. The holotype is at the American Museum of Natural History.

For those who recognize Limia as a distinct genus, this species is in its subgenus Limia. Others classify it in the Limia subgenus within the Poecilia genus.

Some ichthyologists have suggested that L. melanonotata is synonymous with L. perugiae.

== Distribution ==
Distribution as recorded in 1983

It is found in the lower Artibonite River, Plain of the Cul-de-Sac, Haiti; extending to the Valle de Neiba (nl) in the southwestern Dominican Republic.
