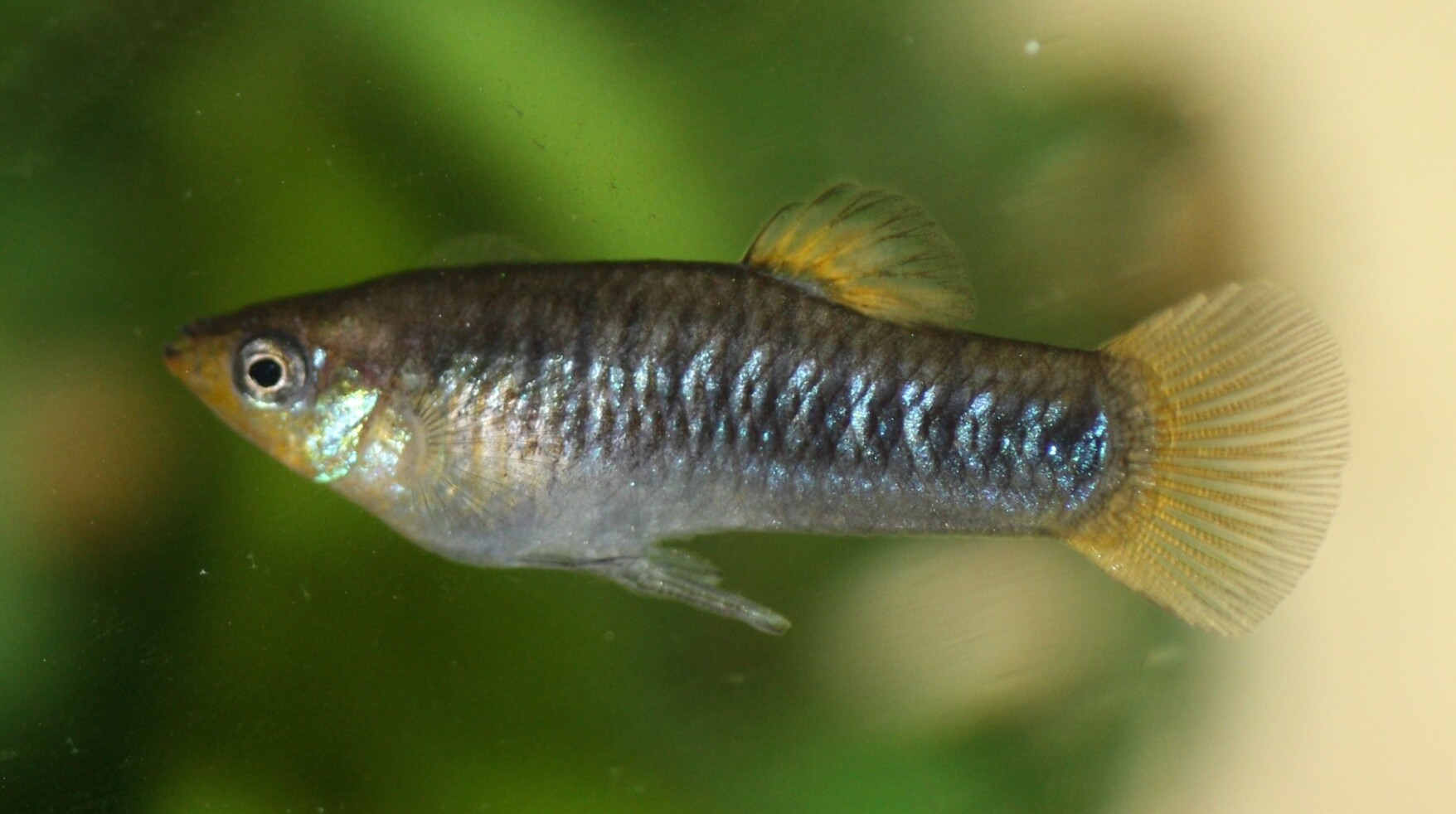
- A male
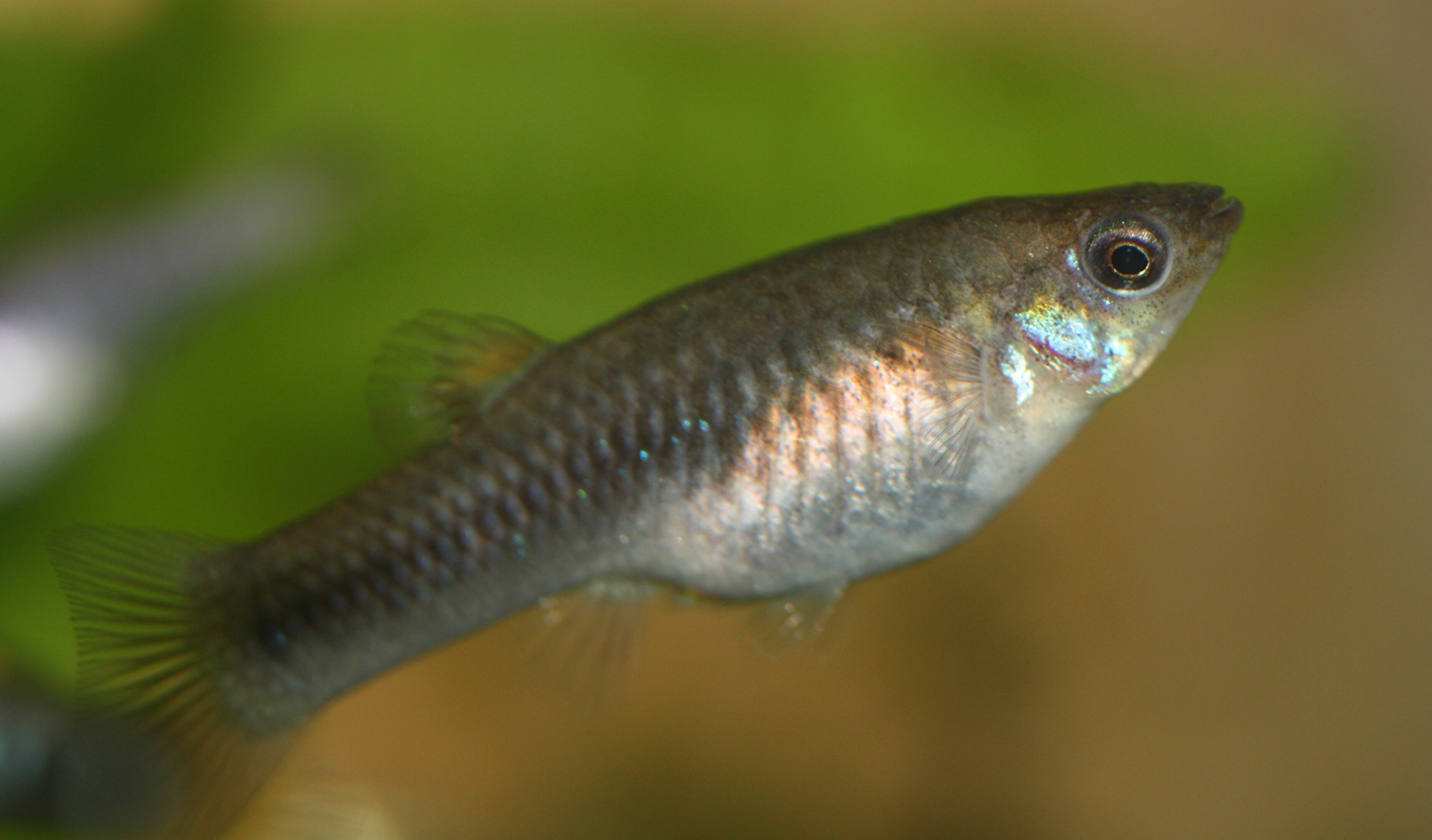
- A female

Conservation status
- Least Concern (IUCN 3.1)

Scientific classification
- Kingdom: Animalia
- Phylum: Chordata
- Class: Actinopterygii
- Order: Cyprinodontiformes
- Family: Poeciliidae
- Genus: Limia
- Species: L. tridens

Binomial name
- Limia tridens (Hilgendorf, 1889)

Synonyms
- Poecilia tridens Hilgendorf, 1889

= Limia tridens =

Species of fish

Limia tridens, commonly known as the Tiburon limia, is a poeciliid fish endemic to the Caribbean island of Hispaniola.

L. tridens is found in the lakes, streams, and springs of the lower Artibonite River system, the Neiba Valley, and the streams of both slopes of the Tiburon Peninsula in south-western Haiti.

Males grow to about 3 cm (1.2 in) in standard length.
