= Aves Ridge =

Ridge in the eastern Caribbean Sea

Coordinates: 14°00′N 63°30′W

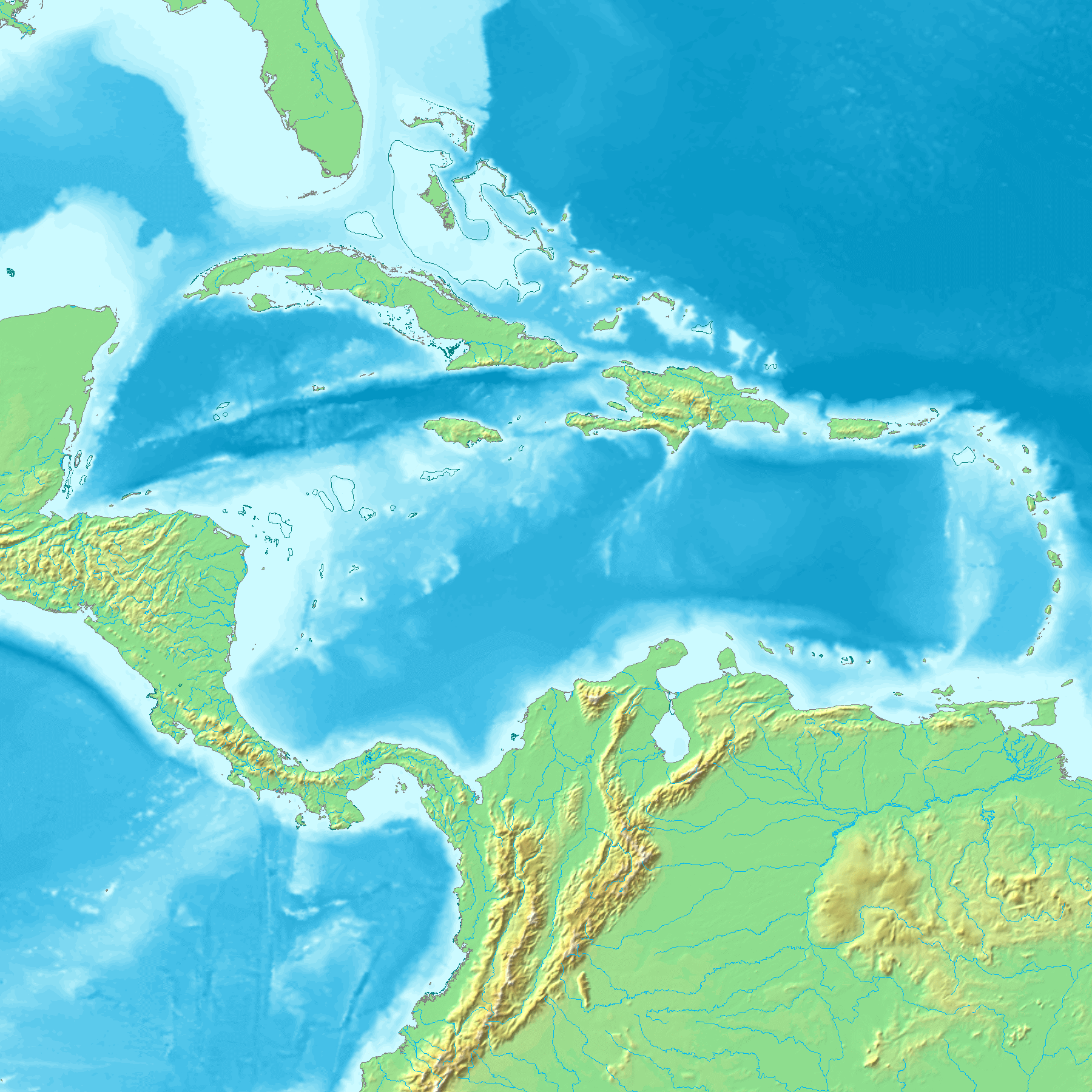
Topographic/bathymetric map of the Caribbean, with the Aves Ridge to the west of the Lesser Antilles

The Aves Ridge is a ridge in the eastern Caribbean Sea. It runs in a north-south direction, approximately 250 km west of the Lesser Antilles Volcanic Arc. It is mostly under water, but it reaches the surface in the north as Aves Island and in the south as La Blanquilla Island and Los Hermanos Archipelago. Most geologists believe that the Aves Ridge originated as a volcanic arc which is now extinct, though its width poses a problem; the date of its origin is generally placed in the Cretaceous. The GAARlandia hypothesis posits that the Aves Ridge was above sea level for a short time around 33 million years ago (around the Eocene–Oligocene boundary), allowing South American land animals to expand to the Greater Antilles, but this hypothesis has been strongly disputed based on a lack of geological evidence for the ridge forming a fully exposed land bridge during this interval, and it has been alternatively that the animals arrived via oceanic dispersal instead. Despite disputes about its exposure at the Eocene–Oligocene boundary, it is suggested that the Aves Ridge was largely exposed as dry land during the Paleocene (66–56 million years ago), but from the beginning of the Eocene onwards it was largely submerged. The Aves Ridge has been suggested to have facilitated faunal interchange between North and South America at the end of the Cretaceous and during the Paleocene.
