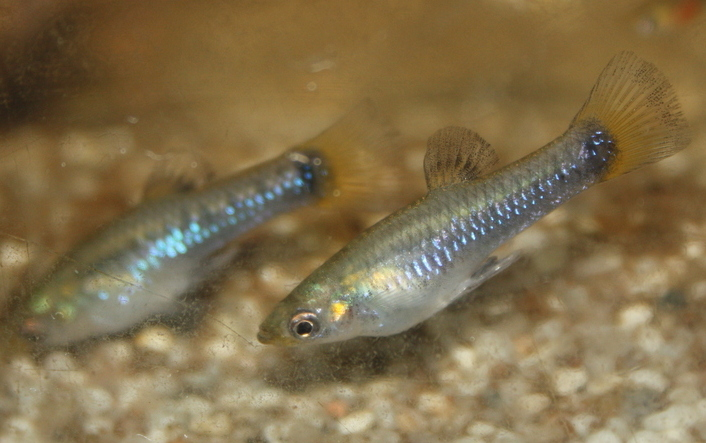
- Males
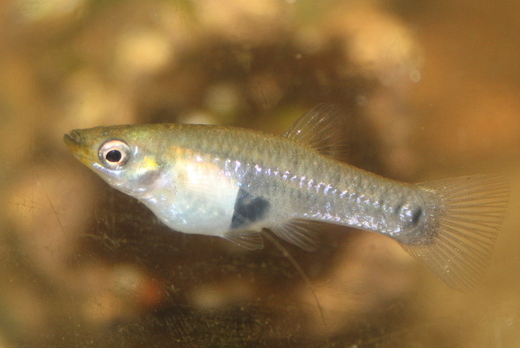
- A female

Conservation status
- Near Threatened (IUCN 3.1)

Scientific classification
- Kingdom: Animalia
- Phylum: Chordata
- Class: Actinopterygii
- Division: Teleostei
- Order: Cyprinodontiformes
- Family: Poeciliidae
- Genus: Limia
- Species: L. melanogaster

Binomial name
- Limia melanogaster (Günther, 1866)

Synonyms
- Poecilia melanogaster Günther, 1866

= Limia melanogaster =

Black-bellied limia

Species of fish

Limia melanogaster, the black-bellied or blue limia, is a poeciliid fish from Jamaica. It inhabits fast-flowing streams. It is a rare livebearer in modern fishkeeping.

== Evolution and taxonomy ==
DNA research shows that L. melanogaster is basal to others in the genus Limia: it was the first to split from other limias, which inhabit other islands in the West Indies, around 22.8 million years ago at the Oligocene–Miocene boundary.

Originally placed in the genus Limia by Albert Günther in 1866, it was transferred to the genus Poecilia along with other congeners by Donn E. Rosen and Reeve M. Bailey in their extensive reclassification of poeciliids in 1963. This was reversed by Luis R. Rivas in 1978. The name Poecilia melanogaster is therefore today considered a junior synonym.

== Description ==
L. melanogaster is the second slimmest species in its genus after L. zonata. The species is exceptionally variable. The base color of the fish is greenish-gray. Adults, and especially males when courting females, exhibit a metallic steel blue gloss.

The male's caudal peduncle and dorsal fin are black, while the caudal fin is yellow with a black rim. Male fish usually also have patches of black and sulfur-yellow scales on their heads, fins, and flanks. Sexually mature females instead have a large bluish-black pigmented area around the gonopore called the gravid spot, unique in the genus. Such chromatic distinction from both males and juvenile females is unusual among female poeciliids. Female fish grow to 5 cm (2.0 in) standard length, while the males attain 4 cm (1.6 in).

== Distribution and habitat ==
L. melanogaster is the only limia native to Jamaica. It inhabits the south and west of the island.

Limia melanogaster is endemic to Jamaica, specifically the southern and western parts of the island. It has been collected in the headwaters of the Black River drainage and Blue Hole River.

The species prefers fast-flowing and shallow water, usually around 50 cm (20 in) deep. It is also found in flooded areas. One examined habitat was a small, 10–20 cm (3.9–7.9 in) deep stream with a muddy substrate, while the Blue Hole River habitat contains a rocky substrate. The habitats tend to contain little to no vegetation but are rich in aufwuchs. The species shares its habitat with a fellow poeciliid Gambusia wrayi and certain cichlids and gobies.

== Diet ==
L. melanogaster is omnivorous. Its diet consists of worms, crustaceans, insects, and plant matter. Algae make up a significant portion of its diet, especially in brackish water.

== Reproduction ==
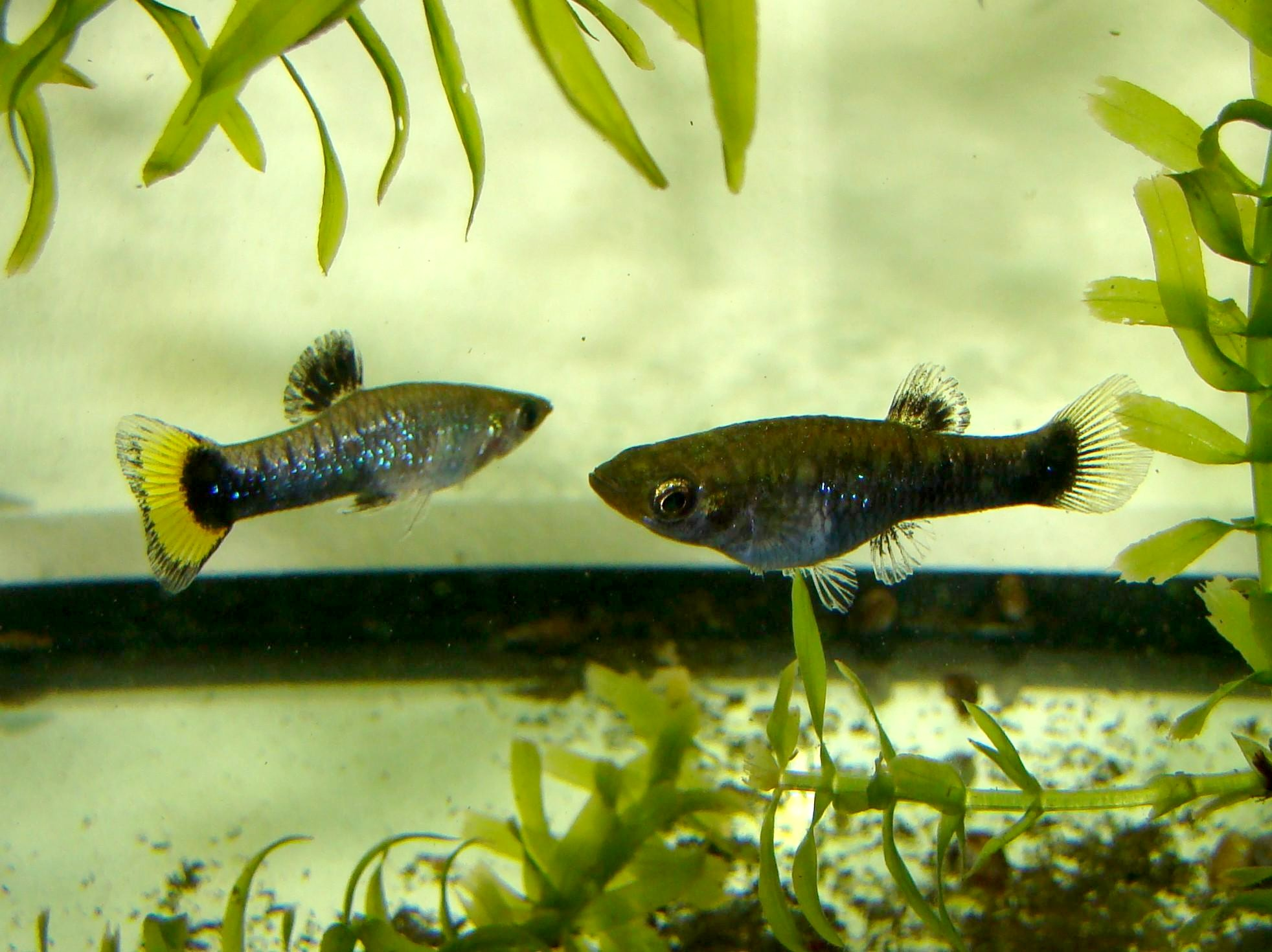
A male (left) courting a female (right)

In captivity, females reach maturity aged between 4 and 5 months. The males spend over 26 minutes per hour courting females. Like many other poeciliids, L. melanogaster is ovoviparous. The gestation lasts approximately 4 weeks. Depending on her size, a female then gives birth to 20 to 80 young. The newborn fry are 6–9 mm (0.24–0.35 in) long. Adults seldom prey on the fry.

== In aquarium ==
L. melanogaster is easily kept in home aquaria. Neale Monks of the Tropical Fish Hobbyist magazine listed L. melanogaster among seven livebearers which were more commonly kept in aquaria until the introduction of new, fancy varieties. It is an agile swimmer and thus needs ample space despite its modest size.
