= Carlhubbsia =

Scientific classification
- Kingdom: Animalia
- Phylum: Chordata
- Class: Actinopterygii
- Order: Cyprinodontiformes
- Family: Poeciliidae
- Tribe: Girardini
- Genus: Carlhubbsia; Whitley, 1951

Type species
- Allophallus kidderi Hubbs, 1936

Genus of fishes

Carlhubbsia is a genus of poeciliids native to Guatemala and Mexico. The name of this genus honours the American ichthyologist Carl Leavitt Hubbs (1894–1979) who originally named the genus Allophallus, a name which was preoccupied by a genus of Diptera.

== Species ==
There are currently two recognized species in this genus:

- Carlhubbsia kidderi (C. L. Hubbs, 1936) (Champoton gambusia)
- Carlhubbsia stuarti D. E. Rosen & R. M. Bailey, 1959 (Barred livebearer)
