= Thule Land Bridge =

Image of the Thule Land Bridge in Context with the North Atlantic

Image of the Thule Land Bridge in Context with the North Atlantic

The Thule Land Bridge (also called the Thulean North Atlantic Bridge) was a land bridge, now submerged beneath the Atlantic Ocean, that connected the British Isles to central Greenland. The land bridge appeared during the Late Paleocene and disappeared during the early Eocene. The Thule Land Bridge is theorized to have connected northern Europe to North America by way of the British Isles and Greenland. The Faroe Islands, the Iceland-Faroe Ridge, Iceland, and the shallow portion of the Denmark Strait may have been parts of the Thule Land Bridge.

== Relation to other land bridges ==
While it existed, the Thule Land Bridge would have connected Doggerland to Greenland.

It is also theorized that the land bridge from Europe to North America was completed with an unnamed crossing at the southern portion of the Davis Strait, connecting Greenland to Baffin Island.

Notable past (purple) and current (orange) land bridges on a bathymetric equirectangular projection centred on 45° E
