= GAARlandia =

Hypothesized land bridge 33 mya

Animal and plant species are hypothesized to have colonized the Antilles by walking from South America over a lost land bridge.

Notable past (purple) and current (orange) land bridges on a bathymetric equirectangular projection centred on 45° E

GAARlandia (from Greater Antilles + Aves Ridge) is a hypothesized land bridge which is proposed to have connected the Greater Antilles to South America around 33 million years ago (mya) via the now submerged Aves Ridge to the west of the Lesser Antilles. Animal and plant species are thought to have colonized the Caribbean Islands through dispersal and vicariance, and the most prominent vicariance hypothesis involves colonization via GAARlandia. Proponents of the hypothesis cite studies of individual lineages, while critics point to a lack of geological evidence for a landbridge during this interval.

== Hypothesis ==
The GAARlandia hypothesis was introduced by Ross MacPhee and Manuel Iturralde-Vinent in 1994. It posits that the North American and South American plates compressed the Caribbean plate for 2 million years during the Eocene–Oligocene boundary (33 million years ago), which led the presently-submerged Aves Ridge in the eastern Caribbean Sea to rise and connect South America with Puerto Rico via an unbroken land bridge; Puerto Rico is posited to have been further connected via dry land to Hispaniola, Cuba and eastern Jamaica. During this period the ice sheet expanded on Antarctica, causing the global sea level to drop. MacPhee and Iturralde-Vinent proposed that the ancestors of the non-flying land vertebrates that inhabit, or used to inhabit, the Greater Antilles arrived from South America by walking along this bridge rather than through oceanic dispersal.

== Debate ==
The GAARlandia hypothesis is controversial in the scientific community. It has been supported by studies of individual lineages, but simultaneous colonization by multiple lineages is yet to be proven. Alonso et al. (2011) firmly argued in favor of the hypothesis: they found out in a phylogenetic research that the common ancestor of the toads of the genus Peltophryne, which do not tolerate saltwater, arrived on the Greater Antilles 33 million years ago–exactly when GAARlandia is supposed to have connected the present-day islands to South America. Other taxa found to have arrived at the time GAARlandia is said to have existed include cichlids, Eleutherodactylus and Osteopilus frogs, butterflies, Polistinae wasps, spiders with limited dispersal ability, extinct primates and Megalocnidae sloths, multiple bat groups, and hystricognath rodents.

Weaver et al. (2016) posited that GAARlandia might have enabled Limia, freshwater fish endemic to the islands, to reach the Antilles through a combination of dispersal, vicariance, and island hopping. Weaver et al. note, however, limias and all other native Antillean species are tolerant of saltwater, and conclude that intolerant species (such as primary division freshwater fish and caecilians) would have colonized the islands as well if a land bridge had been sufficient. Weaver et al. note that mammals which may have walked across GAARlandia, including megalonychid sloths, were capable of crossing short stretches of saltwater as well.

Ali & Hedges (2021) found "weak and non-existent" support for GAARlandia, respectively, in the colonization record of land vertebrates and the geological and seismic data, finding no geological evidence that the Aves Ridge formed a continuous landbridge during the Eocene-Oligocene, with them suggesting the central and southern parts of the landbridge were submerged at this time. They conclude that oceanic dispersal is "the best available explanation" for the origin of all Greater Antillean species, including plants and invertebrates.

== Related hypotheses ==
While the presence of an Aves Ridge land bridge has been disputed for the Eocene-Oligocene interval, the Aves Ridge has also been proposed to have facilitated dispersal between North and South America during the Late Cretaceous and Paleocene, when the ridge is suggested to have been exposed.
