= Limia yaguajali =

Scientific classification
- Kingdom: Animalia
- Phylum: Chordata
- Class: Actinopterygii
- Division: Teleostei
- Order: Cyprinodontiformes
- Family: Poeciliidae
- Genus: Limia
- Species: L. yaguajali

Binomial name
- Limia yaguajali Rivas, 1980

Species of fish

Limia yaguajali is found in Hispanola. It is a livebearing fish in the family Poeciliidae.

== Etymology ==
It named after the Río Yaguajal, in the Dominican Republic, the type locality.
