= Limia miragoanensis =

Scientific classification
- Kingdom: Animalia
- Phylum: Chordata
- Class: Actinopterygii
- Division: Teleostei
- Order: Cyprinodontiformes
- Family: Poeciliidae
- Genus: Limia
- Species: L. miragoanensis

Binomial name
- Limia miragoanensis Rivas, 1980

Species of fish

Limia miragoanensis is found in Hispanola. It is a livebearing fish in the family Poeciliidae.

== Etymology ==
It named after Lake Miragoâne, Haiti, where it is endemic to that lake.
