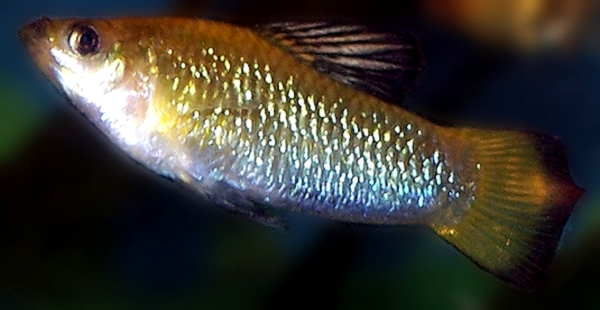
- A male
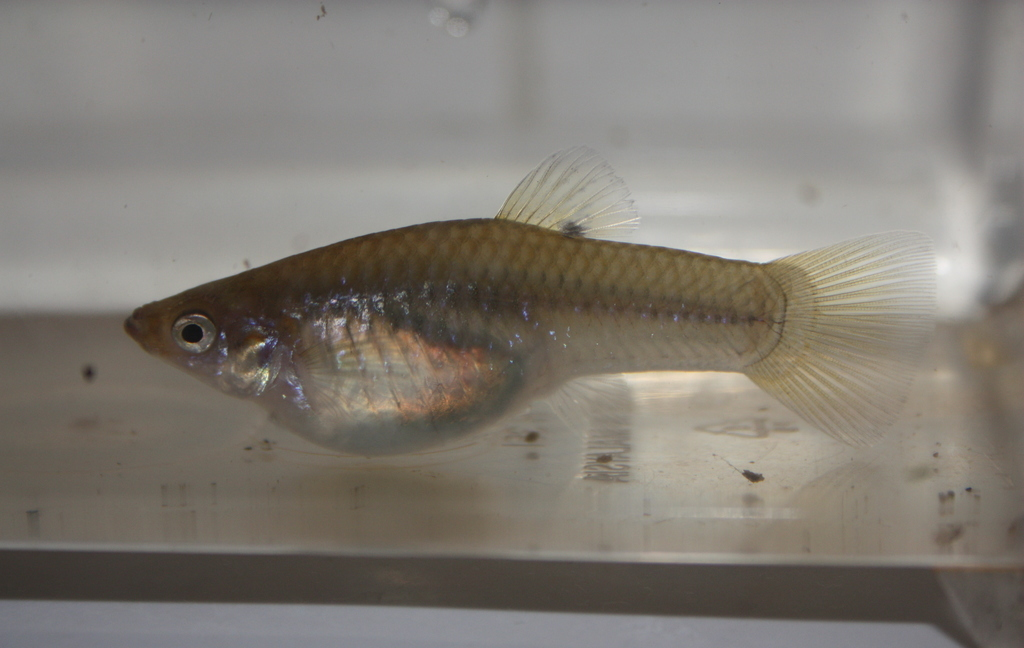
- A female

Conservation status
- Least Concern (IUCN 3.1)

Scientific classification
- Kingdom: Animalia
- Phylum: Chordata
- Class: Actinopterygii
- Division: Teleostei
- Order: Cyprinodontiformes
- Family: Poeciliidae
- Genus: Limia
- Species: L. perugiae

Binomial name
- Limia perugiae (Evermann & H. W. Clark, 1906)

Synonyms
- Platypoecilus perugiae Evermann & Clark, 1906; Poecilia perugiae (Evermann & Clark, 1906)

= Perugia's limia =

Species of fish

Perugia's limia (Limia perugiae) is a poeciliid fish endemic to the Caribbean island of Hispaniola. It is one of the most widespread species in the Limia genus, inhabiting waters ranging from fresh to hypersaline. Unlike most Limia species, L. perugiae is omnivorous. Dominant males are especially colorful. Females give birth to live young.

== Taxonomy ==
L. perugiae was described as Platypoecilus perugiae in 1906 by Barton Warren Evermann and Howard Walton Clark with a type locality given as a small stream in the San Francisco Mountains of the Dominican Republic. The specific name honors the Italian ichthyologist Alberto Perugia (1847–1897) of the Museo Civico di Storia Naturale di Genova in recognition of his work on West Indian fishes.

== Description ==
L. perugiae populations inhabiting the hypersaline localities of Lago Enriquillo, Laguna de Oviedo, and Las Salinas are smaller and less colorful and have proportionally larger heads than those living in the nearby freshwater habitats. Freshwater males develop more distinct secondary sex characteristics, including a broader body and longer fins. The males from hypersaline populations have narrower bodies and a more juvenile appearance.

L. perugiae males are polymorphic for size, ranging in adulthood from 20 mm to 60 mm, and may be classified as large, intermediate, and small. The females show no such variation and average about 40 mm in adulthood. The cessation of growth is brought on by the onset of sexual maturity, which is in turn genetically determined but also influenced by environmental factors. In dominant males, the blue hues of the body are contrasted by the yellow caudal fin with a black margin and the black dorsal fin. The intensity of the coloration increases with the male's rank.

== Distribution and habitat ==
L. perugiae is endemic to the southeast of the island of Hispaniola in the Caribbean. It is the most widely distributed Limia species on the island and one of the most successful and broadly distributed Limia species altogether. It inhabits freshwater systems as well as saline and hypersaline lakes and coastal lagoons; and clear springs as well as polluted man-made ditches and muddy creeks.

== Diet ==
While Limia species tend to feed primarily or exclusively on detritus and algae, particularly widespread species such as L. perugiae and L. zonata have more generalized, omnivorous feeding habits. L. perugiae has been found to take a moderate amount of terrestrial and aquatic invertebrates. The species expands its dietary niche in the wet season. It has the large gut length that is most commonly associated with the more herbivorous species, however, which suggests that it may adapt its diet to the various types of environments it inhabits.

== Reproduction ==
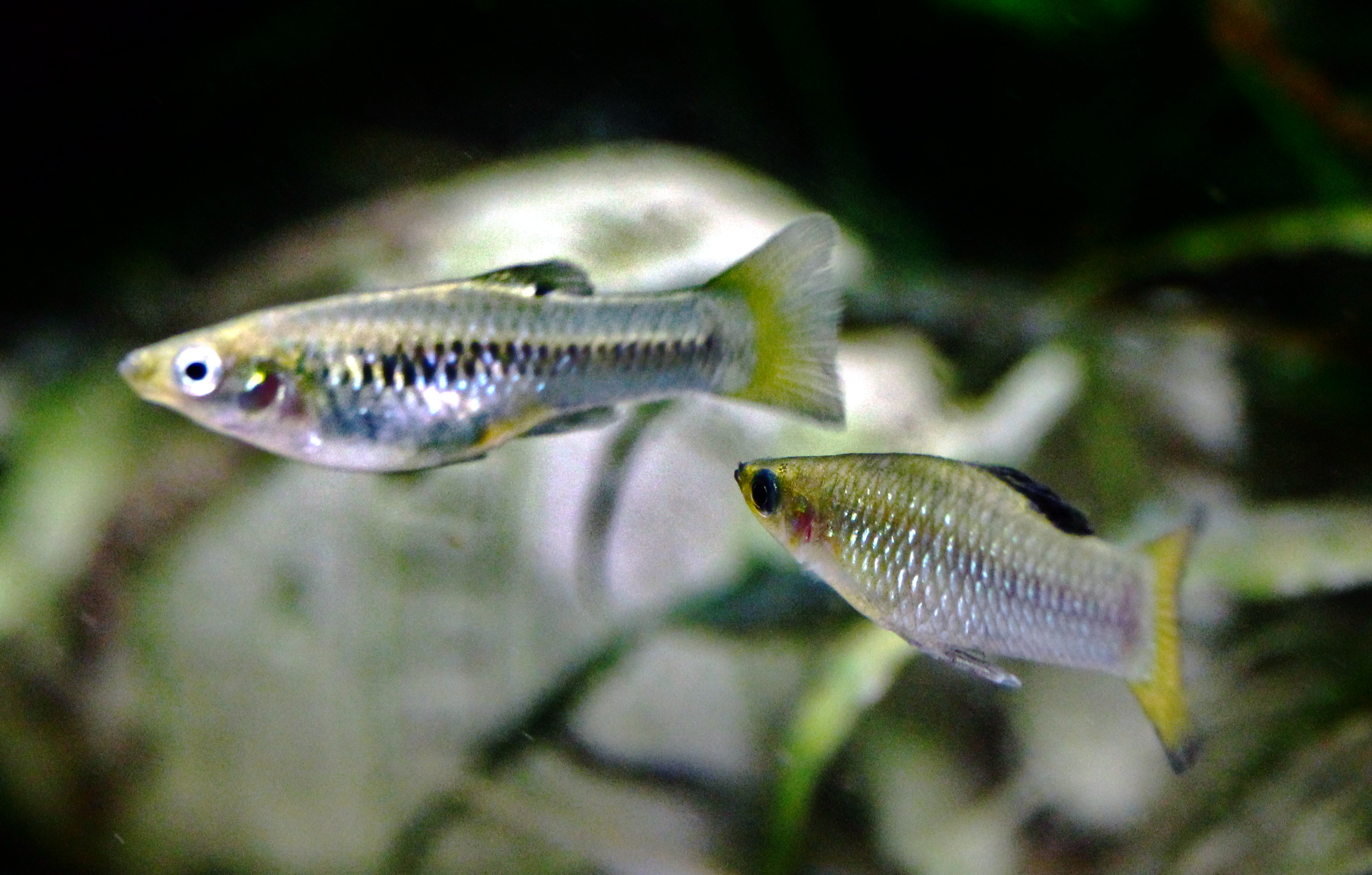
A male approaching a female

There tends to be the same number of males and females in a L. perugiae population. Males are not territorial. Large, dominant males spend most of their time competing with other males and courting females, whereas smaller males attempt to mate more often and exhibit a simpler sneaking behavior instead. Females do not discern between courting and non-courting males when choosing a mate. Instead, they have been observed to choose exclusively by body size, preferring larger males to smaller.

In smaller populations the larger males have greater reproductive success than the intermediate and small males. This success has been attributed by Schartl et al. to the larger males' dominance and courtship behavior. In larger populations, however, the large males fail to reproduce altogether, and it is the intermediate males who are the most successful at mating. Schartl et al. believe this to be due to dominant males in large populations spending time fighting amongst themselves and less time attempting to mate, allowing the subordinate males to pursue females freely.

L. perugiae is a livebearer. Like other livebearers, this species provides no parental care. It produces a large number of offspring, most of which fall prey to predators; only few survive to adulthood.
