= Land bridge =

Connection between two landform bodies

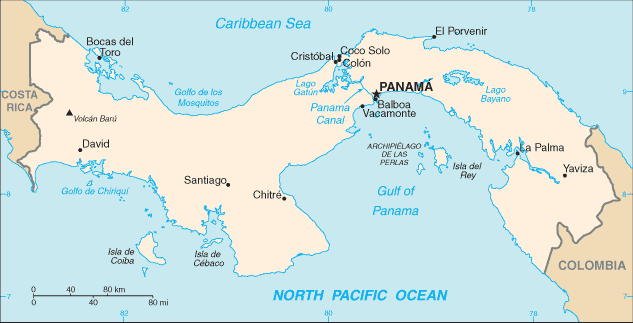
The Isthmus of Panama is a land bridge whose appearance 3 million years ago closed the Central American Seaway and enabled the Great American Biotic Interchange, in which animals and plants from the north colonized the south, and vice versa.

In biogeography, a land bridge is an isthmus or wider land connection between otherwise separate areas, over which animals and plants are able to cross and colonize new lands. A land bridge can be created by marine regression, in which sea levels fall, exposing shallow, previously submerged sections of continental shelf; or when new land is created by plate tectonics; or occasionally when the sea floor rises due to post-glacial rebound after an ice age.

== Prominent examples ==
Map of Sahul and Sunda, land masses that have provided land bridges at various points throughout the Pleistocene

Notable past (purple) and current (orange) land bridges on a bathymetric equirectangular projection centred on 45° E

=== Former land bridges ===
- The Bassian Plain, which linked Mainland Australia to Tasmania
- The Antarctic Land Bridge, which connected Antarctica, Australia, and South America during the Late Cretaceous and Early Paleogene
- The Bering Land Bridge (aka Beringia), which intermittently connected Alaska (Northern America) with Siberia (North Asia) as sea levels rose and fell under the effect of ice ages
- GAARlandia, a hypothesized land bridge which potentially connected the Greater Antilles with South America during the late Eocene or early Oligocene
- Land bridges of Japan, several land bridges which connected Japan to Russia and Korea at various times in history
- De Geer Land Bridge, a route that connected Fennoscandia to northern Greenland
- Doggerland, a former landmass in the southern North Sea which connected the island of Great Britain to continental Europe during the last ice age
- The Thule Land Bridge, a now-vanished land bridge between the British Isles and Greenland
- Torres Strait land bridge, Sahul, between modern-day West Papua and Cape York
- Sundaland, a 1,800,000 km^{2} area which connected the islands of Southeast Asia at various points during the last 2.6 million years

=== Current land bridges ===
- Adam's Bridge (also known as Rama Setu), a very shallow series of shoals connecting India and Sri Lanka
- The Isthmus of Panama, whose appearance three million years ago allowed the Great American Biotic Interchange between North America and South America
- The Sinai Peninsula, linking Africa and Eurasia

== Land bridge theory ==
The botanist Joseph Dalton Hooker, noting similarities of the floras of Australia, New Zealand, and southern South America in his six-volume Flora Antarctica, published between 1844 and 1859, proposed that land bridges had once existed between these land masses.

In the late 19th and early 20th centuries, vanished land bridges were an explanation for observed affinities of plants and animals in distant locations. Such scientists as Joseph Dalton Hooker noted puzzling geological, botanical, and zoological similarities between widely separated areas, and proposed land bridges between appropriate land masses that allowed species to spread between land masses. In geology, the concept was first proposed by Jules Marcou in Lettres sur les roches du Jura et leur distribution géographique dans les deux hémisphères ("Letters on the rocks of the Jura [Mountains] and their geographic distribution in the two hemispheres"), 1857–1860.

Hypothesized land bridges included:

- Archatlantis from the West Indies to North Africa
- Archhelenis from Brazil to South Africa
- Archiboreis in the North Atlantic
- Archigalenis from Central America through Hawaii to Northeast Asia
- Archinotis from South America to Antarctica
- Lemuria in the Indian Ocean

The theory of continental drift provided an alternate explanation that did not require land bridges. However the continental drift theory was not widely accepted until the development of plate tectonics in the early 1960s, which more completely explained the motion of continents over geological time.

== See also ==
- Habitat fragmentation
- Sea level rise
