= Limia immaculata =

Scientific classification
- Kingdom: Animalia
- Phylum: Chordata
- Class: Actinopterygii
- Division: Teleostei
- Order: Cyprinodontiformes
- Family: Poeciliidae
- Genus: Limia
- Species: L. immaculata

Binomial name
- Limia immaculata Rivas, 1980

Species of fish

Limia immaculata is found in Hispanola. It is a livebearing fish in the family Poeciliidae.

== Etymology ==
It name means = not; maculatus, or spotted, referring to the absence of crossbars, blotches, spots, mottling, and speckling on body.
