= Limia garnieri =

Scientific classification
- Kingdom: Animalia
- Phylum: Chordata
- Class: Actinopterygii
- Division: Teleostei
- Order: Cyprinodontiformes
- Family: Poeciliidae
- Genus: Limia
- Species: L. garnieri

Binomial name
- Limia garnieri Rivas, 1980

Species of fish

Limia garnieri is found in Hispanola. It is a livebearing fish in the family Poeciliidae.

== Etymology ==
It is named in honor of Emmanuel Garnier, who as Director, of the Fisheries Service of Haiti (where this species is endemic), gave his assistance during Rivas' 1951 expedition to Haiti, when the type specimen was collected.
