= Lake Miragoâne =

Haitian lake

- Location within Haiti
- Location: Haiti
- Coordinates: 18°24′14″N 73°2′59″W
- Basin countries: Haiti
- Max. length: 12 km (7.5 mi)
- Surface area: 25 km^{2} (9.7 sq mi)

Lake Miragoâne (French: Étang de Miragoâne) is a lake in Haiti, located one kilometer southeast of the city of Miragoâne. It is one of the largest natural freshwater lakes in the Caribbean. The lake is 12 km (7.5 mi) long and 25 km^{2} (9.7 sq mi) in area.

== Fauna ==
Many species of water bird inhabit Lake Miragoâne including the snowy egret (Egretta thula), the West Indian whistling duck (Dendrocygna arborea), the yellow-crowned night heron (Nyctanassa violacea) and the glossy ibis (Plegadis falcinellus).

Lake Miragoâne is also considered an important centre of endemism for the livebearing genus Limia, with a total of 9 described species, the newest described species being Limia mandibularis.
