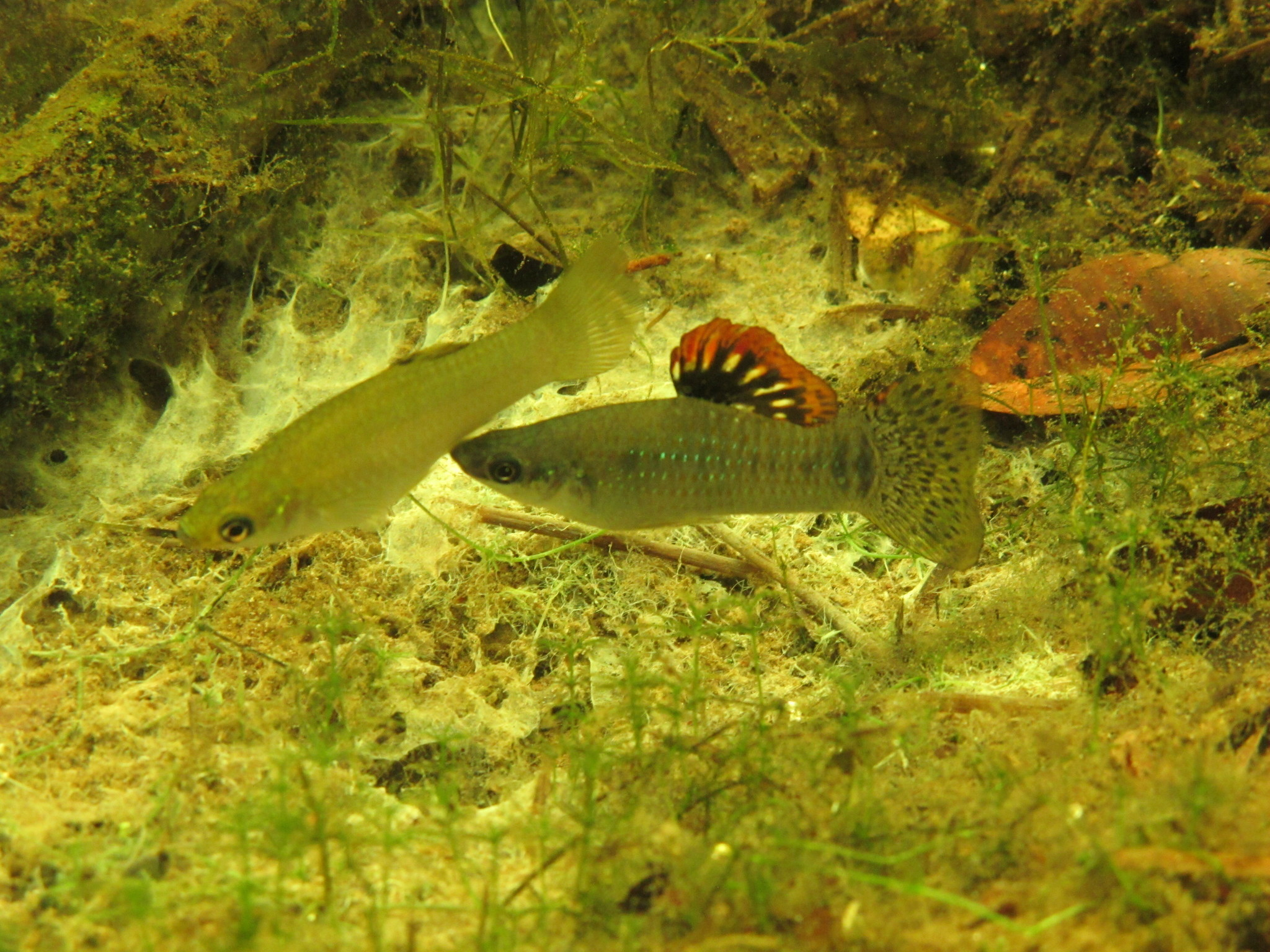
- A female (left) and a male (right) in the natural environment

Conservation status
- Least Concern (IUCN 3.1)

Scientific classification
- Kingdom: Animalia
- Phylum: Chordata
- Class: Actinopterygii
- Order: Cyprinodontiformes
- Family: Poeciliidae
- Genus: Poecilia
- Species: P. orri

Binomial name
- Poecilia orri Fowler, 1943

Synonyms
- Poecilia vetiprovidentiae Fowler, 1950

= Poecilia orri =

Mangrove molly

Species of livebearer fish

Poecilia orri, the mangrove molly, is a brackish-water livebearer fish from Central America. Two morphs exist, differing in size, body shape, and coloring.

== Description ==
Two morphs of the mangrove molly exist: P. orri "orri" and P. orri "vetiprovidentiae". The former is smaller, has no visible markings on its body, and only has a little black spot on its dorsal fin. The medium-size P. orri "vetiprovidentiae" is a larger and deeper-bodied morph with a spotted dorsal fin. Alpha males of the latter morph normally have a humeral spot and a red or yellow dorsal fin. Both sexes differ between the morphs. Intermediate forms have not been reported.

== Taxonomy ==
P. orri was first described by Henry Weed Fowler, who in 1943 found them on Bonacca Island. A few years later, Fowler described P. vetiprovidentiae from Old Providence Island. Donn Eric Rosen and Reeve Maclaren Bailey (1963) regarded both as synonyms of P. sphenops. In 1983, Robert Rush Miller revalidated P. orri as a distinct species and made P. vetiprovidentiae its synonym.

P. orri belongs to the shortfin molly (P. mexicana) complex in the subgenus Mollienesia. P. gillii, P. mexicana, and P. butleri are closely related to P. orri. P. vandepolli is very similar and may be identical to P. orri.

== Distribution and habitat ==
P. orri is distributed from the eastern side of the Yucatán Peninsula in the Mexican states of Yucatan and Quintana Roo through Belize to northern Honduras, including Bay Islands and Hog Island, as well as Colombia's Old Providence Island.

The preferred habitats of P. orri are coastal lagoons, coral reefs, ponds, and river mouths. In creeks close to Belize City it occurs with the closely related P. mexicana. Although essentially a brackish water species, it can live and reproduce in both freshwater and saltwater habitats. The two morphs, P. orri "orri" and P. orri "vetiprovidentiae", occur in the same range but occupy different microhabitats.

== Behavior ==
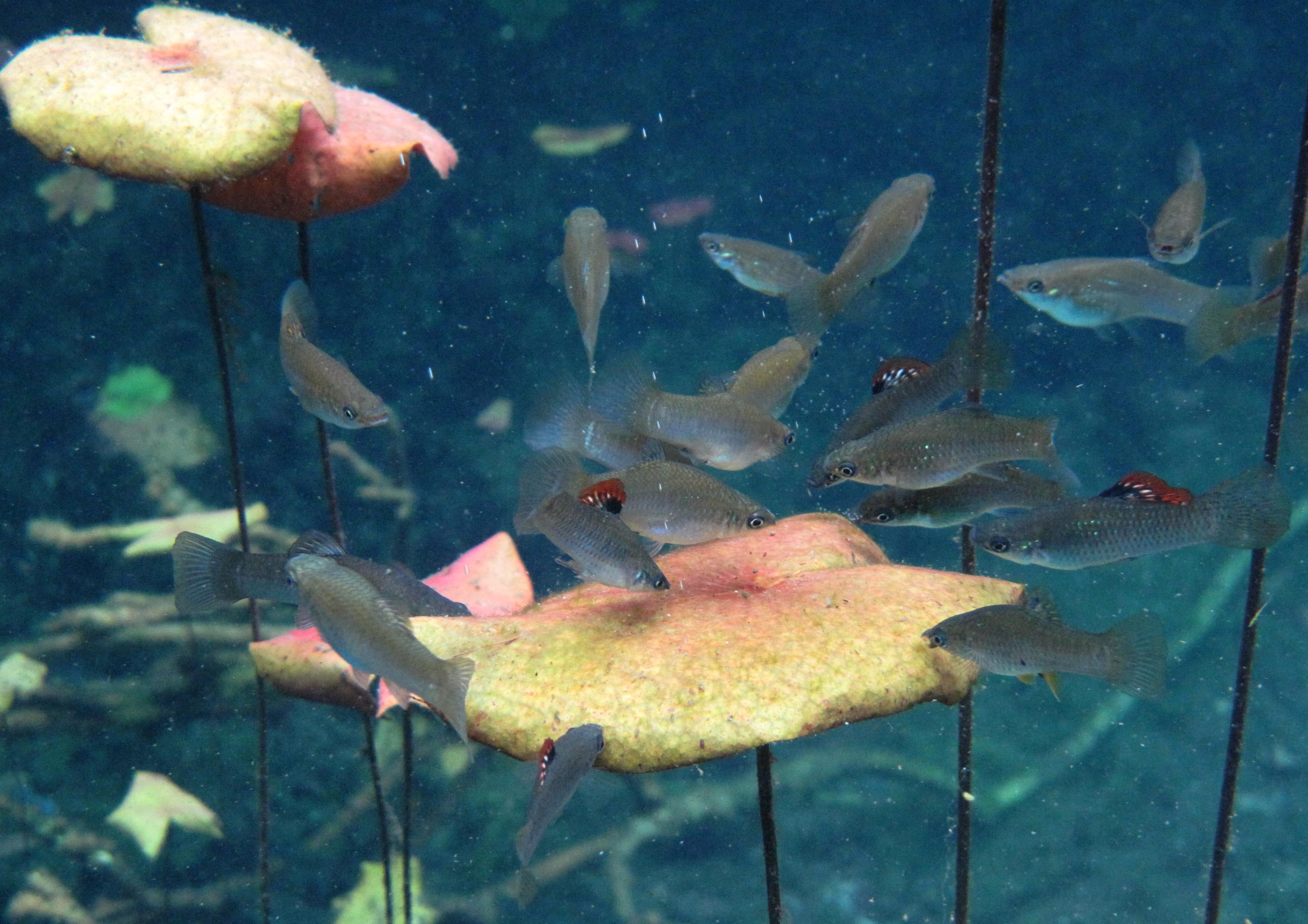
A mixed-sex group browsing on leaves

Gut analyses have shown mangrove mollies to be herbivorous. The fish feed on cyanobacteria. They form shoals near the substrate, where they browse, and stay close to shelter such as mangrove or floating algae. In the cenotes along the Riviera Maya the species is found alongside the livebearer Gambusia yucatana, catfish Rhamdia quelen, and a Rocio cichlid.

Males do not court females but rely exclusively on "sneaky" forced copulations.
