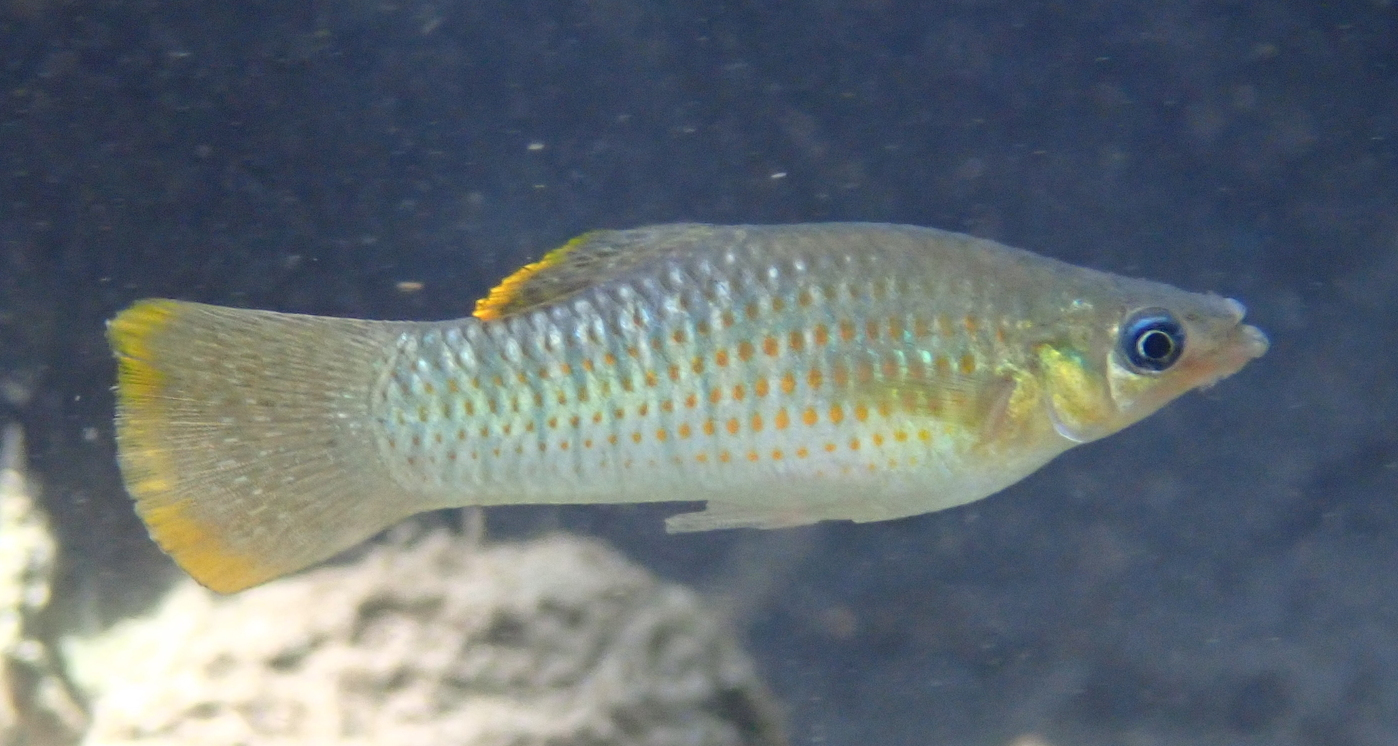
- A male

Conservation status
- Data Deficient (IUCN 3.1)

Scientific classification
- Kingdom: Animalia
- Phylum: Chordata
- Class: Actinopterygii
- Division: Teleostei
- Order: Cyprinodontiformes
- Family: Poeciliidae
- Genus: Poecilia
- Species: P. maylandi

Binomial name
- Poecilia maylandi (Meyer, 1983)

= Poecilia maylandi =

Balsas molly

Species of fish

Poecilia maylandi, also known as the Balsas molly or Mayland's molly, is a poeciliid fish native to Mexico.

P. maylandi belongs to short-fin mollies. It has not been the subject of any phylogenetic work, and may belong to either P. sphenops or P. mexicana species complexes. The specific epithet honors the fish photographer Hans J. Mayland.

Poecilia maylandi occurs in the basins of the Balsas and Aguililla rivers on the Pacific slope of Mexico. It lives in shallow freshwater habitats, including both streams and larger rivers. Although it can tolerate substantial variation in current speed, it tends to occupy the least turbulent areas, such as sheltered parts of pools and riffles. It has been recorded over a wide range of bottom types, from fine sediment and sand to gravel and exposed rock, occasionally with larger stones. Some habitats lack conspicuous aquatic plants, while others contain algae, emergent vegetation, Potamogeton, or water hyacinth. The water may be either clear or cloudy, but the species is usually found no deeper than about 1 m. In the dry season, these are reduced to residual pools.

Breeding males are predominantly black, including most of the body and the dorsal and caudal fins, while the caudal fin has an orange area near its tip. The species is known to reach at least 68 mm in standard length, although larger specimens have been reported, with females reaching 110 mm and males 90 mm in total length. The presence of young in collections from March to June provides evidence of reproduction during these months, but the species may breed for a substantially greater part of the year. Diatoms, filamentous algae, and phytoplankton are likely to be important foods, as they are in other mollies.

In the Balsas basin, Poecilia maylandi often occurs alongside P. butleri. Several physical features distinguish them. P. maylandi has three-cusped teeth along the inner jaw, whereas those of P. butleri are simple and cone-shaped. The two species also differ in the number of rays supporting their dorsal and anal fins: P. maylandi has eight dorsal and nine anal rays, compared with nine and eight in P. butleri. P. maylandi has 19-23 gill rakers (small structures lining the gills), compared with 23-29 in P. butleri. It also has 18 rows of scales around the peduncle (narrow part of the body just before the tail), compared with 16 in P. butleri. Other sympatric fish include Ilyodon lennoni and Poeciliopsis balsas.
