= Las Estacas Natural Reserve and Spa =

Mexican mineral spring and natural reserve

Las Estacas Natural Reserve and Spa (Spanish: Balneario Las Estacas) is a mineral spring, day spa and natural reserve located in the town of Tlaltizapan, in the state of Morelos, Mexico. The natural reserve is a protected area for plants and wildlife since 1998; the protected area has 652.17 hectares (1,611.5 acres) and harbors a first magnitude spring with a flow rate of 6,700 L/s.

== History ==
In 1940, Julio Calderon Fuentes acquired Las Estacas from Hacienda of Temilpa. In 1941, Calderon opened Las Estacas to tourists as a spa day and country ranch. The name of Las Estacas derives from its history when the residents dug stakes in the shore of the river to control the water level and water their fields. The reserve has been a protected area since 1998.

== Geography ==
The territory of the natural reserve and spa belongs to the Morelos-Guerrero Mesozoic basin which in the north adjoins with the Trans-Mexican Volcanic Belt and in the south, west and east is surrounded by the Sierra Madre del Sur. Las Estacas is in the town of Yautepec which is in the north central part of the state of Morelos, Mexico. The spring is in the valley of Yautepec, about 15 km in straight line to the SSW of the town of Yautepec and about 13 km to the south of Ticuman.

=== Climate ===
The normal temperature throughout the year is about 25 °C with a rainfall of 840 L/m^2. Subtropical and hot humid with winter not defined. The drought reaches its worst at the end of the autumn, the winter, and in the beginning of the spring. The rain season is in between the months of June and October.

== Flora and fauna ==
=== Flora ===
Las Estacas has a great variety of flora and some of this are protected species such as cuachalate (Amphipterygium adstringens), cazahuate (Ipomoea wolcottiana), tepemezquite (Lysiloma divaricatum), pochote (Ceiba aesculifolia), pata de cabra (Wimmeria persicifolia, Bursera ariensis, Lysiloma tergemina), cuajiote amarillo (Bursera áptera), copal (B. copallifera) and cuajiote rojo (B. schlechtendalii).

=== Fauna ===
There are 132 species of birds, 10 species of fish and 8 species of mammals. Some also are protected species such as White-tailed deer (Odocoileus virginianus), Mexican spiny-tailed iguana (Ctenosaura pectinata), chupaflor barbón (Calothyorax pulcher), blue seedeater (Amaurospiza relicta), papamoscas pardooscuro (Xenotriccus mexicanus), Balsas molly (Poecilia maylandi), Twospot livebearer (Pseudoxiphophorus bimaculata), Banded tetra (Astyanax aeneus) and Balsas splitfin (Ilyodon whitei).

18°43′38.96″N 99°6′43.51″W
