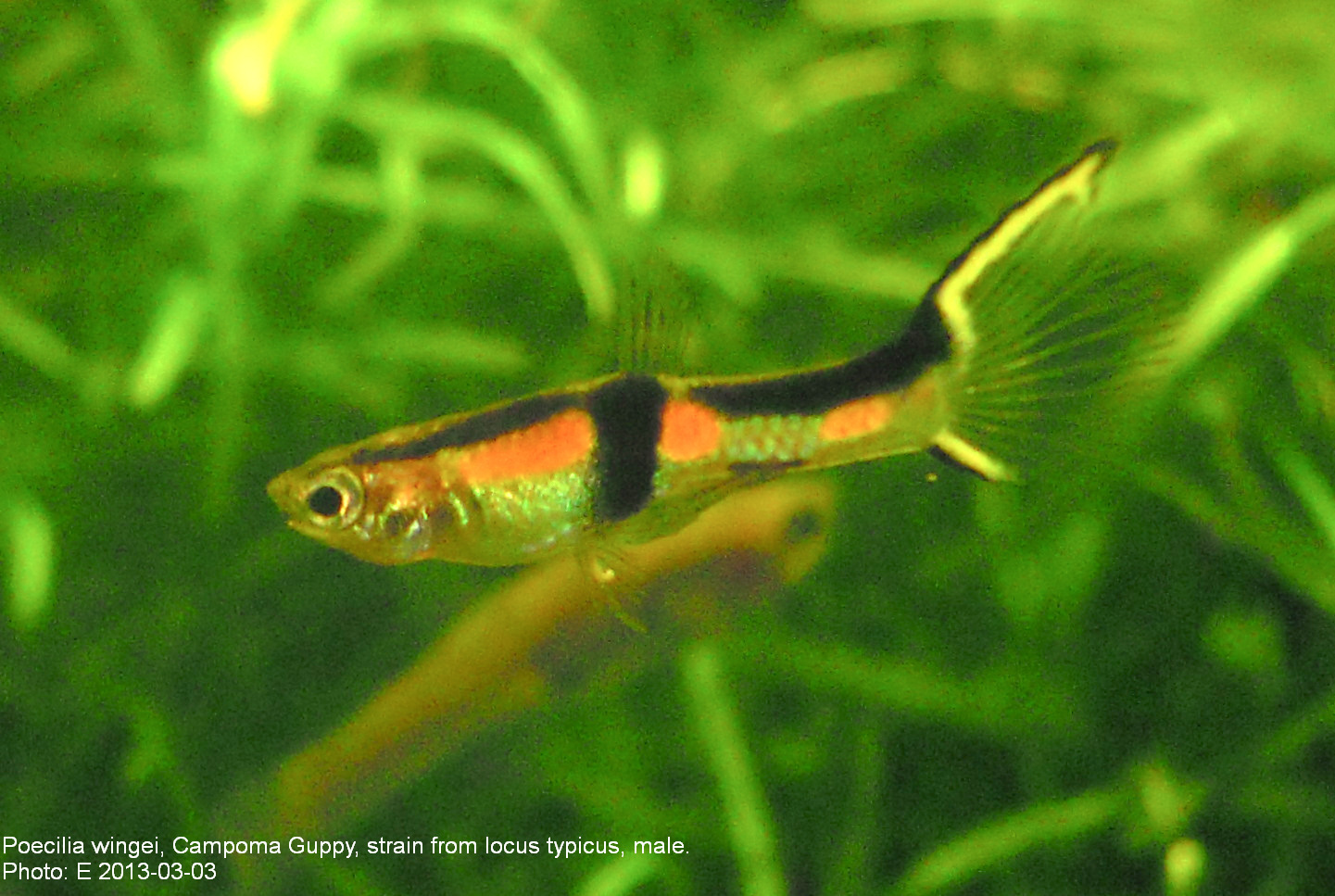
- Poecilia wingei, male from the Campoma type-locality population

Conservation status
- Endangered (IUCN 3.1)

Scientific classification
- Kingdom: Animalia
- Phylum: Chordata
- Class: Actinopterygii
- Division: Teleostei
- Order: Cyprinodontiformes
- Family: Poeciliidae
- Genus: Poecilia
- Species: P. wingei

Binomial name
- Poecilia wingei Poeser, Kempkes & Isbrücker, 2005

= Poecilia wingei =

Venezuelan fish

Poecilia wingei, known to aquarists as Endlers or Endler's livebearer, in the genus Poecilia, is a small fish native to the Paria Peninsula in Venezuela. They are prolific breeders and often hybridize with guppies. These very colorful hybrids are the easiest to find being offered in pet-shops, typically under the name Endler's guppy.

== History ==
Poecilia wingei is a very colorful guppy species, similar to the fancy guppy often found in pet shops. The species was first collected from Laguna de Patos in Venezuela by Franklyn F. Bond in 1937, and rediscovered by Dr. John Endler in 1975. The latter were the first examples of this fish to make it to the aquarium trade. More have been collected since then, notably by Armando Pou, to expand the captive breeding stock. The original Laguna de Patos population is threatened by runoff from a municipal garbage dump. Though it is rare in pet shops, this species is seen occasionally in the aquaria of enthusiasts.

In 2024 P. wingei was added to the IUCN Red List of endangered species. They are in danger of extinction in the wild as humans enter their natural habitat, releasing invasive species and polluting it. Hybridization with released P. reticulata also poses a high risk to them in their natural habitat.

According to Stan Shubel, the author of Aquarium Care for Fancy Guppies, the Endler guppy is, in fact, not a separate species; claiming it has the same genetic makeup as the common guppy, yet is given its own name, Poecilia wingei, for conservation purposes. However, in 2009 S. Schories, M. K. Meyer and M. Schartl published on the basis of molecular data that Poecilia wingei is a separated taxon at the species level from P. reticulata and P. obscura. In 2014 M. Herdegen et al. published a paper that refutes the assertions and conclusions made by S. Schories et al. concerning the status of Poecilia wingei as a species.

== Campoma Poecilia wingei ==
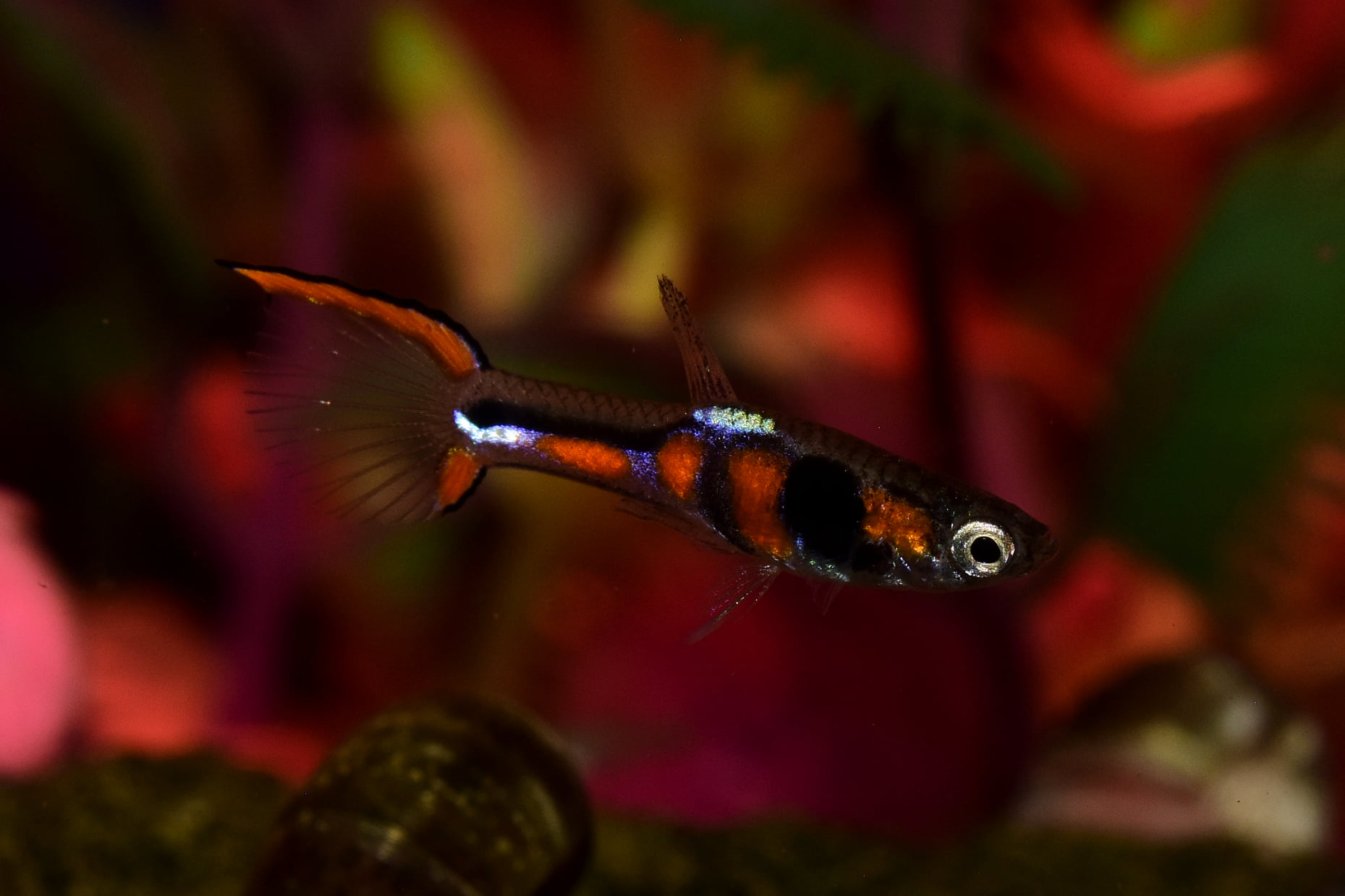
Poecilia wingei collected from the Campoma bridge location in Venezuela by Phil Voisin (Philderodez)

The first population of Poecilia to be given the name Poecilia wingei was discovered in 2005 in the Campoma region of Venezuela by Fred Poeser and Michael Kempkes. This population of P. wingei can be found in Laguna Campoma and in the lagoon's connected streams.

Most P. wingei from the Campoma region found in the hobby today are descended from those originally collected by Phil Voisin (Philderodez). The most popular collecting site in the Campoma region for P. Wingei has been the Campoma bridge location. P. wingei phenotypes collected from the Campoma bridge location are identified by a numbering system from 1 through 70.

P. wingei from the Campoma region are also known as the Campoma guppy.

== Cumana Poecilia wingei ==
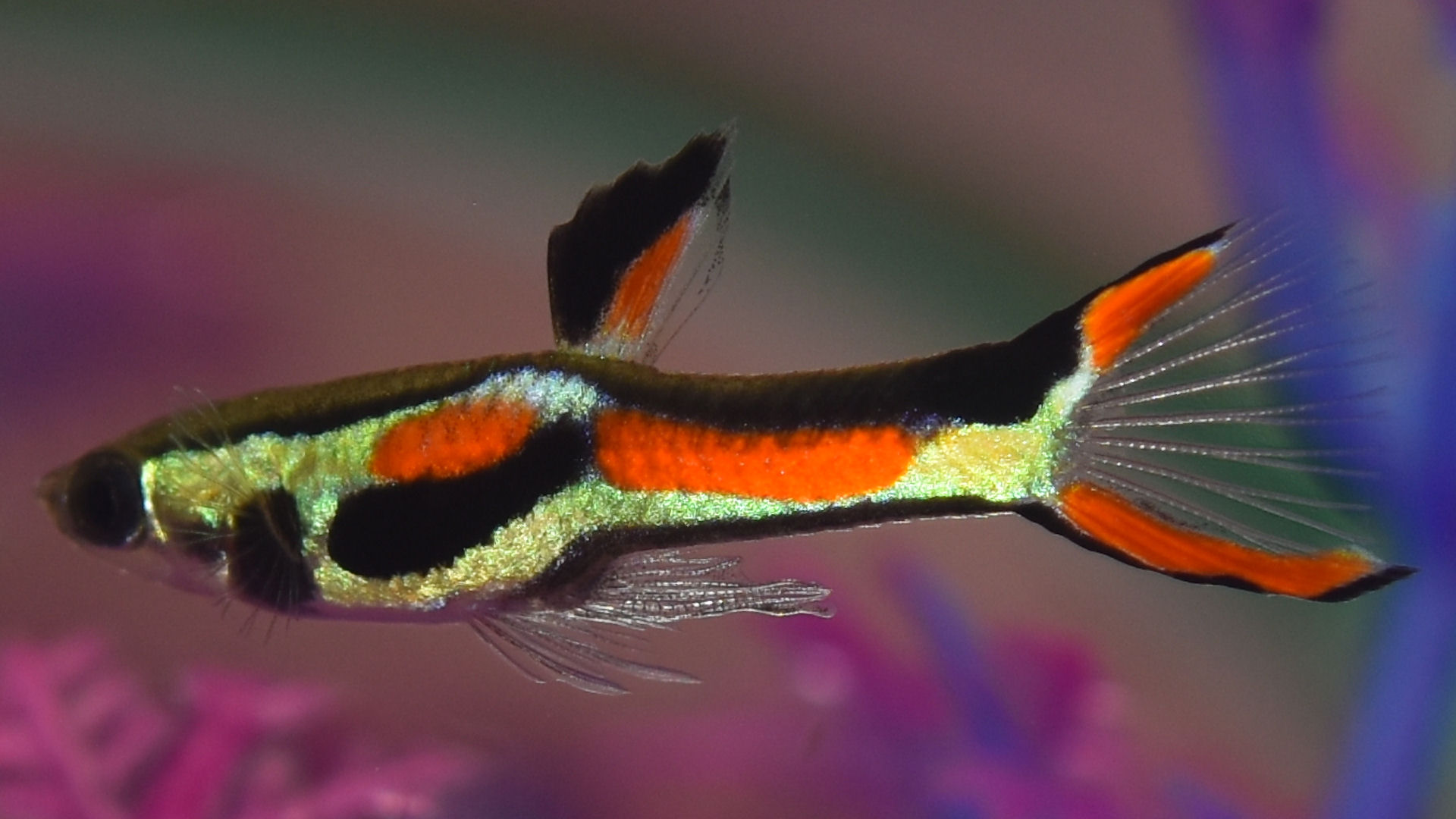
Poecilia wingei collected from Laguna Patos in the Cumana region by Armando Pau and line bred to become the black bar phenotype by Adrian Hernandez

Poecilia wingei from the Cumana region were originally known as Endler's guppy. Endler's livebearer, originally discovered in 1975 by John Endler and are found in Laguna Patos and in the lagoon's connected streams and canals, was actually a micropoecilia species that is believed to be extinct. In 2009 the Schories et al. publication broadened the definition of P. wingei to include Endler's livebearer. Most P. wingei from the Cumana region found in the hobby today are descended from those collected by Armando Pau and were line bred and distributed to hobbyists by Adrian Hernandez (AdrianHD).

P. Wingei from the Cumana region are also known as the Cumana guppy.

== El Tigre Poecilia wingei ==
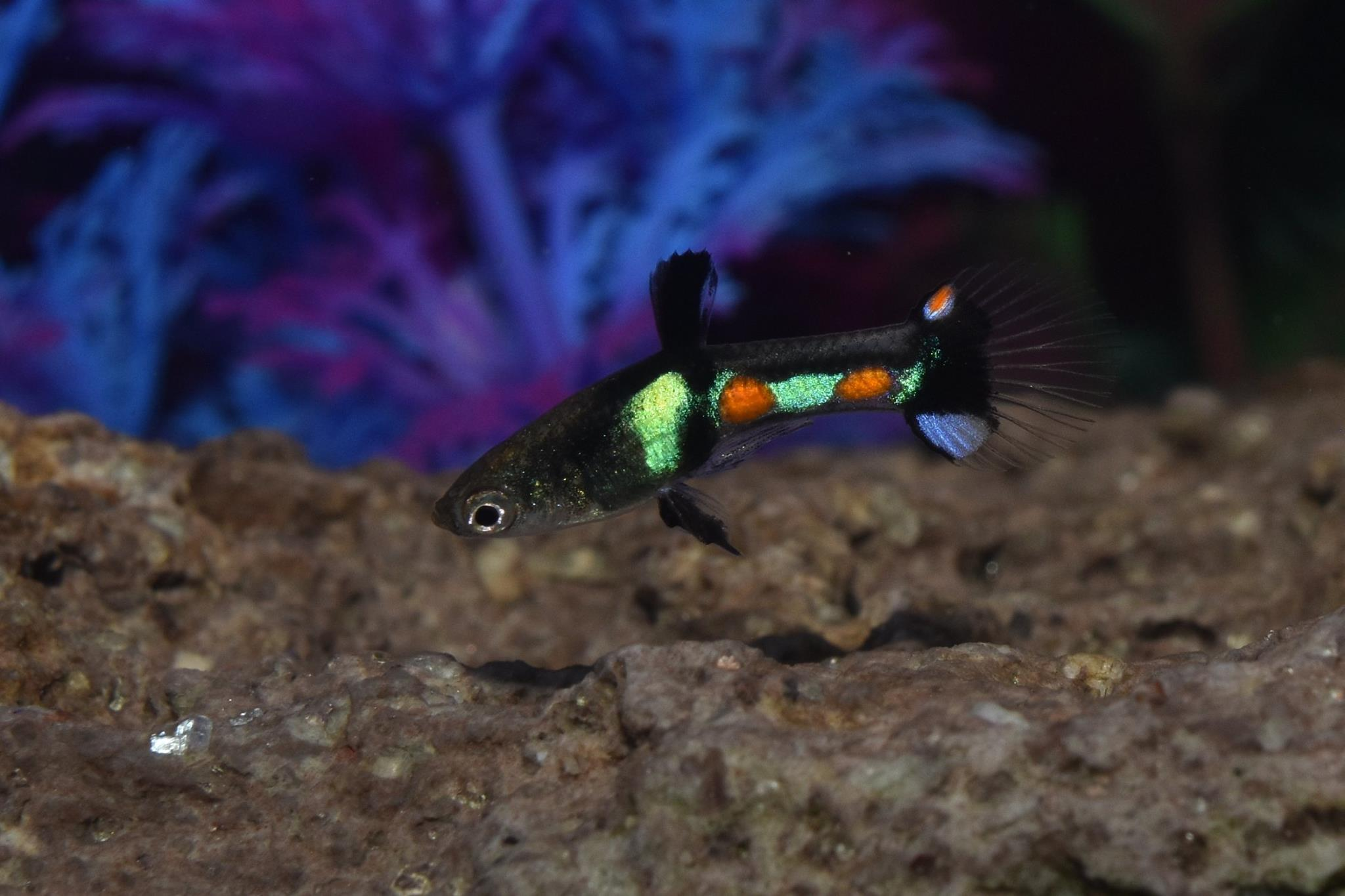
El Tigre collected from the El Tigre stream in the Campoma region of Venezuela by Phil Voisin (Philderodez)

El Tigre are Poecilia wingei collected from the El Tigre stream in the Campoma region of Venezuela. The El Tigre stream is not connected to Laguna Campoma so the El Tigre belong to their own distinct population. All El Tigre found in the hobby today are descended from those collected by Phil Voisin (Philderodez).

== Staeck Endler (hybrid) ==
The Staeck guppy was collected by Dr. Wolfgang Staeck in a creek around Laguna de los Patos in Cumana in 2004. Karen Koomans obtained a Staeck guppy male from the Hamburg University and identified it as pure Poecilia reticulata. Karen Koomans crossed this Staeck guppy male with a 'Yellow Top Sword' Endler female. She introduced the new line to the hobby as the 'Hamburg hybrid Endler strain'.

== Japan blue Endler (hybrid) ==
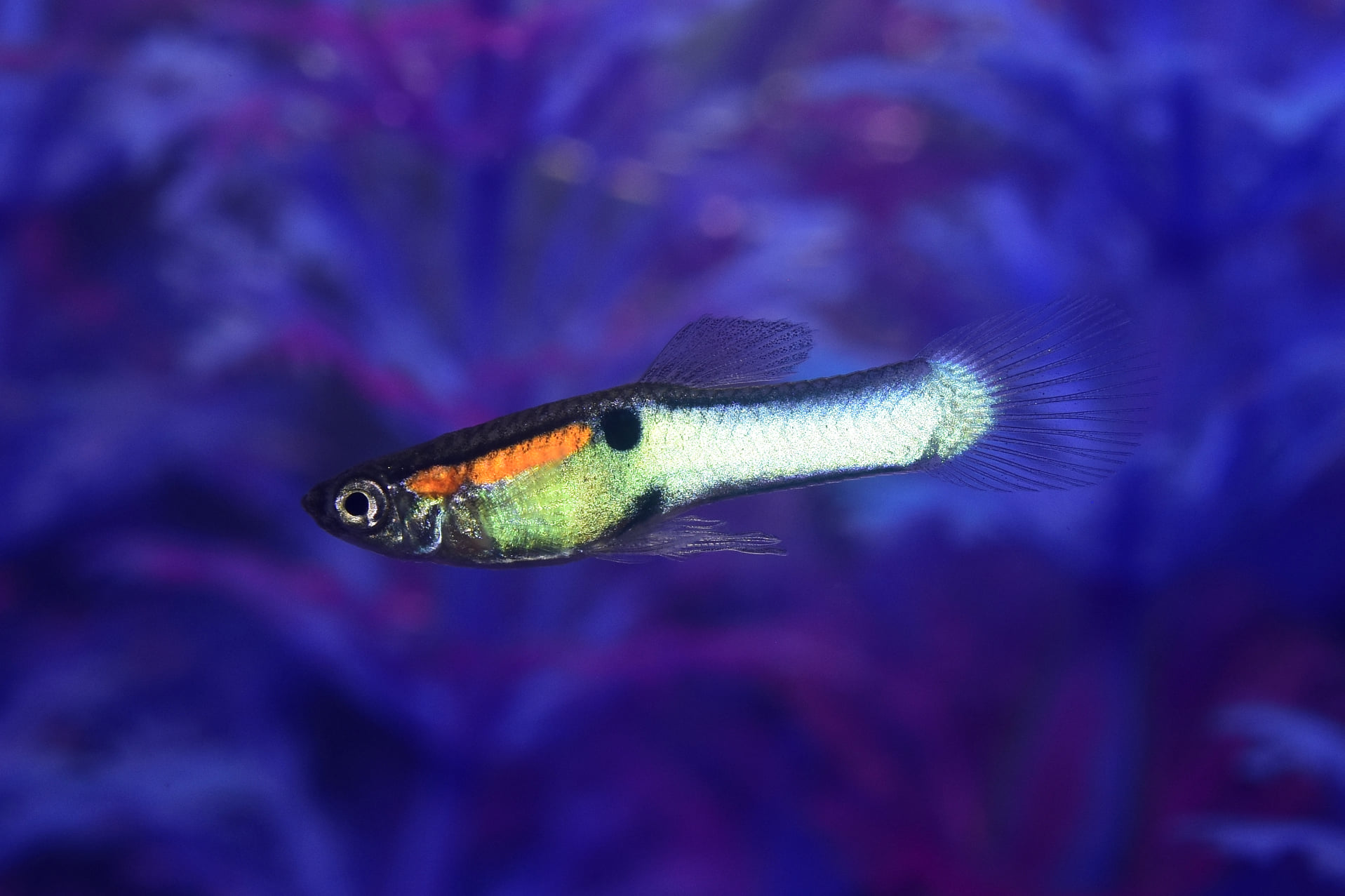
Japan blue wild type guppy (hybrid)

The original Japan blue wild type guppy was a Poecilia reticulata collected from Lac du Rorata. Lac du Rorota is a reservoir in French Guiana. Karen Koomans received a single male japan blue guppy and crossed it with Cumana Endler females to preserve the strain. Karen Koomans introduced this strain to the hobby as the 'Japan blue wild type guppy'.

== Hybrids ==
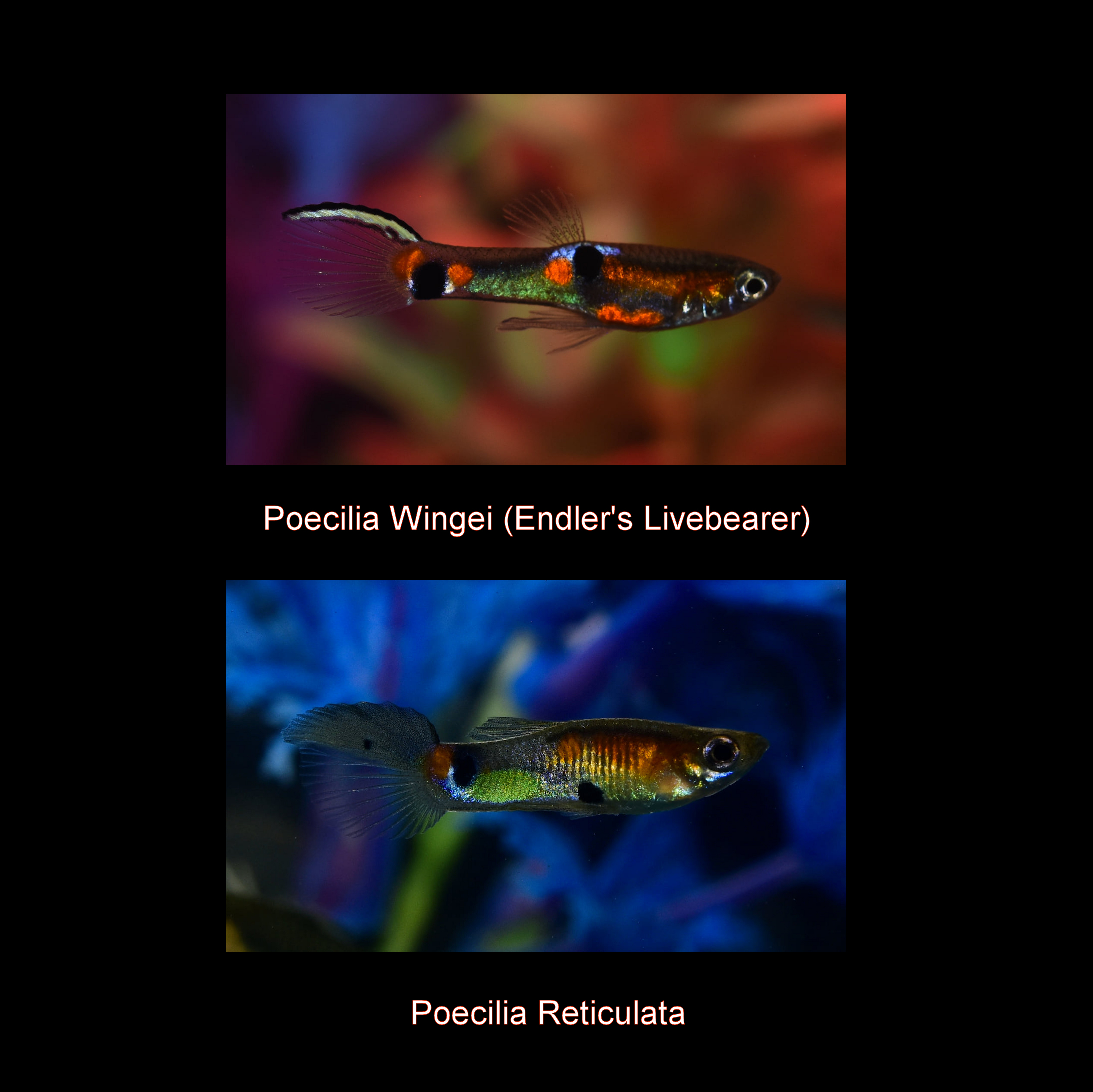
Comparison of Poecilia wingei collected from the Campoma bridge location with Poecilia reticulata

Endlers (P. wingei) can be crossed with guppy species (P. reticulata, P. obscura), and the hybrid offspring will be fertile. This is considered to dilute the gene pool and therefore is avoided by fish breeders who wish to maintain pure strains. Avid hobbyists maintain registry records to ensure their Endlers are purebred; undocumented fish sold in pet stores as Endler's livebearers are assumed to have some degree of guppy hybridization. In addition, as P. reticulata has been found in the same bodies of water as P. wingei, natural hybridization may also occur in the wild.

Hybridization with fancy guppy strains (selectively bred P. reticulata) often produces bright and colourful offspring. This has led to some hybrids being selectively bred themselves and becoming so common that they may be sold under any number of names such as peacock, snake, tiger, paradise, fancy, or sword Endler and sometimes as flame tail.

== In the aquarium ==
Though Poecilia wingei are hardy and undemanding as far as survival goes, proper aquascaping, diet, water parameters, tank mates, along with many other factors such as male to female ratios will determine the strength and appearance of a line.

== Breeding ==
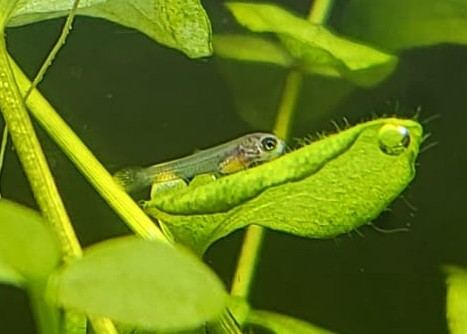
30 hours old Poecilia wingei

The colors of Endler's livebearer males are very intense, especially the black, orange, and metallic green colors. Their natural patterns are highly variable, though many display a double sword tail. Breeders have developed numerous lines displaying specific patterns and colors, such as red chest, black bar, peacock, yellow sword, etc.

They are prolific breeders like their guppy relatives. They give birth to live young approximately every 23 days. Fry "drops" can range in size from one to 30 babies (or possibly more, depending on several variables, including the age and size of the mother). Their first few hours of life will primarily be spent on the bottom of the tank, where they consume their yolk sacs. At this time they are most vulnerable to predators, including their own mothers and other Endler females (males seem less interested in cannibalism).

The fry can be fed powdered fry food, baby brine shrimp, and crushed flake food. They will also nibble on the layer of algae and microorganisms that forms on aquatic plants. Even adult brine shrimp are not beyond their capability, as several fry will gang up on a brine shrimp their own size and tear it apart.

The males will start to show color in approximately three to four weeks, but it can be several months before they develop the full depth and richness of color that characterizes Endlers. The colors of a male Endler will gradually intensify over the first six months of their lives. Tail extensions similar to that seen in a swordtail are not uncommon, but are much shorter. Most often, what appears to be a sword extension can be seen as intense coloring along the edge of an otherwise transparent tail. While giving the impression of a sword it turns out to just be good coloring.

Females will spend their entire lives with rather unexciting coloring. Depending on their environments, females will range from a pale silver to a dull, dark gold, but have the ability to change their coloring somewhat if they are moved from a light environment to a dark one (or vice versa). When full-grown, adult females can be as much as twice the size of males.

The birth process can be stressful for the females, and some will not survive long after large births. The ones that do not do well will often turn grey and will start to "wither away" until they eventually die, due to the stress.

== Etymology ==
The specific name of Poecilia wingei honours the Danish biologist Øjvind Winge (1886–1964) who worked extensively on the genetics of Poecilia including this species.
