= Poecilia elegans =

Conservation status
- Near Threatened (IUCN 3.1)

Scientific classification
- Kingdom: Animalia
- Phylum: Chordata
- Class: Actinopterygii
- Order: Cyprinodontiformes
- Family: Poeciliidae
- Genus: Poecilia
- Species: P. elegans

Binomial name
- Poecilia elegans (Trewavas, 1948)

Synonyms
- Mollienesia elegans Trewavas, 1948

Species of fish endemic to the Dominican Republic

Poecilia elegans, the elegant molly, is a species of freshwater fish in the family Poeciliidae. It is endemic to the Dominican Republic.

== Description ==
Males can reach a total length of 3.6 cm and females can reach up to 4.6 cm
