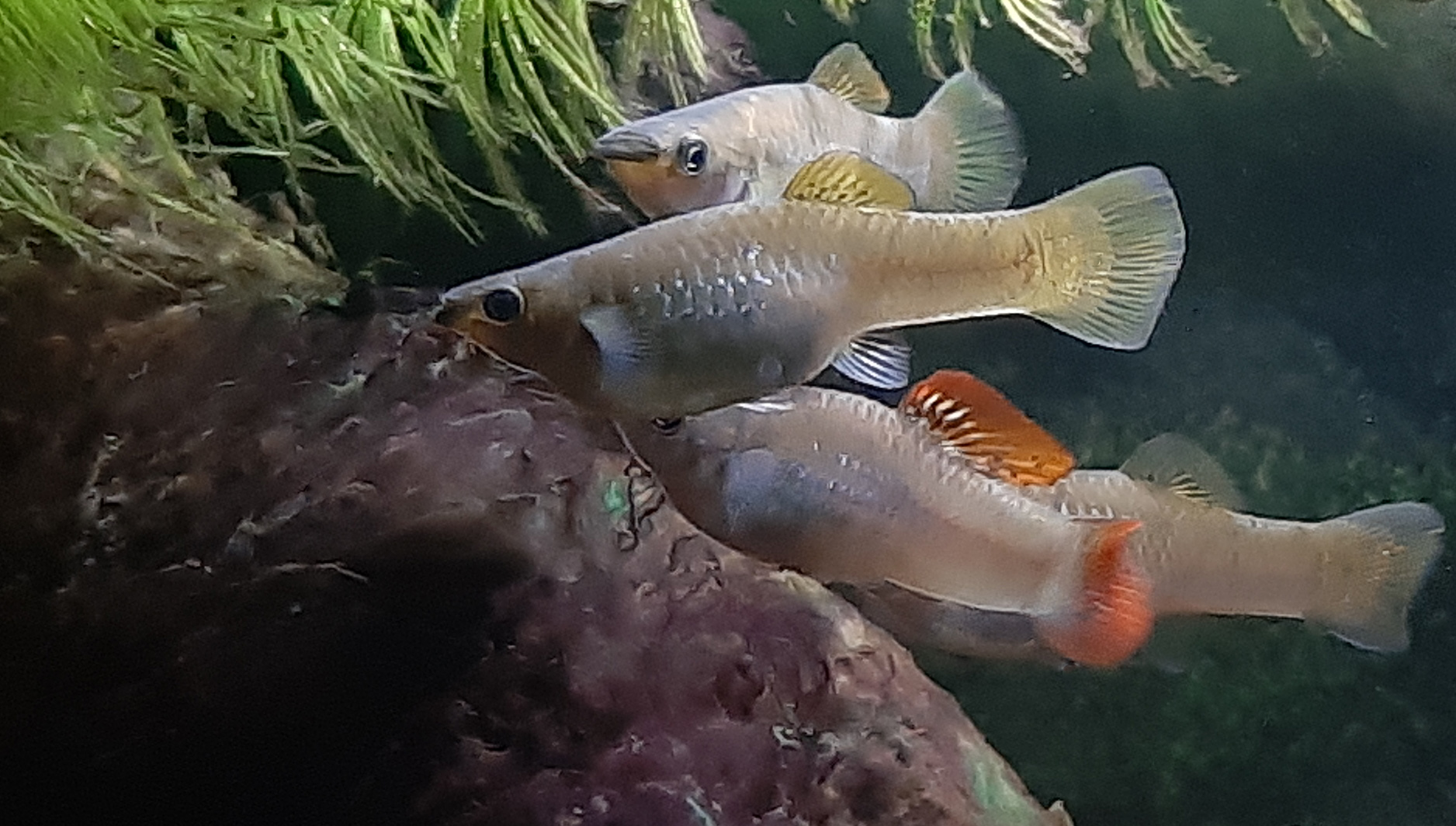

Scientific classification
- Kingdom: Animalia
- Phylum: Chordata
- Class: Actinopterygii
- Order: Cyprinodontiformes
- Family: Poeciliidae
- Genus: Poecilia
- Species: P. salvatoris

Binomial name
- Poecilia salvatoris Regan, 1907

= Liberty molly =

Species of fish

The liberty molly (Poecilia salvatoris) is a fish species from El Salvador. It is one of the short fin molly species in the Poecilia sphenops complex, and had been often regarded as synonymous with P. sphenops until recently.

Males and females are colored similarly, but the males' coloration is stronger. The body is silvery but speckled with blue and orange. The fins contain black and blue as well as either red or yellow. The red color version is probably the source for the common name "liberty molly" as a result of the combination of red, white and blue colors. Maximum length is about 3 inches (7.6 cm), with females generally larger than males.

According to Dr. William T. Innes, who regarded the species as color variety of P. sphenops, the liberty molly was first imported for the aquarium hobby in 1935. In the aquarium, the liberty molly can be aggressive towards other tankmates and nip the fins of other fishes in the tank. According to Innes, this aggressiveness and the loss of color intensity over captive generations led to the fish losing popularity in the hobby. Males in particular are aggressive towards each other. Tropical Fish Hobbyist recommends keeping the liberty molly in a species tank, in a ratio of at least two females per male, stating that three males and six females would be suitable in a 30-gallon aquarium. The liberty molly is prone to jumping, and so the tank should be covered. It needs vegetable matter in its diet.
