= Poecilia dauli =

Scientific classification
- Kingdom: Animalia
- Phylum: Chordata
- Class: Actinopterygii
- Division: Teleostei
- Order: Cyprinodontiformes
- Family: Poeciliidae
- Genus: Poecilia
- Species: P. dauli

Binomial name
- Poecilia dauli Meyer & Radda, 2000

Species of fish

Poecilia dauli is a species of fish in the family Poeciliidae, found in Venezuela.

== Etymology ==
It named in honor of German aquarist Günter Daul, known for collecting when he is on holiday in México and introducing into the hobby a strain of Xiphophorus helleri called "Yucatan".
