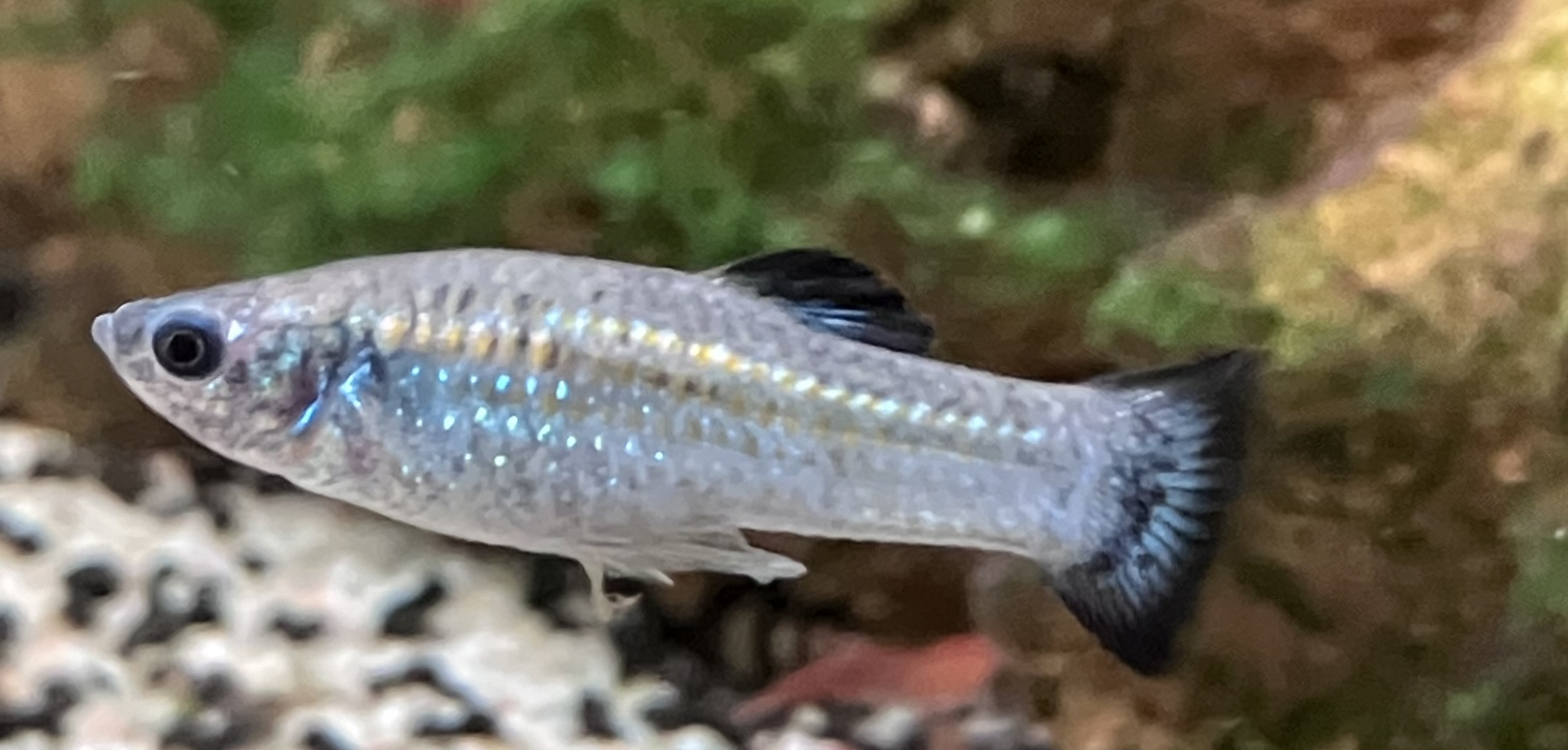
- A male
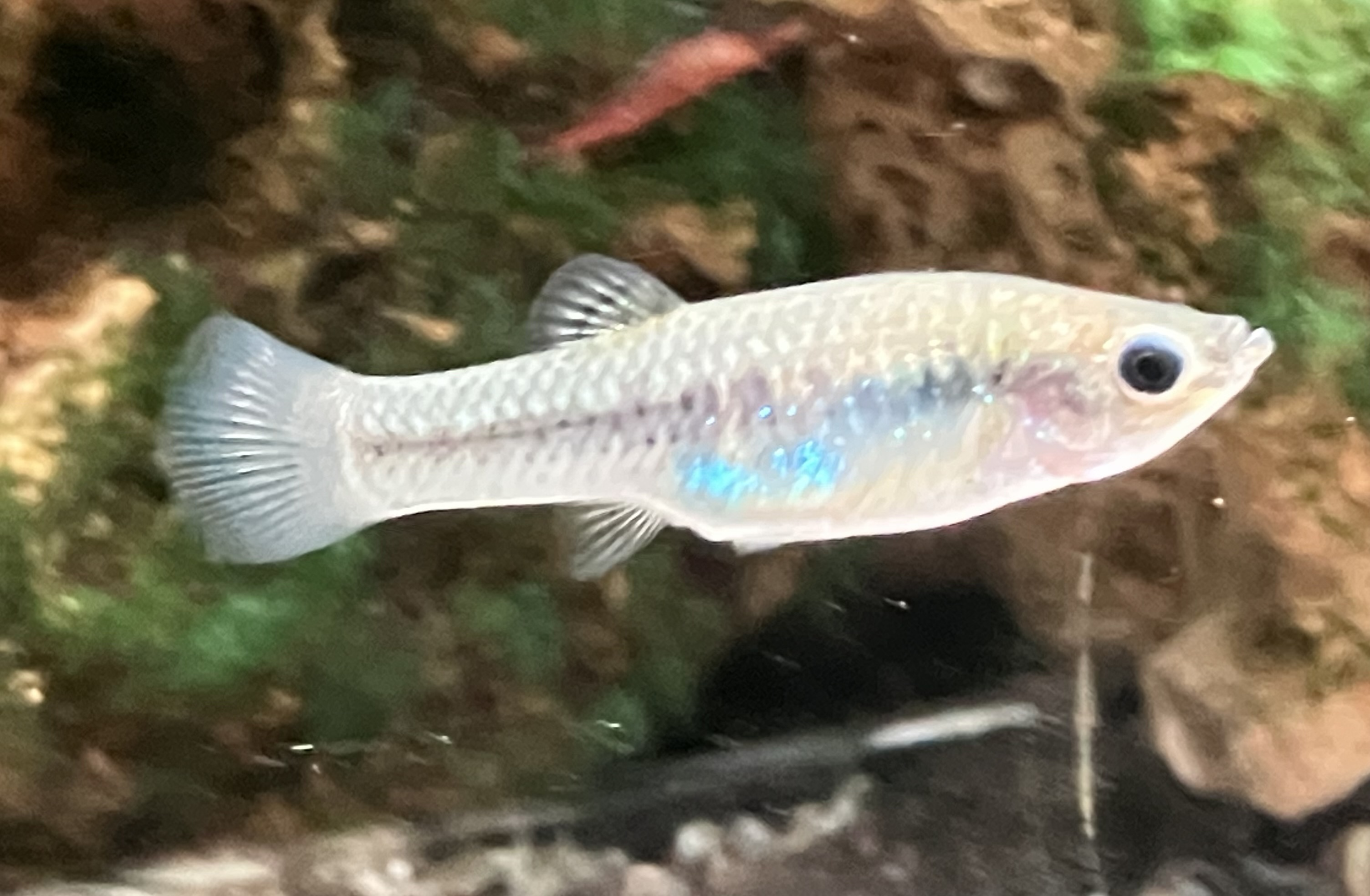
- A female

Conservation status
- Data Deficient (IUCN 3.1)

Scientific classification
- Kingdom: Animalia
- Phylum: Chordata
- Class: Actinopterygii
- Order: Cyprinodontiformes
- Family: Poeciliidae
- Genus: Poecilia
- Species: P. chica

Binomial name
- Poecilia chica Miller, 1975

= Poecilia chica =

Dwarf molly

Species of fish

Poecilia chica, the dwarf molly, is a livebearer fish from the Mexican state of Jalisco. The fish are small and exceptionally colorful. The dominant male may become completely black, which is a unique ability in the Mollienesia subgenus.

== Taxonomy ==
Poecilia chica has been known to science since 1939 and was subject to experiments in 1957, but was only formally described in 1975. It belongs to the Poecilia sphenops species complex.

P. chica is most closely related to the populations of P. sphenops inhabiting the waters of the Pacific slope of Central America. Miller presumes that P. chica evolved either from such a population of P. sphenops or from its progenitor.

The specific epithet comes from the Spanish word chica, meaning small and referring to the size of the species.

== Description ==
Females are the larger sex, growing to 42 mm. Generally lighter in color, they have up to six rows of orange spots on their sides and yellow to orange anal and dorsal fins. Some have turquoise-colored abdomens and golden-olive-colored backs.

Up to 30 mm long, males have longer fins and more intense colors, with black-margined dorsal and caudal fins and four or five rows of golden to orange spots on the sides of the body. The dominant male is especially colorful, with his entire body and the dorsal and caudal fins becoming black and the gonopodium orange. He also exhibits a purplish blue or turquoise sheen. The dominant male's striking color change is unique in the subgenus Mollienesia.

== Distribution and habitat ==
Poecilia chica is known only from Mexico's southwestern state of Jalisco, where it is found in three separate, small drainages on the Pacific slope: the Cutzamala River, the Purificación River, and a northern tributary to the Chacala River.

Poecilia chica inhabits low-elevation streams (approximately 250–450 m), typically slight during the dry season, flowing over substrates of sand, silt, rock, mud, leaves, and brush. Water clarity varies from clear to easily muddied. Juveniles inhabit quieter and shallower habitats featuring dense stands of vegetation such as Ceratophyllum, green algae, and water hyacinth. Adults prefer slowly flowing, 30-105 cm deep waters in the shade of trees and over rocky or gravelly bottom with only a sparse algal cover. The species shares its habitats with Poeciliopsis turneri, Ilyodon xantusi, and Xenotaenia resolanae.

== Reproduction ==
Poecilia chica is a livebearer, meaning that females give birth to live fry. Reproduction appears to be prolonged: females produce between 1 and 50 offspring per brood, with intervals ranging from 25 to 43 days in wild-caught females. Ffemales can be pregnant throughout much of the year, but more fry is produced in warmer months.
