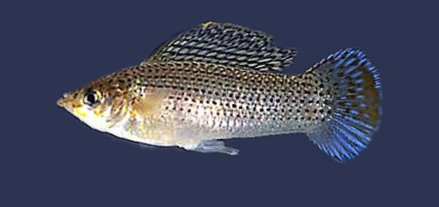
- Male sailfin molly (P. latipinna)

Scientific classification
- Kingdom: Animalia
- Phylum: Chordata
- Class: Actinopterygii
- Order: Cyprinodontiformes
- Family: Poeciliidae
- Subfamily: Poeciliinae
- Tribe: Poeciliini
- Genus: Poecilia; Bloch & J. G. Schneider, 1801

Type species
- Poecilia vivipara Bloch & J. G. Schneider, 1801

Species
- See text.

Synonyms
- Acanthophacelus Eigenmann, 1907; Allopoecilia Hubbs, 1924; Lebistes De Filippi, 1861; Lembesseia Fowler, 1949; Mollienesia Lesueur, 1821; Neopoecilia Hubbs, 1924; Pamphoria Regan, 1913; Parapoecilia Hubbs, 1924

= Poecilia =

Genus of fishes

Poecilia is a genus of fishes in the family Poeciliidae of the order Cyprinodontiformes. These livebearers are native to fresh, brackish and, saltwater in the Americas, and some species in the genus are euryhaline. A few have adapted to living in waters that contain high levels of toxic hydrogen sulfide (H_{2}S), and a population of P. mexicana lives in caves (other populations of this species are surface-living).

Some common and widespread species are often kept as aquarium fish, while others have very small ranges and are seriously threatened. Species in Poecilia are called mollies (e. g. P. sphenops) or guppies (e. g. P. reticulata) depending on body shape.

Micropoecilia has been proposed to be included as a subgenus of Poecilia.

== Taxonomy and etymology ==
Poecilia was first proposed as a genus in 1801 by the German naturalists Marcus Elieser Bloch and Johann Gottlob Theaenus Schneider when the described Poecilia vivipara as a new species. P. vivipara was subsequently designated as the type species of the genus by Pieter Bleeker in 1864. It is the type genus of the subfamily Poeciliinae and of the family Poeciliidae. Poecilia refers to the Greek word poikilos, which means "variegated" or "speckled", an allusion to the coloration and pattern of the type species, as well as that of and other related fishes, such as Fundulus heteroclitus which Bloch & Schneider classified in this genus.

== In aquaria ==
Fish of this genus have extremely variable coloration and have been selectively bred to create many different varieties. The most commonly kept species are guppies (P. reticulata), mollies (P. sphenops or P. latipinna), and Endler's livebearers (P. wingei). Members of the genus readily hybridize with each other and so most commercially offered fish are hybrids (with guppies having some Endler, and mollies being a mix of common and sailfin mollies).

They are easy to sex as males have a prominent gonopodium, a modified anal fin used to inseminate females. They mature quickly and breed readily, with females giving birth to a dozen or more fry every month. Some poecilids are cannibalistic and will eat any of their fry that are unable to flee in time (with females often eating the fry they just gave birth to, especially in a cramped aquarium setting).

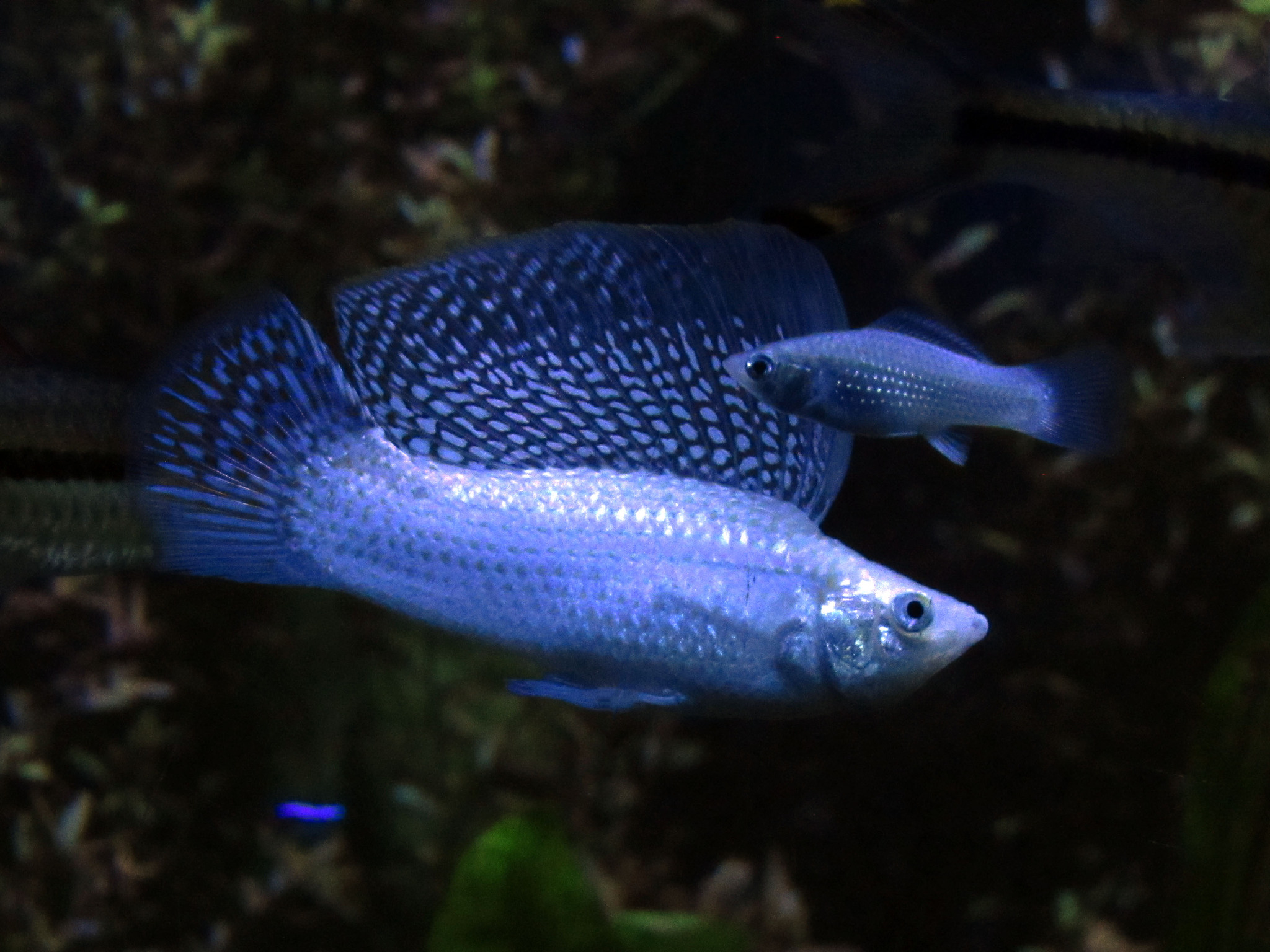
Fancy sailfin mollies

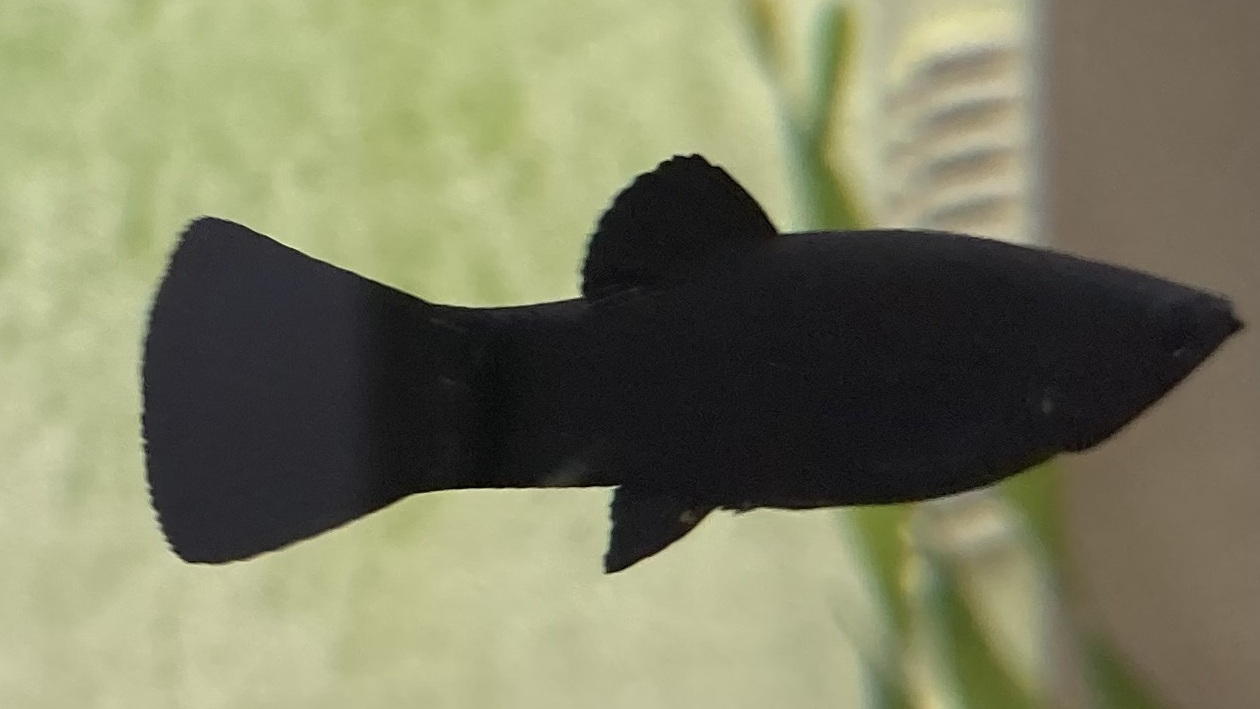
Black mollies

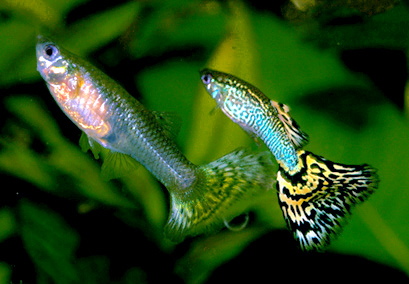
Fancy guppies

== Species ==
The following species are recognized in the genus Poecilia:

- Poecilia akroa Figueiredo & Moreira, 2018
- Poecilia araguaiensis (Costa, 1991)
- Poecilia bifurca (C. H. Eigenmann, 1909)
- Poecilia boesemani Poeser, 2003
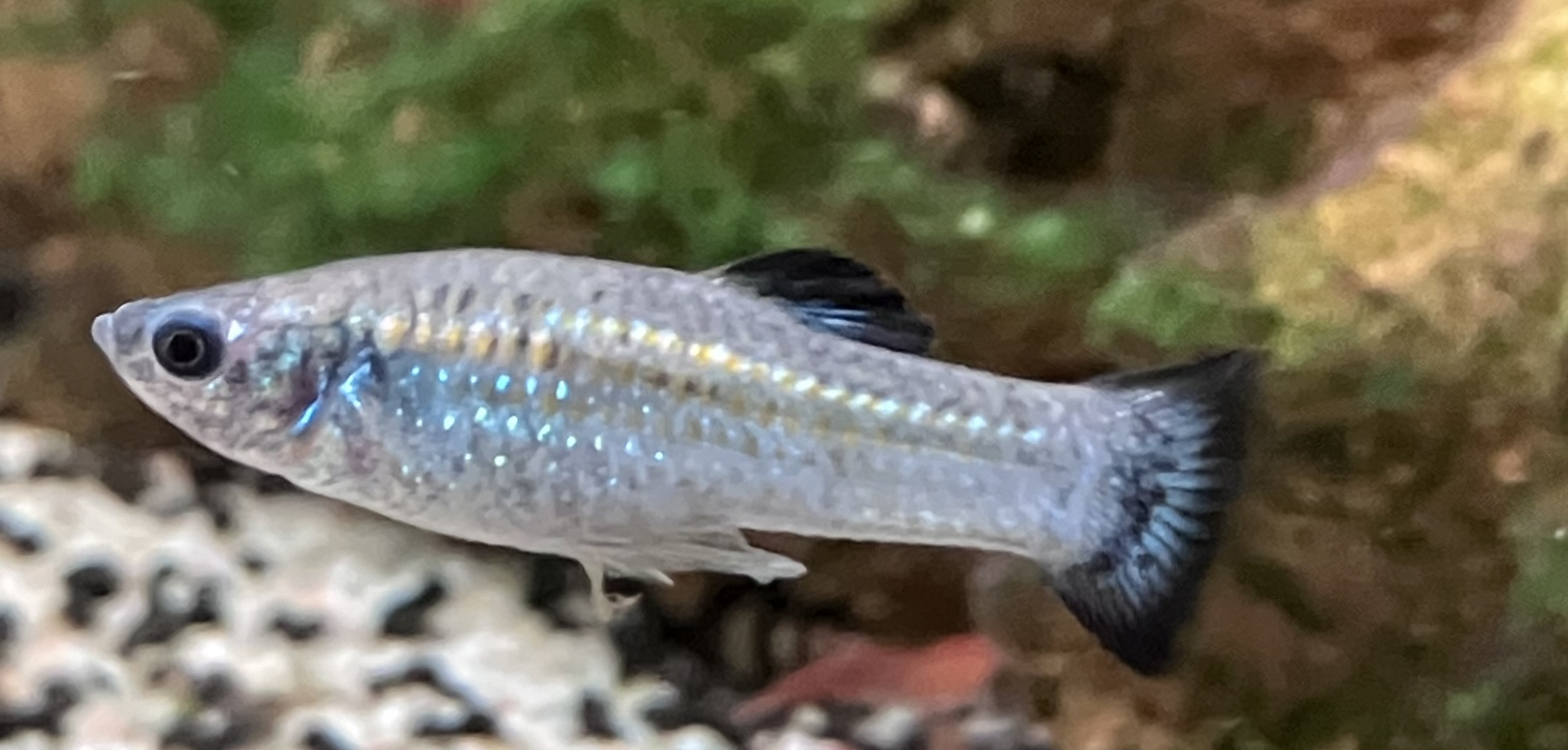
  Poecilia chica
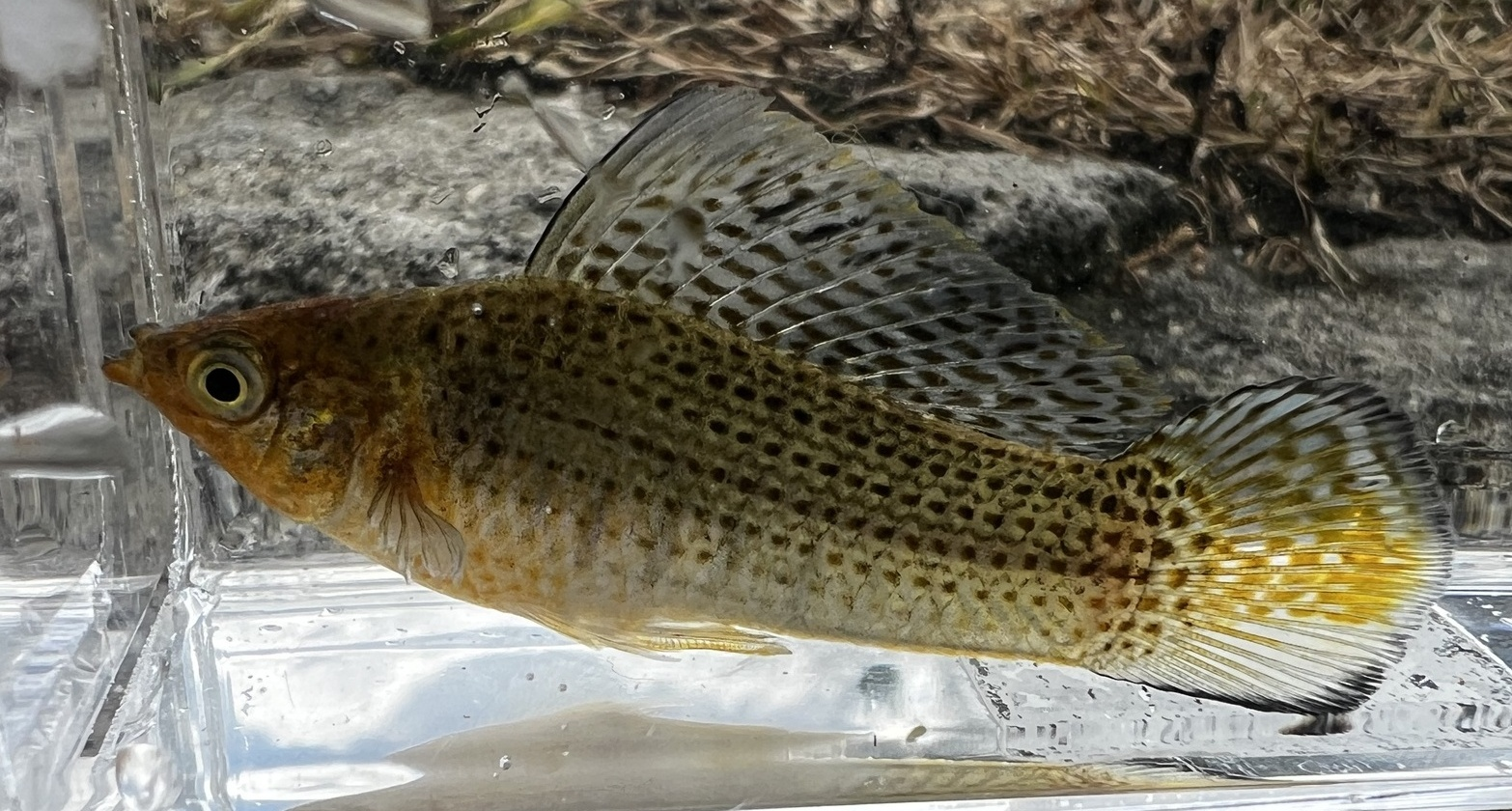
  Poecilia latipinna
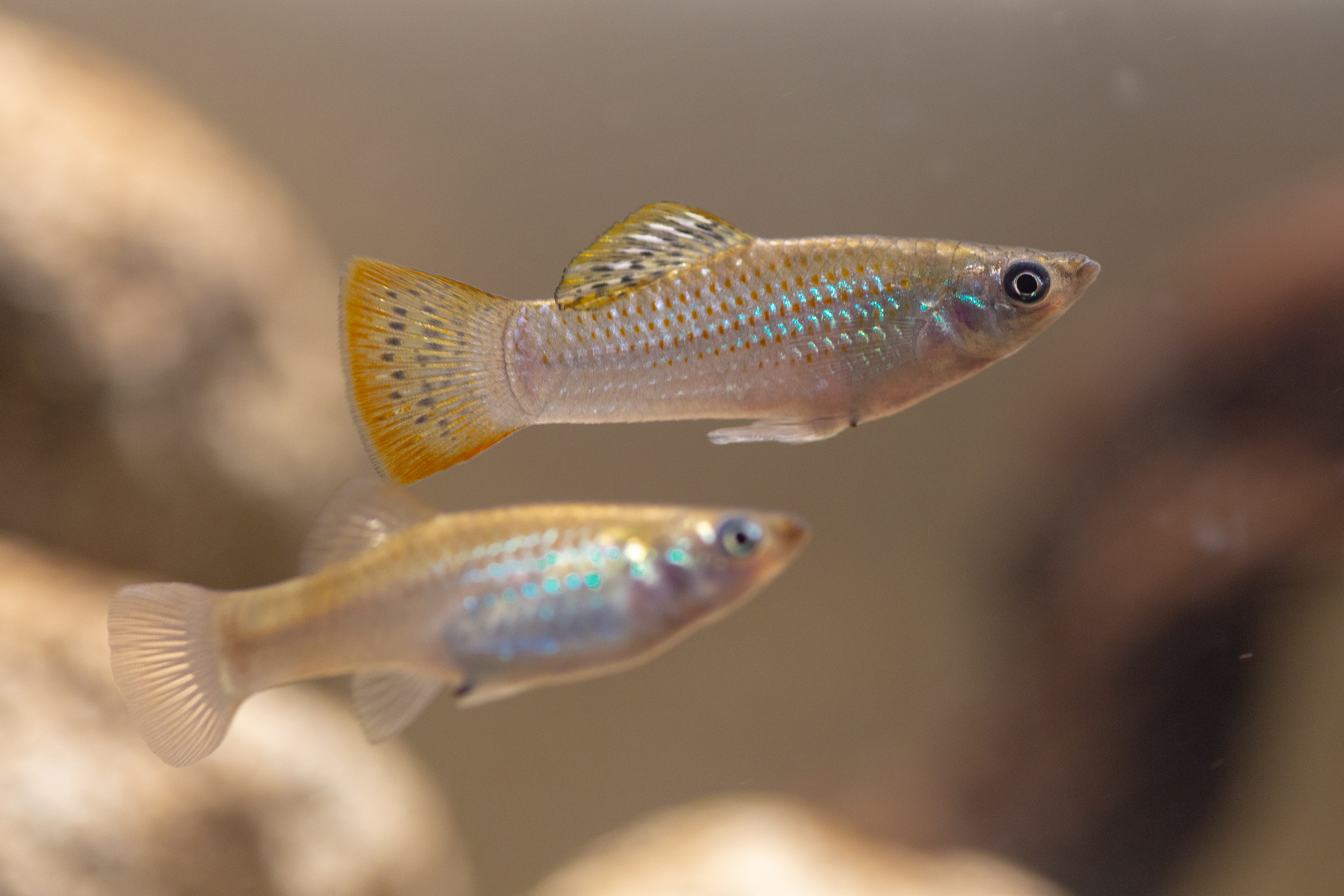
  Poecilia mexicana
- Poecilia branneri Eigenmann, 1894
- Poecilia butleri D. S. Jordan, 1889 (Pacific molly)
- Poecilia catemaconis R. R. Miller, 1975 (Catemaco molly)
- Poecilia caucana (Steindachner, 1880) (Cauca molly)
- Poecilia caymanensis (Rivas & Fink, 1970)
- Poecilia chica R. R. Miller, 1975 (dwarf molly)
- Poecilia dauli M. K. Meyer & Radda, 2000
- Poecilia dominicensis (Evermann & H. W. Clark, 1906)
- Poecilia elegans (Trewavas, 1948) (elegant molly)
- Poecilia formosa (Girard, 1859) (Amazon molly)
- Poecilia fuscomaculata (Rivas, 1980)
- Poecilia garnieri (Rivas, 1980)
- Poecilia gillii (Kner, 1863)
- Poecilia grossidens (Rivas, 1980)
- Poecilia hasemani (Henn, 1916)
- Poecilia heterandria (Regan, 1913)
- Poecilia hispaniolana Rivas, 1978 (Hispaniola molly)
- Poecilia hollandi (Henn, 1916)
- Poecilia hondurensis Poeser, 2011
- Poecilia immaculata (Rivas, 1980)
- Poecilia islai (Rodriguez-Silva & Weaver, 2020)
- Poecilia koperi Poeser, 2003
- Poecilia kykesis Poeser, 2002
- Poecilia latipinna (Lesueur, 1821) (sailfin molly)
- Poecilia latipunctata Meek, 1904 (broadspotted molly)
- Poecilia limantouri Jordan & Snyder, 1899
- Poecilia mandibularis (Rodriguez-Silva, Torres-Pineda & Josaphat, 2020)
- Poecilia marcellinoi Poeser, 1995
- Poecilia maylandi M. K. Meyer, 1983 (Balsas molly)
- Poecilia mechthildae M. K. Meyer, Etzel & Bork, 2002
- Poecilia melanogaster Günther, 1866
- Poecilia melanonotata (Nichols & Myers, 1923)
- Poecilia mexicana Steindachner, 1863 (shortfin molly)
- Poecilia minima Costa & Sarraf, 1997
- Poecilia minor (Garman, 1895)
- Poecilia miragoanensis (Rivas 1980)
- Poecilia montana Rosen & Bailey, 1963
- Poecilia nelsoni (Meek, 1904)
- Poecilia nigrofasciata (Regan, 1913)
- Poecilia obscura Schories, M. K. Meyer & Schartl, 2009
- Poecilia ornata (Regan, 1913)
- Poecilia orri Fowler, 1943 (mangrove molly)
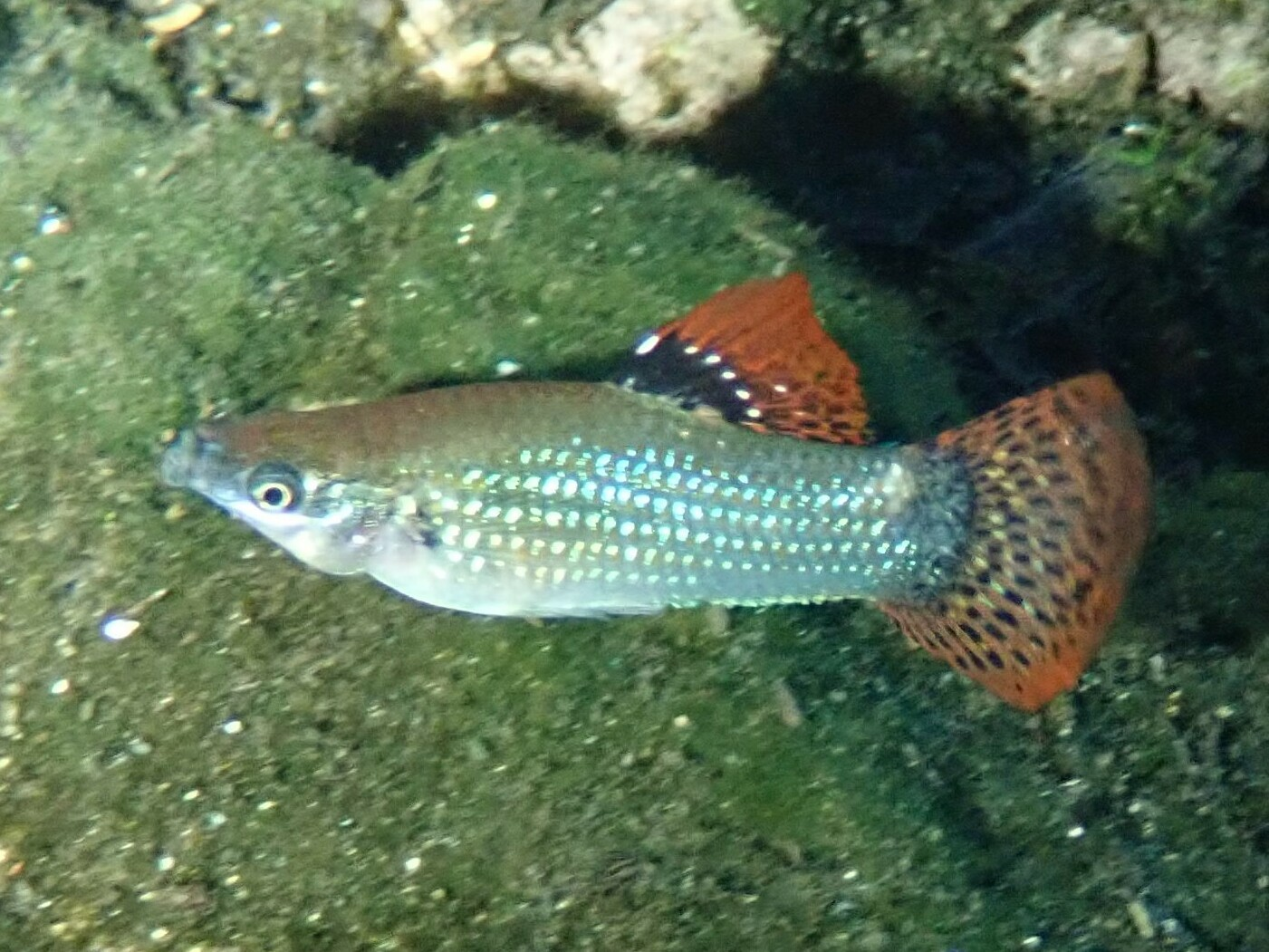
  Poecilia orri
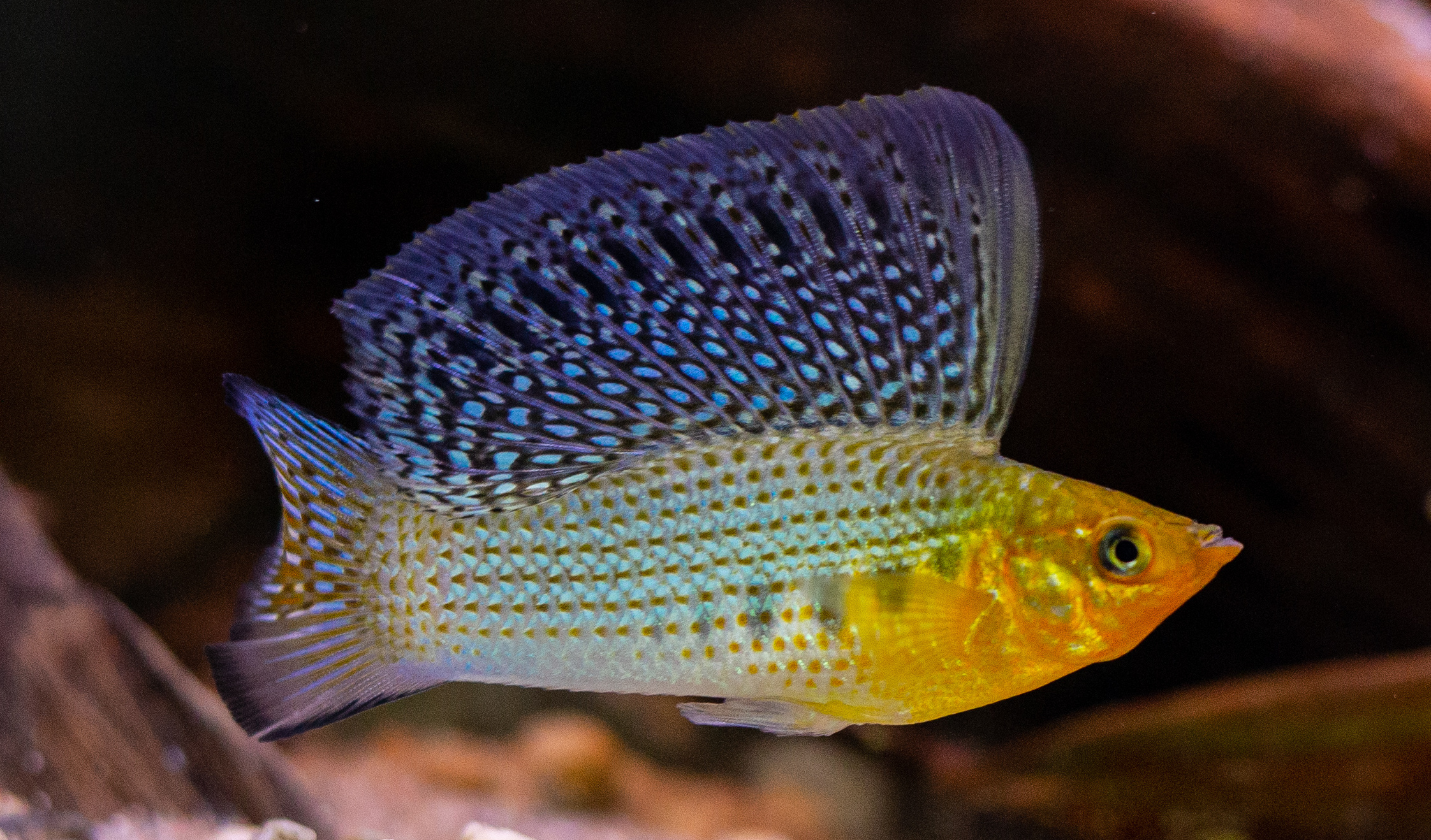
  Poecilia velifera
- Poecilia pallida (de Buen, 1943)
- Poecilia parae C. H. Eigenmann, 1894 (Melanzona guppy)
- Poecilia pauciradiata (Rivas, 1980)
- Poecilia pertapeh (Figueiredo, 2008)
- Poecilia perugiae (Evermann & Clark, 1906)
- Poecilia petenensis Günther, 1866 (Peten molly)
- Poecilia picta (Regan, 1913) (Swamp guppy)
- Poecilia reticulata W. K. H. Peters, 1859 (guppy)
- Poecilia rivasi (Franz & Burgess, 1983)
- Poecilia rositae M. K. Meyer, K. Schneider, Radda, B. Wilde & Schartl, 2004
- Poecilia salvatoris Regan, 1907 (Liberty molly)
- Poecilia sarrafae Bragança & W. J. E. M. Costa, 2011
- Poecilia scalpridens (Garman, 1895)
- Poecilia sphenops Valenciennes, 1846 (black molly)
- Poecilia sulphuraria (Álvarez, 1948) (sulphur molly)
- Poecilia sulphurophila (Rivas, 1980)
- Poecilia teresae D. W. Greenfield, 1990 (mountain molly)
- Poecilia thermalis Steindachner, 1863
- Poecilia tridens Hilgendorf, 1889
- Poecilia vandepolli van Lidth de Jeude, 1887
- Poecilia velifera (Regan, 1914) (Yucatán molly)
- Poecilia versicolor (Günther, 1866)
- Poecilia vittata Guichenot, 1843
- Poecilia vivipara Bloch & J. G. Schneider, 1801
- Poecilia waiapi Bragança, W. J. E. M. Costa & Gama, 2012
- Poecilia wandae Poeser, 2003
- Poecilia wingei Poeser, Kempkes & Isbrücker, 2005 (Endler's guppy, Endler's livebearer)
- Poecilia yaguajali (Rivas, 1980)
- Poecilia zonata (Nichols, 1915)

If Poecilia in the wider sense is used then the species would be divided up into subgenera as follows:

- Poecilia Bloch & Schneider 1801
  - Poecilia (Poecilia) vivipara
- Acanthophacelus Eigenmann 1907
  - Poecilia (Acanthophacelus) kempkesi
  - Poecilia (Acanthophacelus) obscura
  - Poecilia (Acanthophacelus) reticulata
  - Poecilia (Acanthophacelus) wingei
- Allopoecilia Hubbs 1924
  - Poecilia (Allopoecilia) caucana
  - Poecilia (Allopoecilia) dauli
- Curtipenis Rivas & Myers 1950
  - Poecilia (Curtipenis) elegans
- Limia Poey 1854
  - Poecilia (Limia) caudofasciata
  - Poecilia (Limia) caymanensi
  - Poecilia (Limia) dominicensis
  - Poecilia (Limia) fuscomaculata
  - Poecilia (Limia) garnieri
  - Poecilia (Limia) grossidens
  - Poecilia (Limia) immaculata
  - Poecilia (Limia) melanogaster
  - Poecilia (Limia) melanonotata
  - Poecilia (Limia) miragoanensis
  - Poecilia (Limia) nicholsi
  - Poecilia (Limia) nigrofasciata
  - Poecilia (Limia) ornata
  - Poecilia (Limia) pauciradiata
  - Poecilia (Limia) perugiae
  - Poecilia (Limia) rivasi
  - Poecilia (Limia) sulphurophila
  - Poecilia (Limia) tridens
  - Poecilia (Limia) versicolor
  - Poecilia (Limia) vittata
  - Poecilia (Limia) yaguajali
  - Poecilia (Limia) zonata
- Micropoecilia Hubbs 1926
  - Poecilia (Micropoecilia) bifurca
  - Poecilia (Micropoecilia) branneri
  - Poecilia (Micropoecilia) minima
  - Poecilia (Micropoecilia) parae
  - Poecilia (Micropoecilia) picta
  - Poecilia (Micropoecilia) sarrafae
  - Poecilia (Micropoecilia) waiapi
- Mollienesia Lesueur 1821
  - Poecilia (Mollienesia) boesemani
  - Poecilia (Mollienesia) butleri
  - Poecilia (Mollienesia) catemaconis
  - Poecilia (Mollienesia) chica
  - Poecilia (Mollienesia) formosa
  - Poecilia (Mollienesia) gillii
  - Poecilia (Mollienesia) hondurensis
  - Poecilia (Mollienesia) koperi
  - Poecilia (Mollienesia) kykesis
  - Poecilia (Mollienesia) latipinna
  - Poecilia (Mollienesia) latipunctata
  - Poecilia (Mollienesia) limantouri
  - Poecilia (Mollienesia) marcellinoi
  - Poecilia (Mollienesia) maylandi
  - Poecilia (Mollienesia) mechthildae
  - Poecilia (Mollienesia) mexicana
  - Poecilia (Mollienesia) nelsoni
  - Poecilia (Mollienesia) orri
  - Poecilia (Mollienesia) petenensis
  - Poecilia (Mollienesia) rositae
  - Poecilia (Mollienesia) salvatoris
  - Poecilia (Mollienesia) sphenops
  - Poecilia (Mollienesia) sulphuraria
  - Poecilia (Mollienesia) teresae
  - Poecilia (Mollienesia) thermalis
  - Poecilia (Mollienesia) vandepolli
  - Poecilia (Mollienesia) velifera
  - Poecilia (Mollienesia) wandae
- Pseudolimia Poeser 2002
  - Poecilia (Pseudolimia) heterandria
- Psychropoecilia Myers 1935
  - Poecilia (Psychropoecilia) hispaniolana
  - Poecilia (Psychropoecilia) montana

== Gallery ==
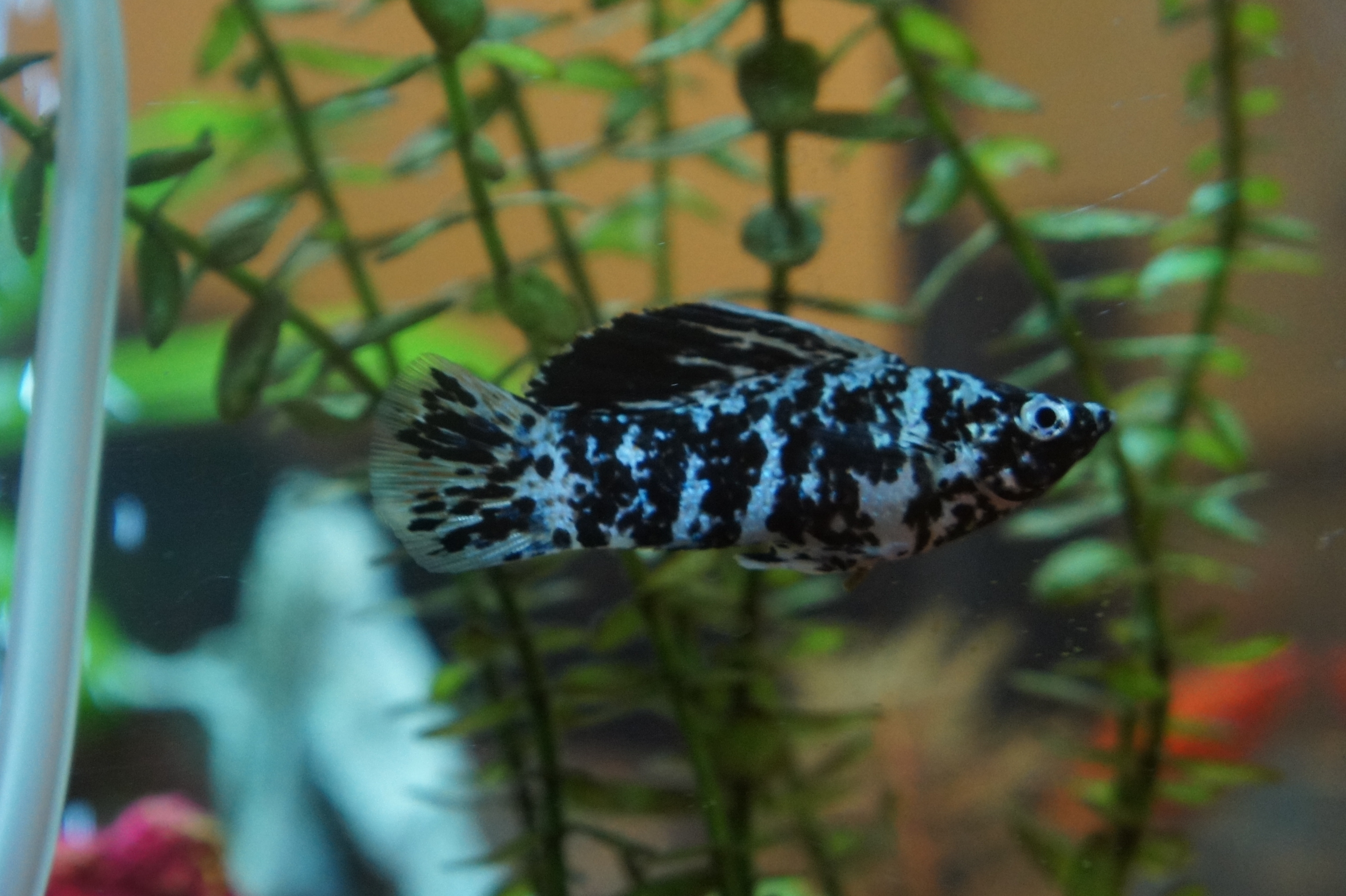
A male Dalmatian molly in a community aquarium

A male black molly

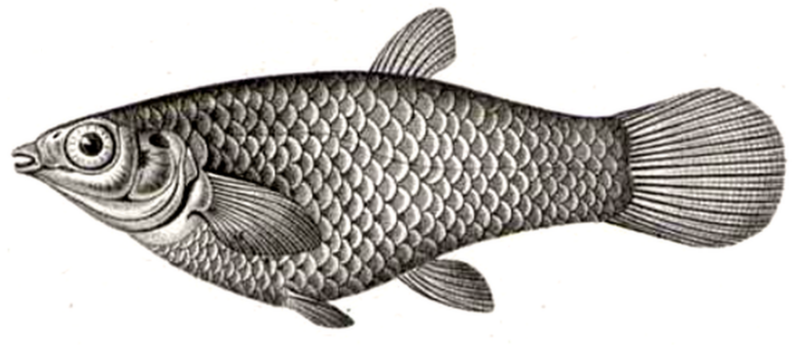
Poecilia vivipara

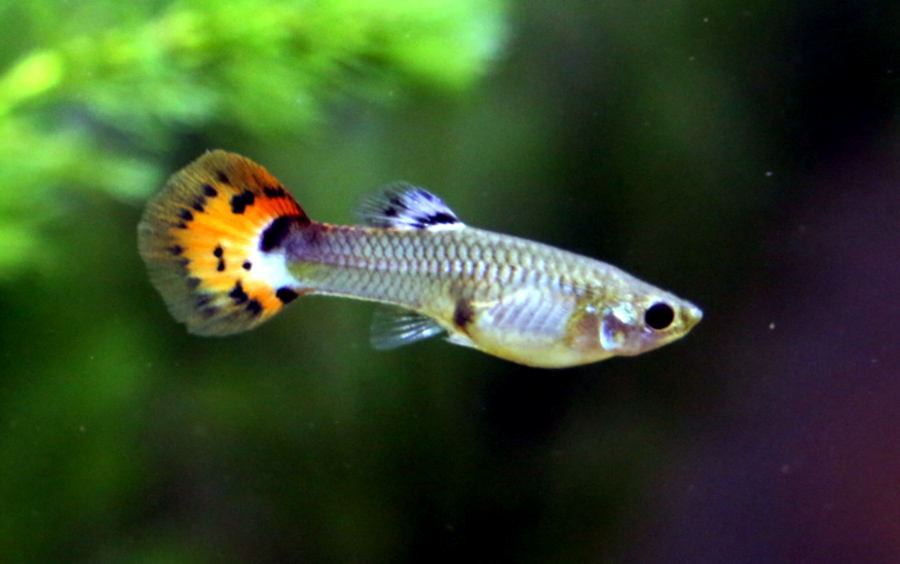
A female guppy (Poecilia reticulata)

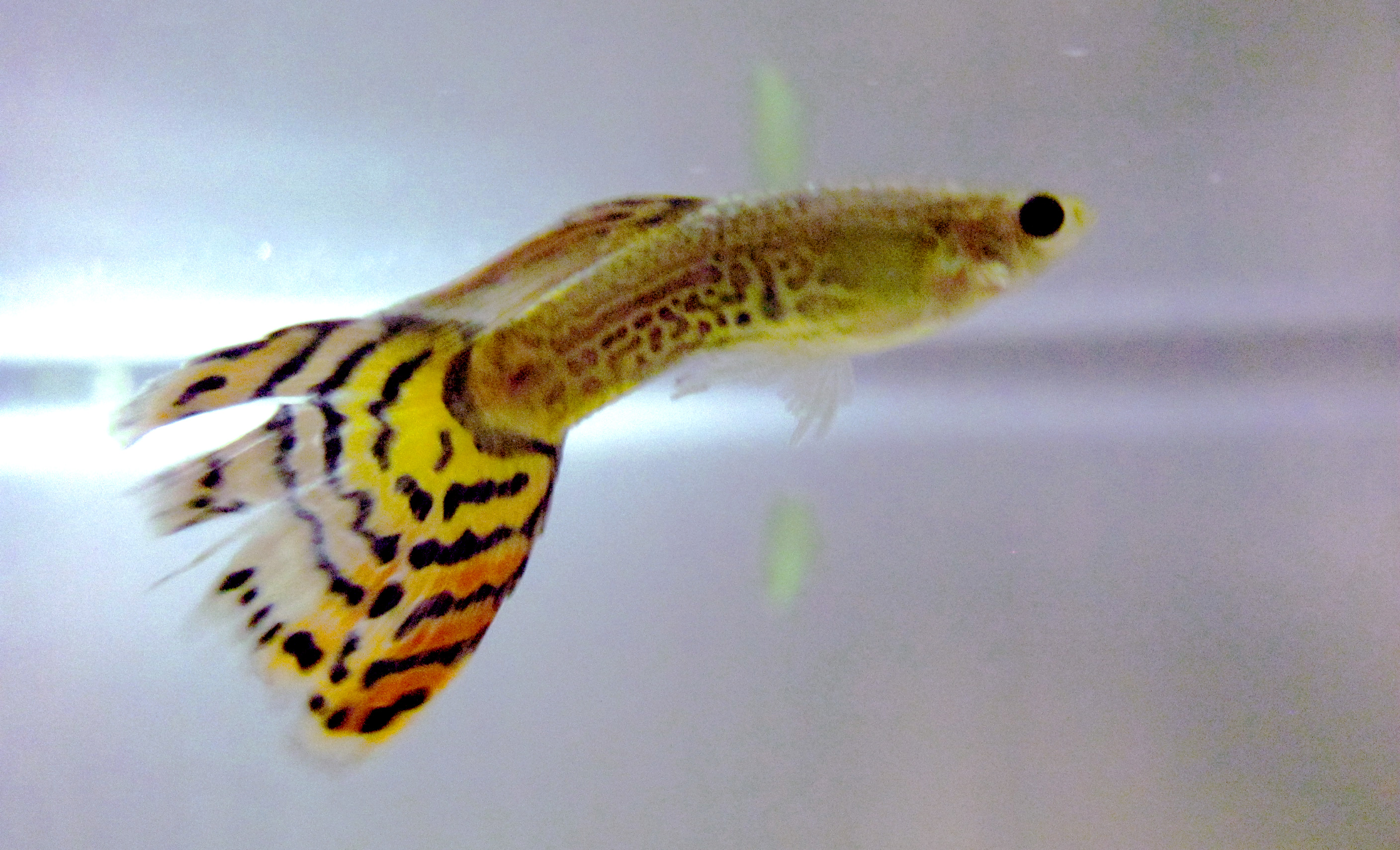
A male guppy
