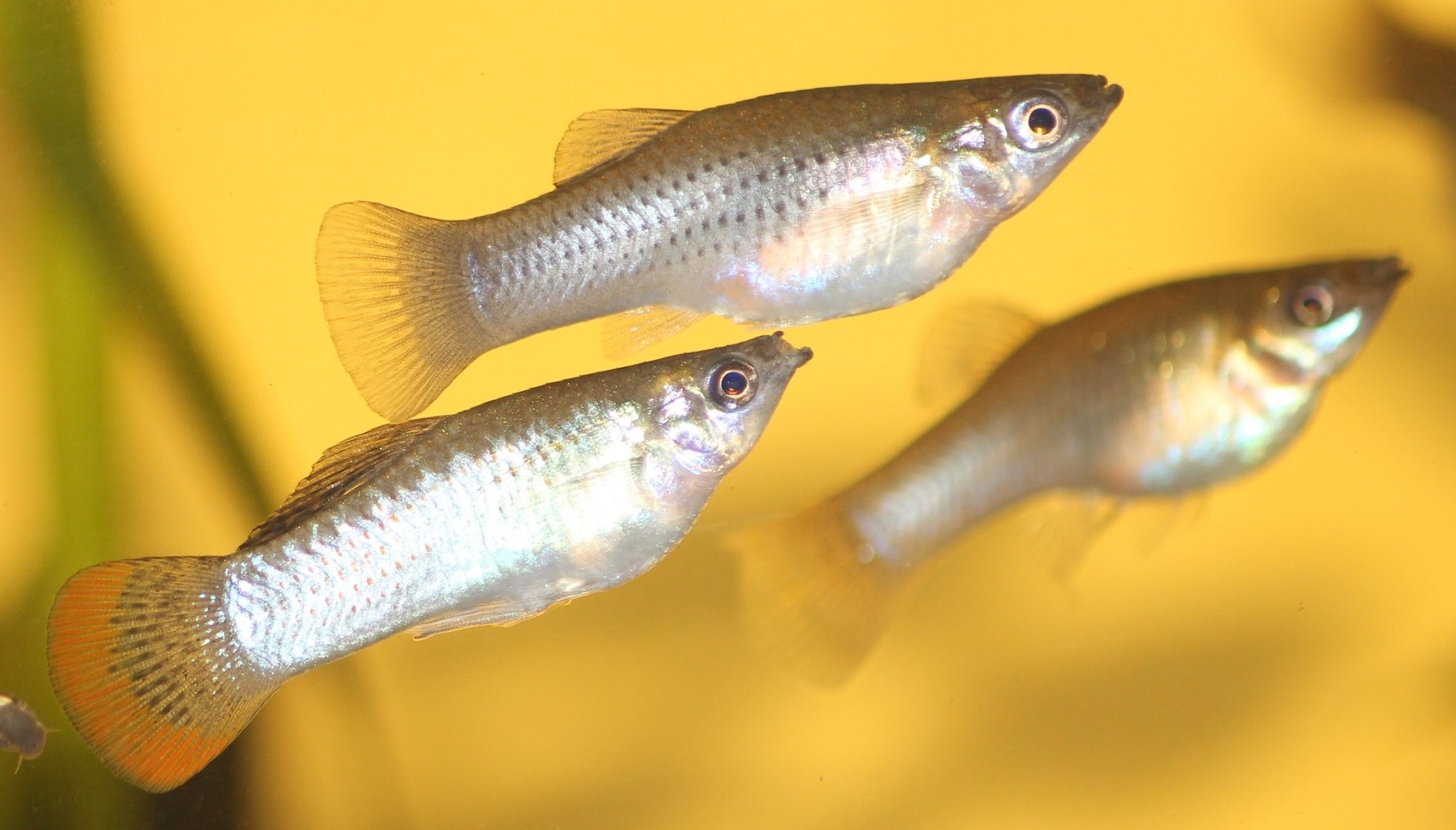
- A male (bottom left) with females

Conservation status
- Least Concern (IUCN 3.1)

Scientific classification
- Kingdom: Animalia
- Phylum: Chordata
- Class: Actinopterygii
- Order: Cyprinodontiformes
- Family: Poeciliidae
- Genus: Poecilia
- Species: P. butleri

Binomial name
- Poecilia butleri Jordan, 1889

= Poecilia butleri =

Pacific molly

Species of fish

Poecilia butleri, the Pacific molly, is a species of poeciliid fish native to the estuaries, lagoons, bays, and slow flowing fresh waters of the Pacific slope of Mexico and El Salvador. It belongs to the shortfin molly species complex. Pacific mollies feed mainly on cyanobacteria and detritus.

== Taxonomy and description ==
Poecilia butleri was originally described in 1889 by Jordan, who named it after his friend, the naturalist Amos Butler. Rosen and Bailey reduced it to a synonym of P. sphenops. Schultz and Miller disagreed and in 1971 restored P. butleri to species rank on the grounds of partial reproductive and geographic isolation. P. butleri belongs to the Mollienesia subgenus and P. sphenops (shortfin molly) species complex. The two species often occur together in nature. They easily hybridize in the laboratory to produce fertile offspring, but only one such hybrid has been recorded in the drainage of the Papagayo River, where the two mollies live together. This paucity points to reproductive barriers that have not yet been identified.

Young Pacific mollies have faint dark bars, while adults are uniformly olive in color. The fish inhabiting the Papagayo River drainage have four or five rows of orange spots on their flanks. The caudal fin features few black spots, but they are numerous in the dorsal fin of both sexes. The largest known specimen reached 93 mm in standard length.

== Distribution and habitat ==
P. butleri occurs along the Pacific drainage of Mexico and El Salvador, from the Fuerte River basin in Sonora southward to the mouth of the Comasagua River west of La Libertad, El Salvador; its true southern limit remains uncertain and it likely extends farther west in El Salvador. While it occurs in freshwater in northwestern Mexico, east of the Río Balsas it is primarily found in brackish and marine coastal habitats, and it is expected to inhabit many coastal lagoons of El Salvador. The species is abundant across much of its range. Its range extends further north than that of P. sphenops. In the part of the range it shares with P. sphenops, P. butleri inhabits slower-flowing streams and is therefore more common near the coast. P. butleri and, on the Atlantic slope, P. mexicana, are the only shortfin molly species found in brackish lagoons and river mouths.

Poecilia butleri is common in the upper reaches of the Ameca and Coahuayana rivers in Jalisco, where those populations appear to be introduced. Its ovoviparity and preference for estuarine and freshwater habitats may facilitate its spread into Baja California, where it appears to have been accidentally introduced from Sinaloa in 1995 via containers for breeding Pacific white shrimp. The establishment of mollies in this area might affect native mullets, snappers, grunts, and snooks, which rely on salt marsh habitats for reproduction.

Poecilia butleri occupies a wide range of coastal and inland shallow waters, including low-gradient streams, slow stretches of larger rivers, lagoons, estuaries, ocean bays and coastal pools, tolerating fresh to fully saline conditions. Water clarity ranges from clear to turbid or muddy, currents from still to moderate, and depths generally do not exceed 1 m. Substrates recorded include sand, silt, mud, gravel, rock and boulder, and the species occurs among diverse vegetation types—filamentous algae, Chara, Potamogeton, Eichhornia, Pistia, Typha, Juncus, Nasturtium, Salvinia—as well as in mangrove stands. In the Papagayo River drainage, the Pacific molly occurs together with the characin Astyanax fasciatus, a Cichlasoma cichlid, and the goby Sicydium multipunctatum in slowly flowing waters over green algae-covered rocks and boulders; P. sphenops is also present in small numbers, apparently invading from the upper reaches.

== Ecology ==
Poecilia butleri is herbivorous and detrivorous; a gut analysis of specimens from the Quelite River and a mangrove swamp near Tecoman showed that the fish had fed exclusively on cyanobacteria. It might also take dipterous larvae. Its predators include the boat-billed heron. The species may carry parasites such as trematodes, cestodes, and nematodes.

Poecilia butleri reaches sexual maturity at five or six months. After a gestation of 28 days, the female gives birth to 20 to 60 young. Reproductive season appears to be extended: juveniles 7.0–11 mm standard length have been collected from February through late July.
