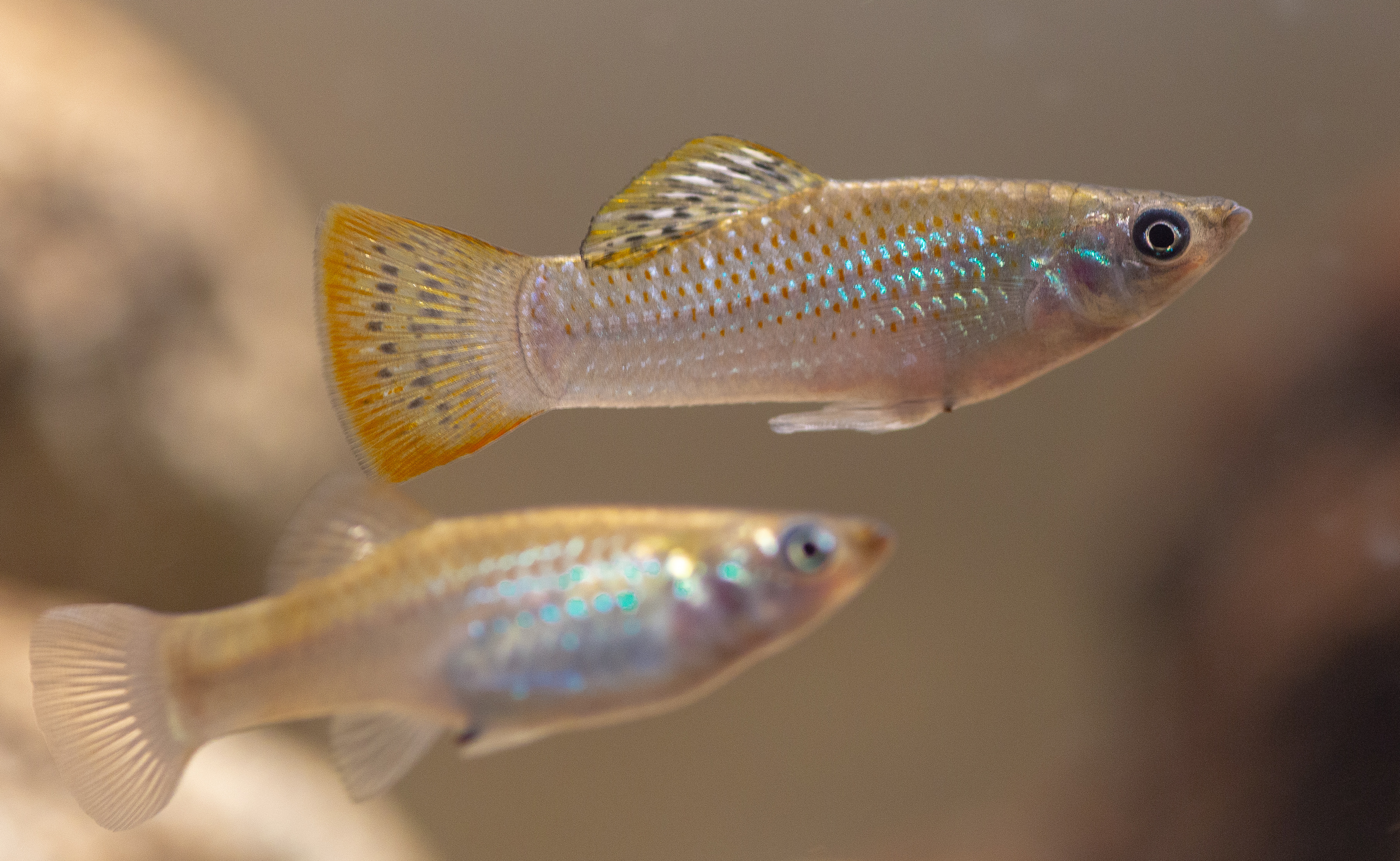
- A male (top) and a female (bottom)

Conservation status
- Least Concern (IUCN 3.1)

Scientific classification
- Kingdom: Animalia
- Phylum: Chordata
- Class: Actinopterygii
- Division: Teleostei
- Order: Cyprinodontiformes
- Family: Poeciliidae
- Genus: Poecilia
- Species: P. mexicana

Binomial name
- Poecilia mexicana Steindachner, 1863

Synonyms
- Poecilia cuneata Garman, 1895; Poecilia limantouri Jordan & Snyder, 1899

= Poecilia mexicana =

Species of fish

Poecilia mexicana, commonly known as the Atlantic molly, is a species of poeciliid fish native to the Atlantic slope of Middle America. The species is highly variable in coloration, shape, and size. Atlantic mollies occur in fresh and brackish waters, shallow and slow-flowing or standing. They feed chiefly on algae and detritus. Two populations are found in caves and represent some of the best-studied cavefish. It hybridizes with other Poecilia species in its range; one such cross has resulted in the unisexual P. formosa.

== Taxonomy ==
Poecilia mexicana was described in 1863 by Steindachner. Rosen and Bailey reduced P. mexicana and other shortfin mollies to synonyms of P. sphenops, a similar species which occurs throughout much of the range of P. mexicana. In 1971, Schultz and Miller restored P. butleri to species rank on the grounds of partial reproductive and geographic isolation. Two years later, Menzel and Darnell resurrected P. mexicana from synonymy of P. sphenops, noting that it differs from P. sphenops in ways similar to P. butleri. The key difference is dental: P. butleri and P. mexicana have inner jaw teeth with a single point (unicuspid), whereas P. sphenops has inner jaw teeth with three points (tricuspid). Menzel and Darnell recognized a subspecies, P. mexicana limantouri.

== Description ==
Poecilia mexicana is a slim, laterally flattened molly with a wide array of forms. The maximum known standard length (SL) is 95 mm. Mature males occur in multiple size classes, ranging from 18 mm to more than 70 mm. The head is flat on top and triangular in side view, narrowing to a pointed snout. The mouth opens at the front, is straight, and can be pushed forward. Both jaws carry narrow bands of teeth; the outer teeth are long, fine, and curved backward, forming a brush-like edge. Eyes are large, about one third of head length, and set high on the head.

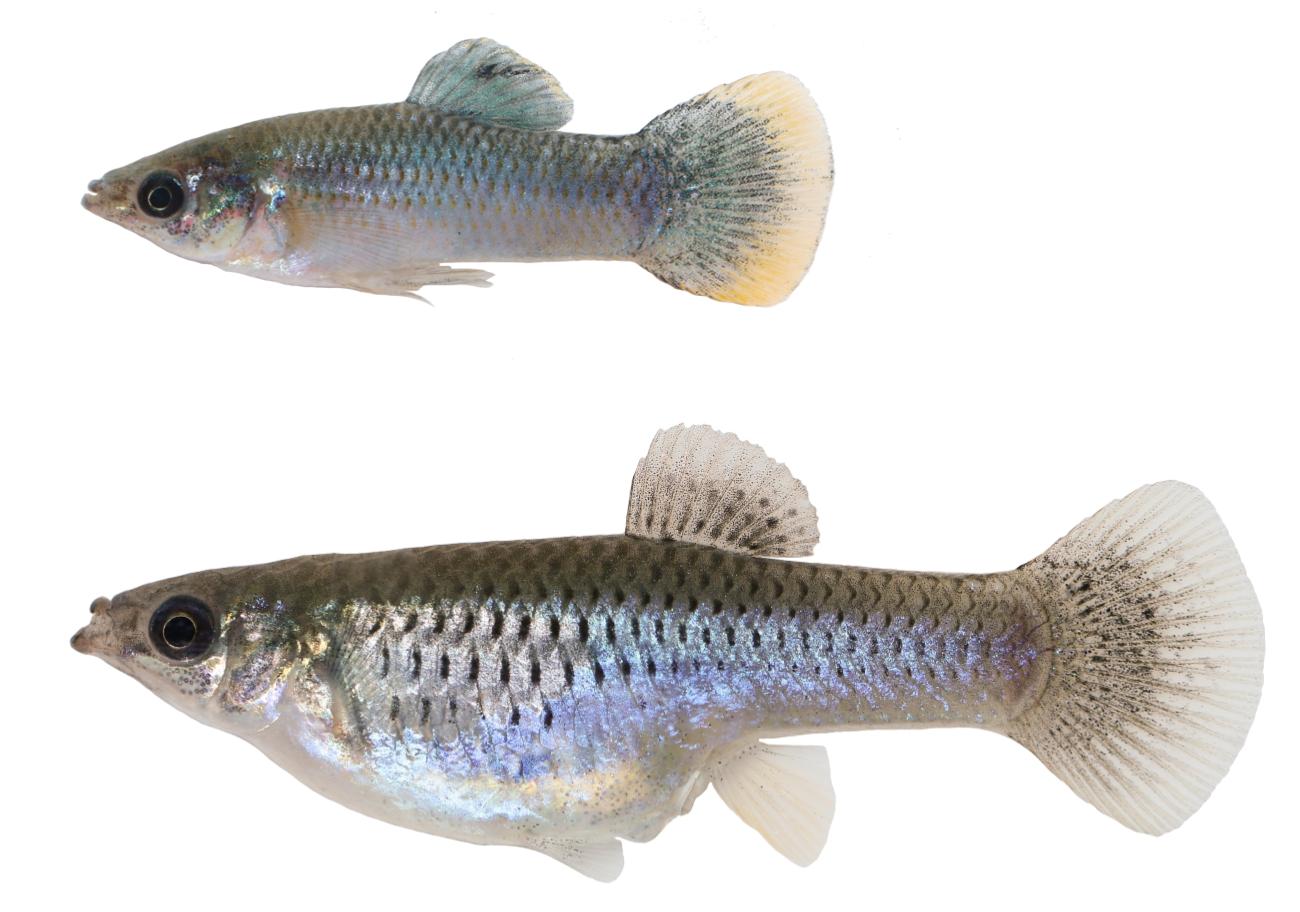
In Atlantic mollies, females are larger and curvier than males.

There are clear differences between the sexes. Males are more slender, while females are deeper-bodied. Females have a broader back and a strongly rounded belly, whereas males are less curved. The tail base is relatively deep, especially in females. The dorsal fin begins slightly before the middle of the body and is rounded. Pectoral fins are large and nearly as long as the head; pelvic fins are shorter. The anal fin is tall and somewhat pointed, and the tail fin is broadly rounded and slightly longer than the head, with scales covering much of its base.

Scales are fairly large and cover most of the head except the jaws. Along the side of the body there are about 28 scales, with 10–11 between the dorsal and pelvic fins and about eight around the tail base. Most scales show a small central pore linked to the lateral line sensory system. The upper body is brown, gradually changing to golden yellow below. Each scale is darker at the base and along its rear edge. Dark spots on the sides vary: many males lack them, but some individuals show a row of spots, while females may have several rows running lengthwise along the body. The dorsal fin always has several rows of dark spots; the pelvic and anal fins are golden yellow, and the pectoral fins are dull yellow to brownish.

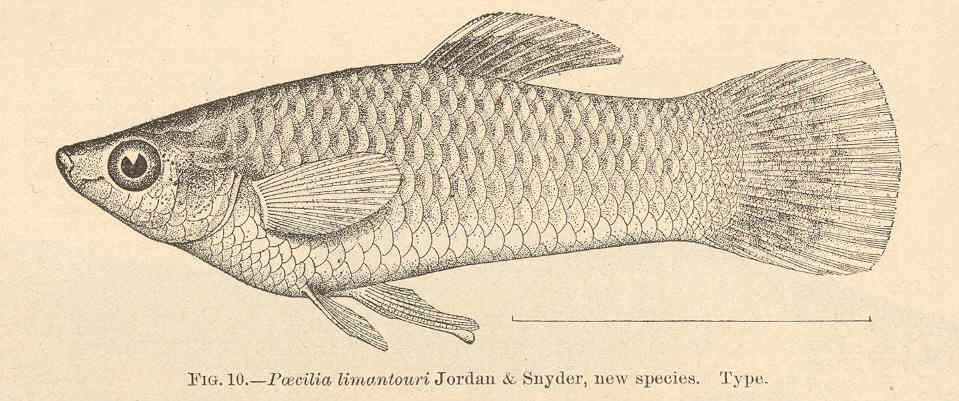
P. mexicana limantouri is a slender subspecies of the Atlantic molly.

The two subspecies differ mainly in overall body form and fin proportions. P. m. limantouri has a more slender, almost cylindrical body, with a relatively short dorsal fin and a narrow caudal fin. In contrast, P. m. mexicana is deeper-bodied and somewhat laterally compressed, with a noticeably longer dorsal fin and a broader caudal fin. In areas where their ranges meet, individuals often show intermediate features.

== Distribution and habitat ==
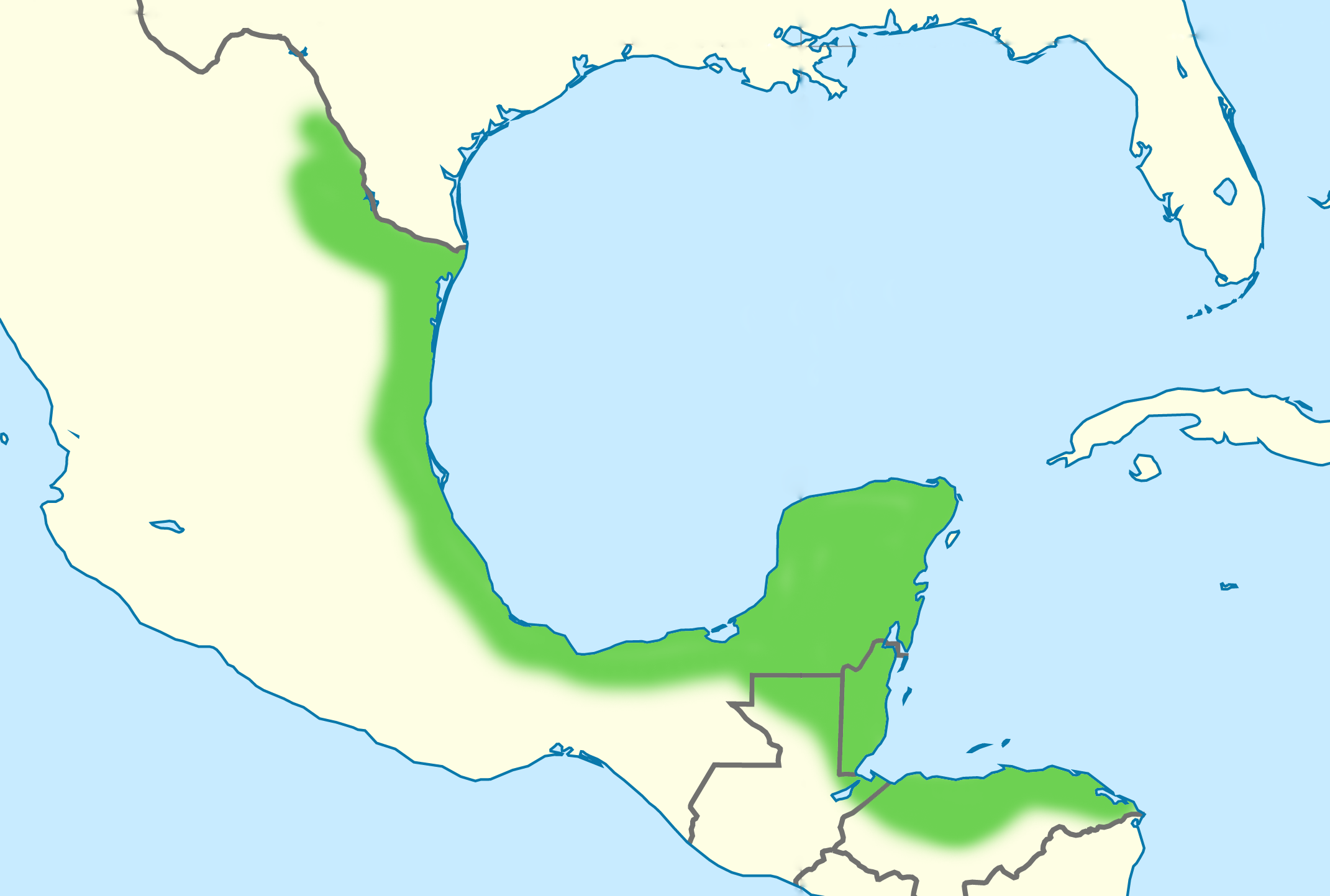
Poecilia mexicana occupies the Atlantic slope of Middle America.

Poecilia mexicana occupies much of the Atlantic slope of Middle America, extending from the lower basin of the Río Bravo (including the Álamo and San Juan rivers) south through Central America to Costa Rica, where it reaches the Río Matina. Offshore populations occur on the Bay Islands of Honduras. Within Mexico it has been recorded from Campeche, Chiapas, Hidalgo, Nuevo León, Oaxaca, Puebla, Querétaro, Quintana Roo, San Luis Potosí, Tabasco, Tamaulipas, Veracruz, and Yucatán. On the Pacific slope it is known only from the upper Río Choluteca basin in Honduras. The type locality was given as Orizaba, but the specimens almost certainly came from farther east, probably the Río Blanco or one of its tributaries. The species has also been introduced into the Río Lerma basin on the Pacific slope of Mexico.

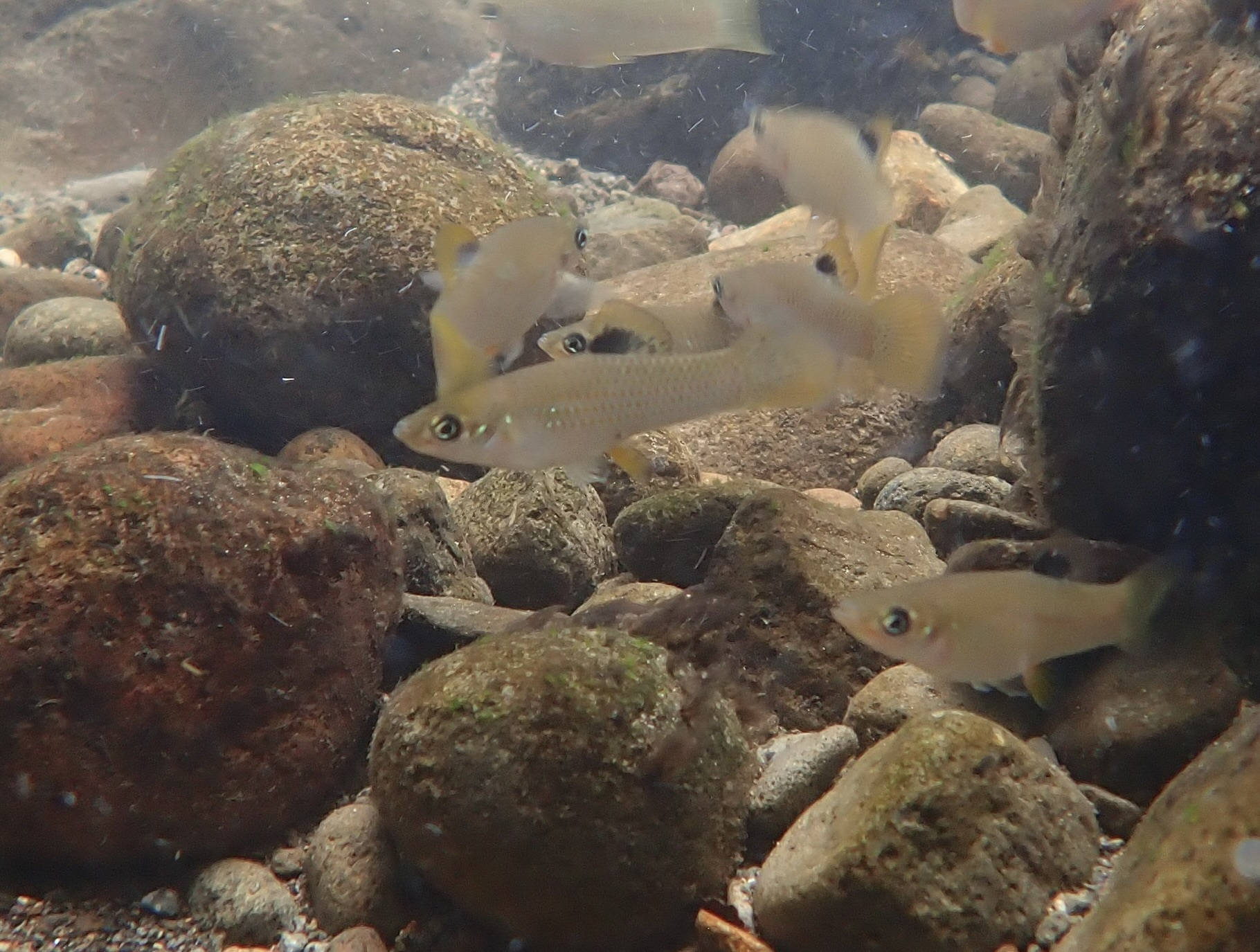
Atlantic mollies occur over a variety of substrates, including rocks.

Poecilia mexicana inhabits a wide range of lowland aquatic environments, including coastal lagoons, estuaries, ponds, and rivers, and in Mexico it also penetrates upland streams to at least 600 m elevation. The species tolerates fresh, brackish, and saltwater, having been recorded at salinities up to 32.4 ppt. It typically occurs in shallow water, often less than 1 m deep, occupying pools, riffles, or still habitats with little or no current. Substrates vary widely and include rock, mud, silt, sand, and rubble, though the fish is especially common over rocky bottoms coated with dense films of filamentous algae, diatoms, protozoans, and decomposing plant material. During the rainy season, dense aggregations often disperse into temporary waters such as roadside ditches, sometimes several kilometers from permanent habitats. Water clarity ranges from clear to highly turbid, and vegetation may be dense, particularly in oxbows of lowland rivers. Its broad ecological tolerance makes it a common fish along the Atlantic slope.

Poecilia mexicana limantouri occupies the northern part of the species' Gulf Coast distribution, extending from the Rio Grande drainage in Nuevo León south to the lower Río Tamesí near Tampico. P. m. mexicana occurs farther south, from the Río Cazones drainage to at least the Río Jamapa system south of the port of Veracruz. A wide zone of intergradation lies between these regions, running along the coast from the lower Río Soto la Marina in Tamaulipas to the Río Tuxpan in northern Veracruz and extending inland into nearby drainage basins.

== Behaviour and ecology ==
The Atlantic molly is primarily benthic, feeding on material scraped from exposed surfaces. Stomach contents consist largely of filamentous algae, diatoms, fragments of vascular plants, detritus, and other decaying organic matter. Feeding is accomplished by brushing or rasping surfaces with the lower lip and tooth row.

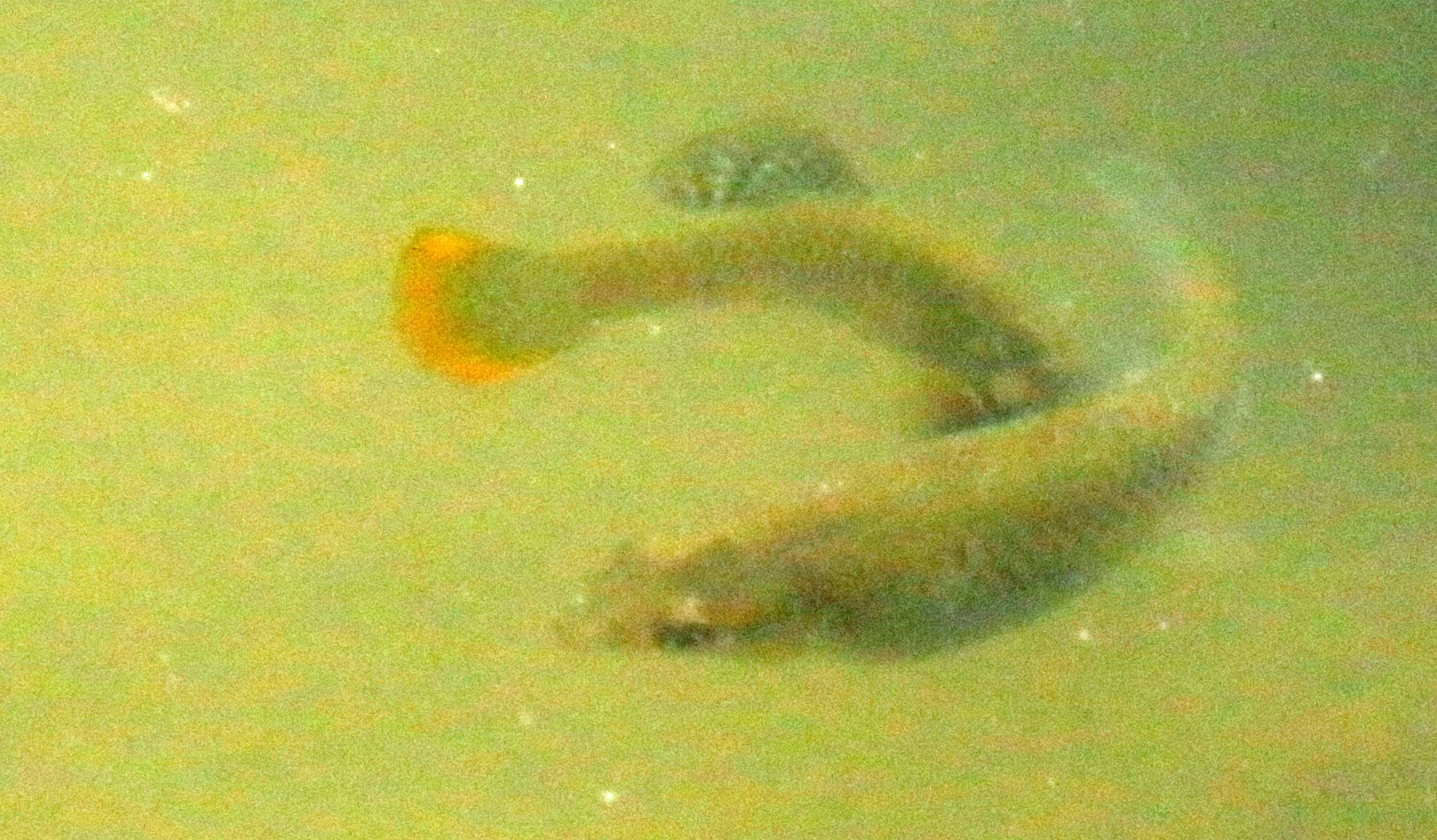
Atlantic molly males force copulation rather than court females.

Males do not grow significantly after reaching maturity and thus do not move between size classes. Large males defend females from other males, but neither large nor small males exhibit courtship display. Small males, which are almost always more numerous in nature, hide near groups of females and ambush them, forcing copulation. Females avoid parasitised males. Reproduction is prolonged through the year: collections containing juveniles 8.0–13 mm SL from December through August indicnear-continuous breeding, likely producing young monthly. Brood sizes recorded from adult females range from 13 to 35, though very large individuals may carry over 100 embryos.

A cross between the female of Poecilia mexicana and the male of P. latipinna gave rise to the all-female species P. formosa. P. formosa needs to mate with the males of other poeciliids to trigger its reproduction, but the offspring are clones of the mother. P. mexicana and P. latipinna are its preferred sperm donors. The species is also known to produce natural hybrids with P. latipunctata, P. petenensis, P. sphenops, and P. velifera, though such hybrids are rare.

== Cave mollies ==
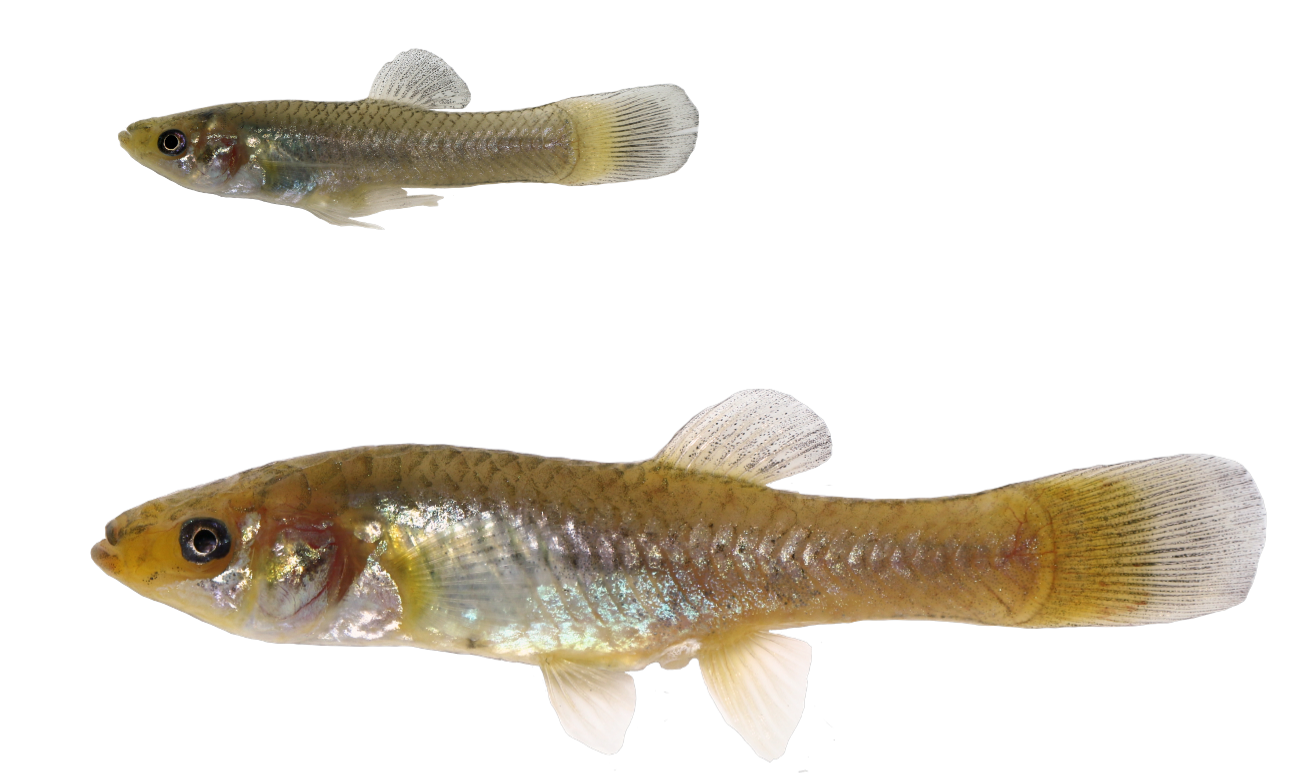
Cave mollies display a number of adaptations to living in a dark, toxic environment.

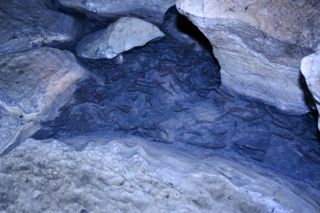
Despite complete darkness and water toxicity, molly populations in Azufre Cave are very dense.

Two cavernicolous populations of Poecilia mexicana are known, one found in Azufre Cave, the other in the nearby Luna Azufre Cave. Much of the system lies in total darkness, with only the entrance chambers faintly lit by openings in the ceiling, and the water is both oxygen-poor and rich in hydrogen sulfide, which is lethal to most animals even in the slightest amounts. Cave mollies regularly skim the water surface to take advantage of the thin, oxygen-rich layer.

Cave mollies are among the best-known cave-dwelling fish. They are paler than their surface-dwelling conspecifics and have reduced but still functional eyes and more taste buds on their heads. They exhibit less aggression and shoaling behavior, and males neither monopolize nor harass females. In contrast to the surface-dwelling mollies, cave molly females have a conspicuous genital pad; it presumably secretes chemical cues that attract males, which make use of their heightened sense of taste and nip it before mating. Cave mollies' traits change gradually from the cave entrance to its deepest sections in a genetically determined pattern, most likely caused by continued gene flow from surface fish into the inner cave population.

Although the caves are enriched by bat guano, cave mollies seem to be malnourished. They feed on invertebrates and algae resembling Beggiatoa. Population density is exceptionally high, with up to 100-200 fish per square meter, yet no food competition has been recorded. Cave mollies are heavily preyed upon by Belostoma water bugs, which stalk them perched on stones; once it catches a molly, the water bug pierces it with its rostrum and sucks up its internal liquids. Mollies do not avoid the shallow areas where the bugs wait for them, possibly because that is where they feed on bat guano.
