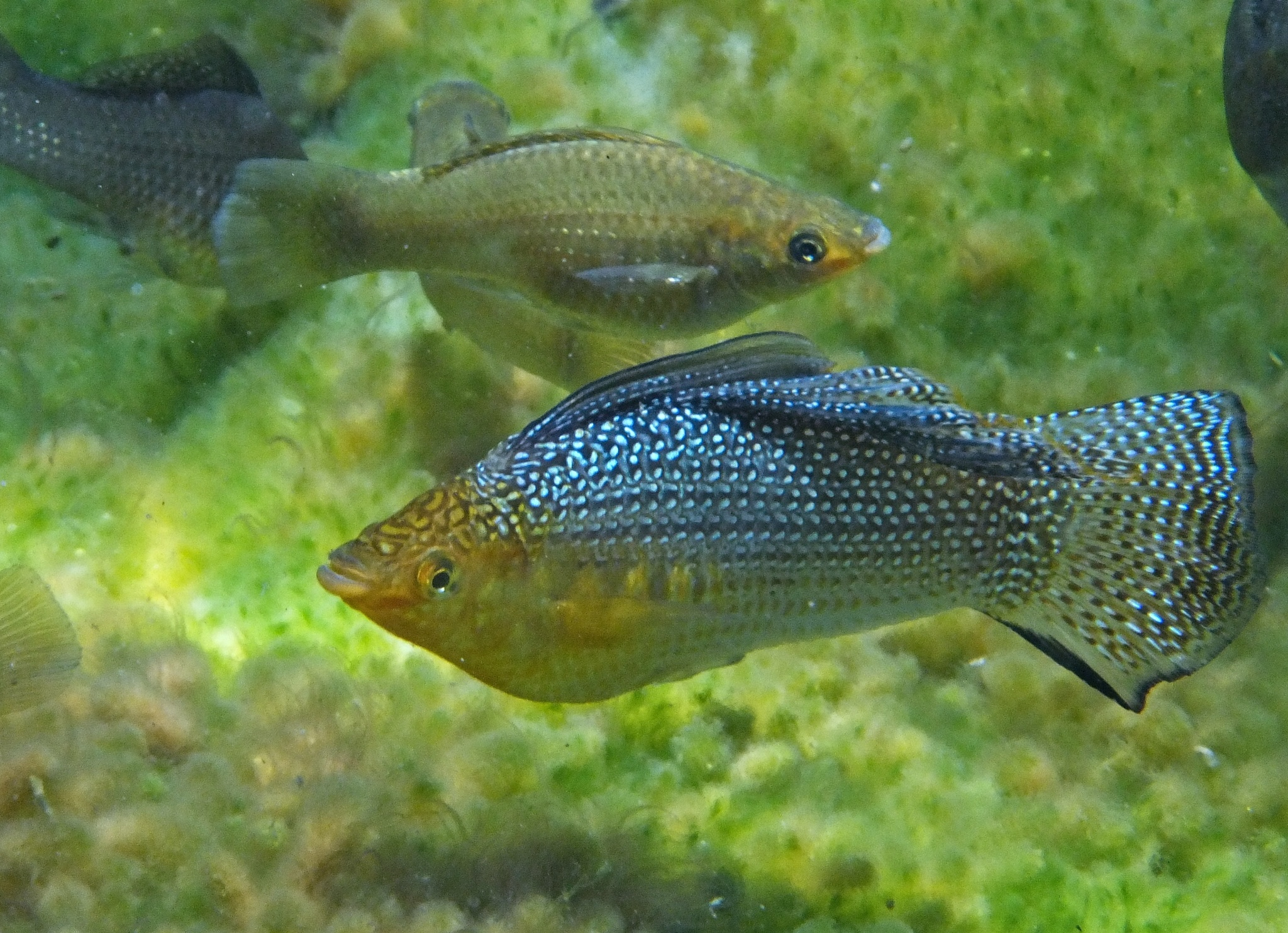
- A male (bottom) with females (top)

Conservation status
- Vulnerable (IUCN 3.1)

Scientific classification
- Kingdom: Animalia
- Phylum: Chordata
- Class: Actinopterygii
- Division: Teleostei
- Order: Cyprinodontiformes
- Family: Poeciliidae
- Genus: Poecilia
- Species: P. velifera

Binomial name
- Poecilia velifera (Regan, 1914)

Synonyms
- Mollienesia velifera Regan, 1914

= Poecilia velifera =

Yucatan molly

Species of fish

Poecilia velifera, commonly known as the Yucatán molly or giant sailfin molly, is a poeciliid fish native to the Yucatán Peninsula in Mexico. It is typically under 10 cm (3.9 in) in length but may reach 15 cm (5.9 in), males being somewhat larger than females. It belongs to a group of mollies known as sailfins, named for the large males' sail-like dorsal fin, a feature that is especially pronounced in P. velifera. The species occurs in a range of habitats, from coastal lagoons, estuaries, and salt marshes to freshwater pools in the interior of the peninsula; it is particularly associated with mangrove swamps and sinkholes known as cenotes.

Yucatán mollies are primarily herbivorous, but also consume small invertebrates, adjusting their diet to available resources. They are preyed upon by a variety of larger fish, birds, and crocodilians, and are host to a diverse parasite fauna. Much of their time is spent browsing for food and maintaining their bodies. Males are divided into size-based classes, which differ in appearance and behavior: the largest males flare their dorsal fin when they spar with other males and when they perform courtship displays for females; the smallest males remain hidden among females and mate through quick thrusts; and the intermediate males may employ either strategy. A few weeks after mating, females give birth to live young. P. velifera produces viable hybrids with other mollies, including the naturally occurring P. mexicana×P. velifera.

Although classified as a vulnerable species owing to threats in its native range, the Yucatán molly has been introduced to South America, Africa, and Asia through both mosquito control efforts and the ornamental fish trade. Its striking coloration and enlarged fins made it a popular species in the fishkeeping hobby, in which it has been selectively bred and hybridized to produce a variety of fancy mollies.

== Taxonomy ==
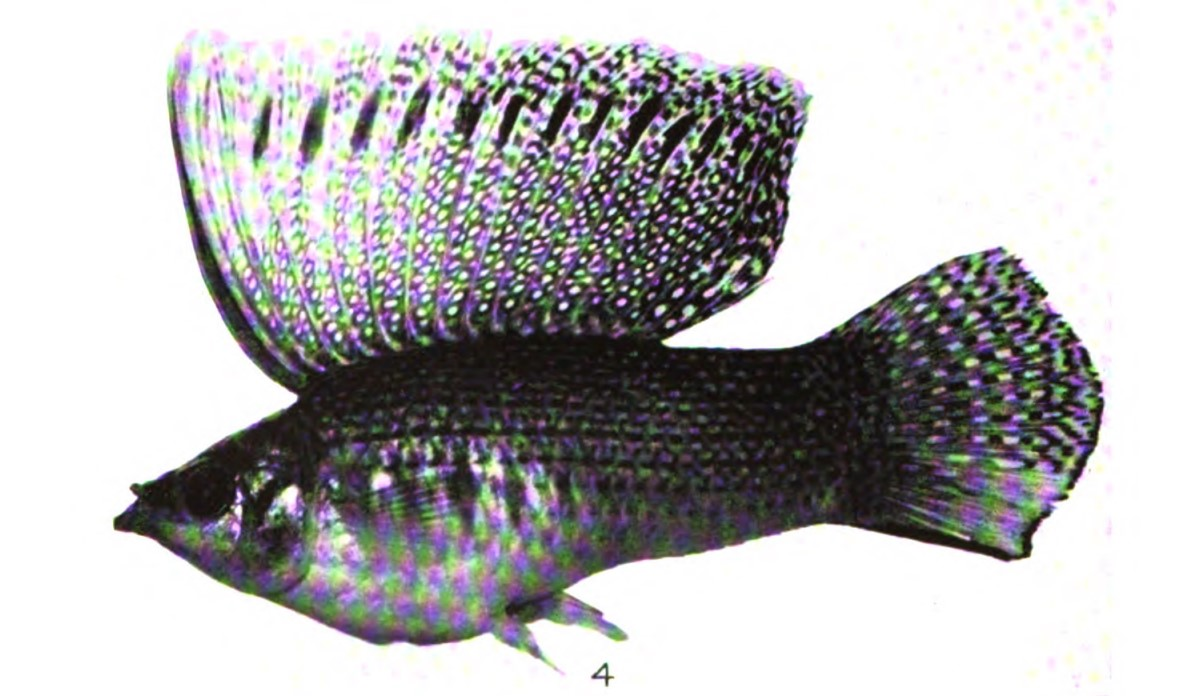
A topotype male from Progreso

Yucatán mollies were misidentified in the early twentieth century as Mollienesia latipinna, with records from Progreso, Yucatán, and Isla Mujeres in 1902, from La Vega in Yucatán (misattributed to Tamaulipas) in 1904, and from a ciénega wetland near Progreso in 1906. The aquarist Johann Paul Arnold gave two males and one female, imported from Progreso to Germany for the ornamental fish trade, to the ichthyologist Charles Tate Regan. Regan described them as a new species, Mollienesia velifera, in 1914 and deposited them in the British Museum.

- - Shortfin mollies
    - - P. catemaconis
      - P. sphenops
    - - - P. gillii
        - P. orri
      - - - P. mexicana
          - P. sulphuraria
        - P. butleri
  - Sailfin mollies
    - - P. latipinna
      - P. velifera
    - - P. kykesis
      - P. latipunctata

Phylogenetic relationships based on combined D-loop and ND2 genetic data

In a major taxonomic revision of poeciliid fish in 1963, the genus Mollienesia was subsumed into Poecilia, after which the species has been known as Poecilia velifera. Within Poecilia, it is placed in the subgenus Mollienesia alongside similar fishes collectively known as mollies. Mollies are divided into two groups: shortfins and sailfins. P. velifera belongs to the sailfins, named after the males' sail-like dorsal fin; the specific epithet velifera means "sail carrier". The species is commonly known as the Yucatán molly or sailfin molly and, in its native range, as topote de aleta grande in Spanish.

Before the advent of genetic studies, P. latipinna was suggested as the ancestor of P. velifera; their close resemblance to P. kykesis also gave rise to the suggestion that the three might represent a single, variable species. It has subsequently been shown that the sailfin mollies form a species complex, a group of distinct but closely related species. These fall into two sister lineages: one adapted to salt water, comprising P. velifera and its closest relative, P. latipinna, and another associated with fresh water, comprising P. kykesis and P. latipunctata. Compared with shortfin mollies, the sailfin species P. velifera, P. latipinna, and P. kykesis show more pronounced differences between males and females, the males displaying their enlarged dorsal fin during courtship and competitive interactions. These traits were likely present in the last common ancestor of the sailfin mollies.

== Description ==
The most distinctive feature of Poecilia velifera is its dorsal fin. It bears 15 to 21 rays, more than the dorsal fins of other sailfin mollies. This fin rises exceptionally high in males, surpassing that of any other molly. Its base is long, extending over much of the back, and its color is dark with many pale spots, including bluish-green markings edged in black; in males, a row of larger dark spots is often present near the outer edge. The anal fin contains 10 rays. The pectoral fins are about as long as the head, and the pelvic fins reach the front of the anal fin; in males, one pelvic ray is elongated and equals the length of the gonopodium (male reproductive appendage). The tail fin is normally rounded and nearly plain; the lower corner may be slightly extended, and the upper part may show spotting, while the lower part remains unmarked and edged in black.

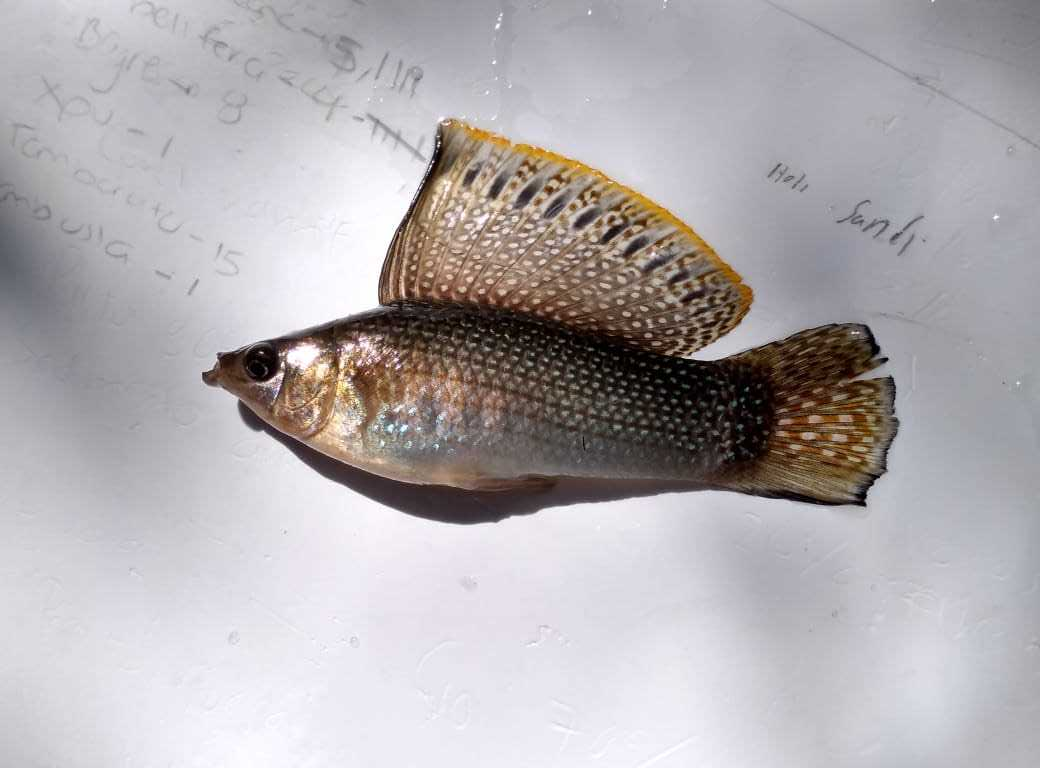
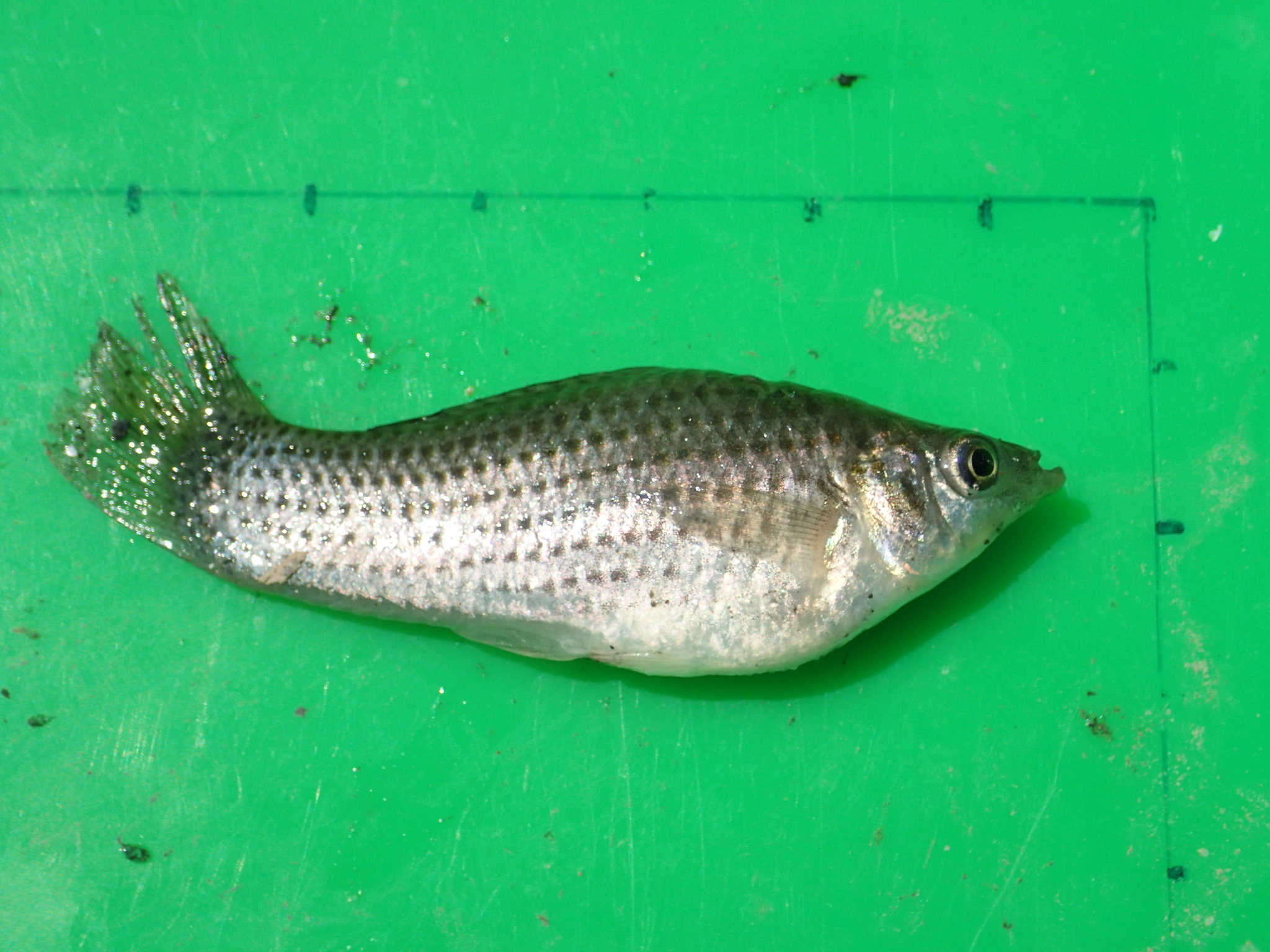
An enlarged dorsal fin distinguishes males from females and other mollies.

As in most poeciliids, the body is elongated—though relatively deeper—and the head is wedge-shaped, with moderately sized eyes set widely apart. The overall body color is olive green. Along the back and sides run dark brown longitudinal stripes, with broader ones following the rows of scales and narrower ones between them. Between these stripes are rows of small, iridescent spots, typically two on each scale, producing a characteristic shimmering effect; these markings, more vivid in males, take on green and bluish tones against a warm, golden ground color. The underside and head often shift toward greenish to orange hues with a subtle metallic blue sheen, and some individuals show irregular dark blotching across the body. Near the front of the body are three or four dark vertical bars, mostly concealed by the pectoral fins.

Adult males in the collection of the Autonomous University of Yucatán measure 7.2–9.3 cm in total length (including tail fin; TL) and 5.7–7.5 cm in standard length (excluding tail fin; SL), whereas females measure 4.5–7.2 cm TL. Specimens as long as 15 cm have also been recorded. Males are polymorphic with respect to size and color and may be broadly divided into three size classes: large males, which are ornamented; intermediate males, which may be ornamented or unornamented ("cryptic"); and small males, which resemble females in coloration and fin size. P. velifera can be distinguished from the closely related P. kykesis by its larger head, lower scale count, distinctive coloration, and, above all, the much larger dorsal fin of males.

== Distribution and habitat ==
=== Range ===
Distribution of P. velifera (V), P. kykesis (K), P. orri (O), and P. mexicana (M) on the Yucatán Peninsula

Naturally occurring populations of Poecilia velifera are confined to the Yucatán Peninsula in Mexico, where they occur at elevations below roughly 20 m (66 ft) above sea level. The species' native range extends along the peninsula's northern coast from Tulum to a tidal stream located about 50 km (31 mi) southwest of San Francisco de Campeche (just north of latitude 19°30′ N); it encompasses the states of Campeche, Yucatán, and Quintana Roo, including the islands of Mujeres, Cozumel, and Contoy. P. velifera reaches higher population densities in and around two major protected areas in Yucatán: the Ría Lagartos Biosphere Reserve and the state reserve Ciénagas y Manglares de la Costa Norte de Yucatán.

In addition to its coastal range, P. velifera is found in inland cenotes (sinkholes in the karst) in the vicinity of Mérida, the state capital of Yucatán. Most of these cenotes are artificial, and P. velifera was probably planted there by the International Health Board to control mosquitoes. Another inland locality is the Xlaká cenote, a natural formation associated with Maya ruins; the species' occurrence there is likely natural, although introduction by the pre-Columbian Maya remains a possibility. Some inland records may represent populations that recently colonized new areas during hurricane-driven flooding.

Use in mosquito control and the ornamental fish trade has spread P. velifera far beyond Yucatán. It was introduced to Thailand from Taiwan in the 1980s for use in shrimp farms and formed established populations in a brackish section of the Chao Phraya River and in the Songkhla Lake basin. In the 1980s, P. velifera was introduced to Peru and has established itself in coastal environments of the Department of Lima, including the Pantanos de Villa Wildlife Refuge. In Israel, two established populations occur: one recorded in June 1993 in warm springs in the Beit She'an Valley and another in springs south of the Dead Sea, the latter traced to escapees from a nearby fish farm. In 1999, P. velifera was recorded in mangrove creeks in southern Taiwan. First records from the Ain Zayanah lagoon in Libya date from 2019; the fish likely originated from deliberate aquarium releases and subsequently became well established and abundant. The species is further established in Singapore, Colombia, and in the Paraíba do Sul basin in Brazil.

=== Habitat preferences ===
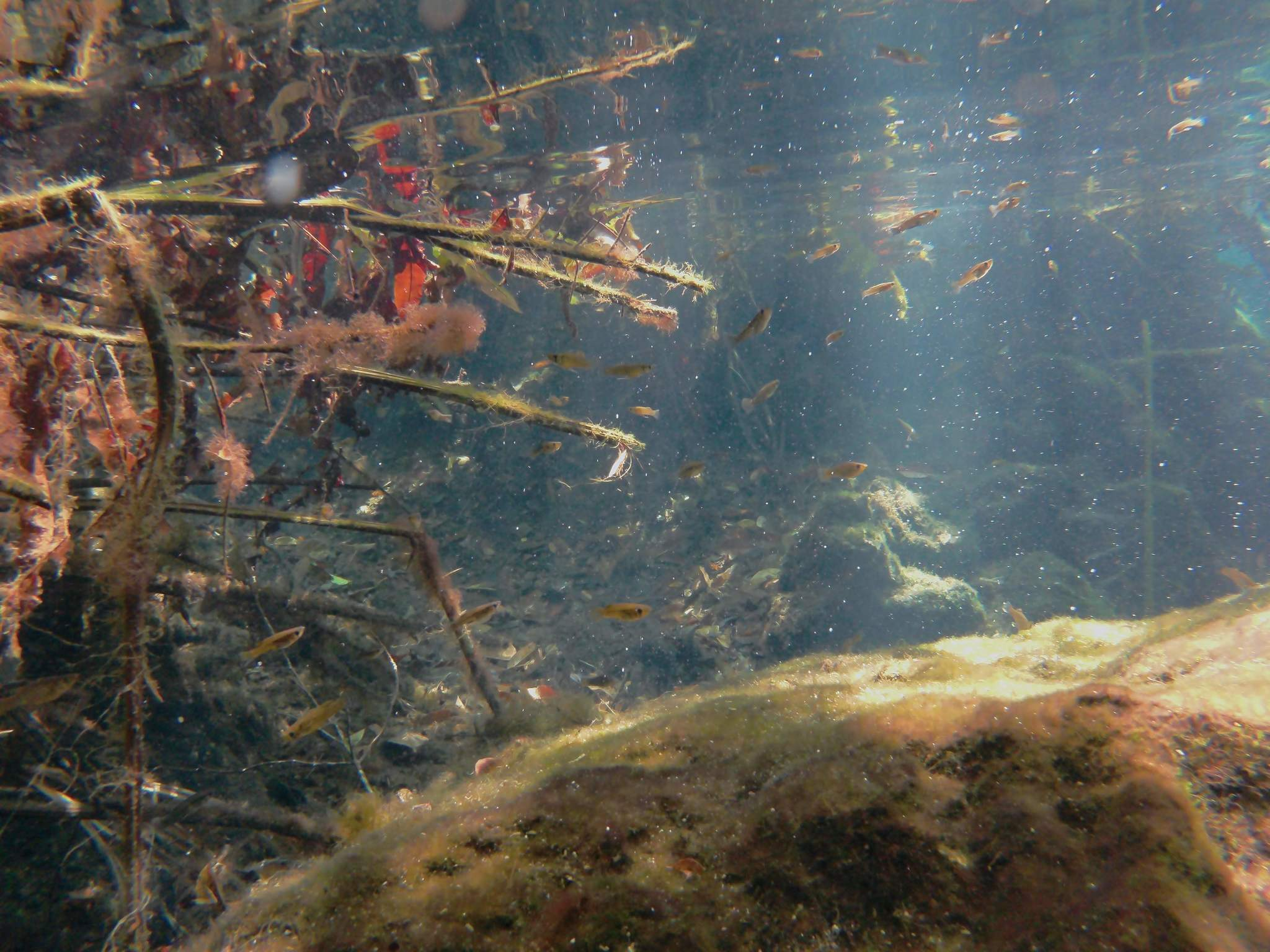
Yucatán mollies in a cenote near Tulum. They are common in still or slowly moving brackish waters.

Poecilia velifera can live in both fresh and salt water, tolerating a broad range of salinities, but is most successful in fresh water. It occupies a variety of near-coastal and coastal habitats, primarily in marine and brackish environments. These include lagoons such as Laguna de Términos, tidal streams, estuaries such as Ria Lagartos, salt marshes, mangrove channels, and coastal cenotes and freshwater pools. The contiguity of the Yucatán molly's habitats leaves movement largely unimpeded, resulting in potentially substantial gene flow among adjacent populations. Even so, populations from different parts of the peninsula are often genetically distinct from one another, possibly shaped by patterns of nearshore ocean currents between the Bay of Campeche and the Atlantic coast.

Habitat preference separates P. velifera from Yucatán's other sailfin molly, P. kykesis, which favors freshwater rivers and reservoirs in the interior of the peninsula. P. velifera occurs together with one of two shortfin mollies—P. mexicana or P. orri—at several sites. In shallow swamp waters near Sisal, Yucatán, dominated by red mangrove and with white and black mangroves also present, P. velifera occurs together with P. mexicana; other fish that sporadically occur there with mollies include Yucatán tetra, pike topminnow, twospot livebearer, giant killifish, Yucatán flagfish, and Jack Dempsey and firemouth cichlids. In Quintana Roo, both P. velifera and a smaller population of P. orri have been recorded in a small cenote. At a site in Campeche, P. velifera inhabits a small natural impoundment enlarged by dredging together with P. kykesis and P. mexicana, representing the only reported locality where all three species co-occur; males of P. velifera there are outnumbered almost 3:1 by those of the accompanying molly species.

A group of females feeding off rocks. Algae and plants are a standard feature of Yucatán mollies' habitats.

P. velifera occurs over diverse substrates, including sand, mud, fine loose silt, shell debris, accumulations of decaying plant material, gravel, and rock. Plant growth is common across habitats but not ubiquitous. Where vegetation occurs, it typically consists of mangroves, cattails, and pondweed; algae such as Chara are also common. In freshwater cenotes, plant communities may also include water lilies, water milfoil, and bladderworts. Individuals are usually found in shallow water, typically less than 1 m (3.3 ft) deep; in some inland cenotes, adults have been recorded at greater depths, reaching about 3 m (9.8 ft). Water clarity ranges from clear to turbid, including green and dark, tea-stained waters colored by decaying vegetation. Currents are typically absent or weak, and temperatures range from 25 to 30°C.

Habitat loss and degradation pose a potential threat to Poecilia velifera. These impacts include changes to water flow, channel modification, pollution, and sediment accumulation within its range. Its population is declining; over roughly 20 years, urbanization and highway construction have wiped out two of the approximately 28 known subpopulations. Consequently, the International Union for Conservation of Nature lists P. velifera as a vulnerable species, and it is protected under Mexican law. Because it is widely recorded throughout its range, P. velifera has been proposed as a flagship species for wildlife conservation in coastal Yucatán habitats.

== Ecology ==
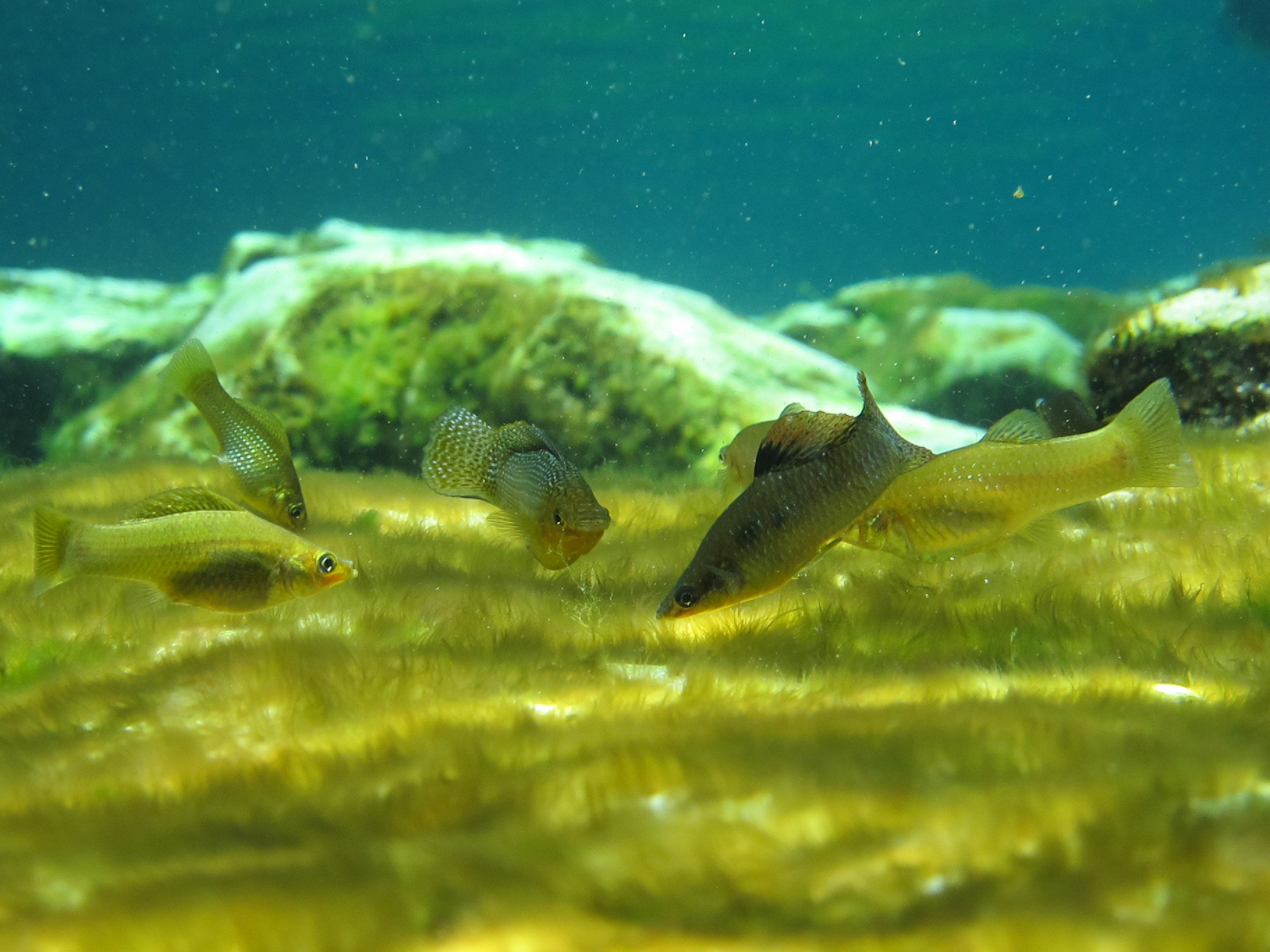
A mixed-sex group feeding. Yucatán mollies prefer algae; invertebrates are only occasionally taken.

Poecilia velifera is a generalist feeder, browsing along substrates, stones, or other objects. Its preferred food items are filamentous algae and diatoms, but it also takes crustaceans and insects. In nutrient-poor waters such as El Aerolito cenote, P. velifera feeds on whatever organic material enters from outside the system, especially insects and plant matter. Its diet shifts with changing conditions, narrowing when certain resources are abundant and broadening when they are scarce. This flexibility allows it to persist where food availability is uneven and seasonal.

Yucatán mollies fall prey to several species of cichlids and marine fish, including Lutjanus, Arius, Strongylura, Gobiomorus dormitor, and Megalops atlanticus. They are also preyed upon by wading birds, such as herons, egrets, and storks, and by reptiles, such as Morelet's and American crocodiles. Antipredator responses are rapid and stereotyped: when startled, particularly by the shadow of a bird passing overhead, individuals dart away from the surface and seek refuge in submerged cover. Poecilia velifera also hosts a diverse parasite fauna, including the roundworms Contracaecum and Cucullanus; the flukes Clinostomum complanatum, Saccocoelioides sogandaresi, Centrocestus formosanus, and Ascocotyle diminuta, A. macrostoma, A. megalocephala, A. nana, and A. tenuicollis; the flatworm Gyrodactylus; and the crustaceans Argulus and Ergasilus.

== Behavior ==
=== Routine activities ===
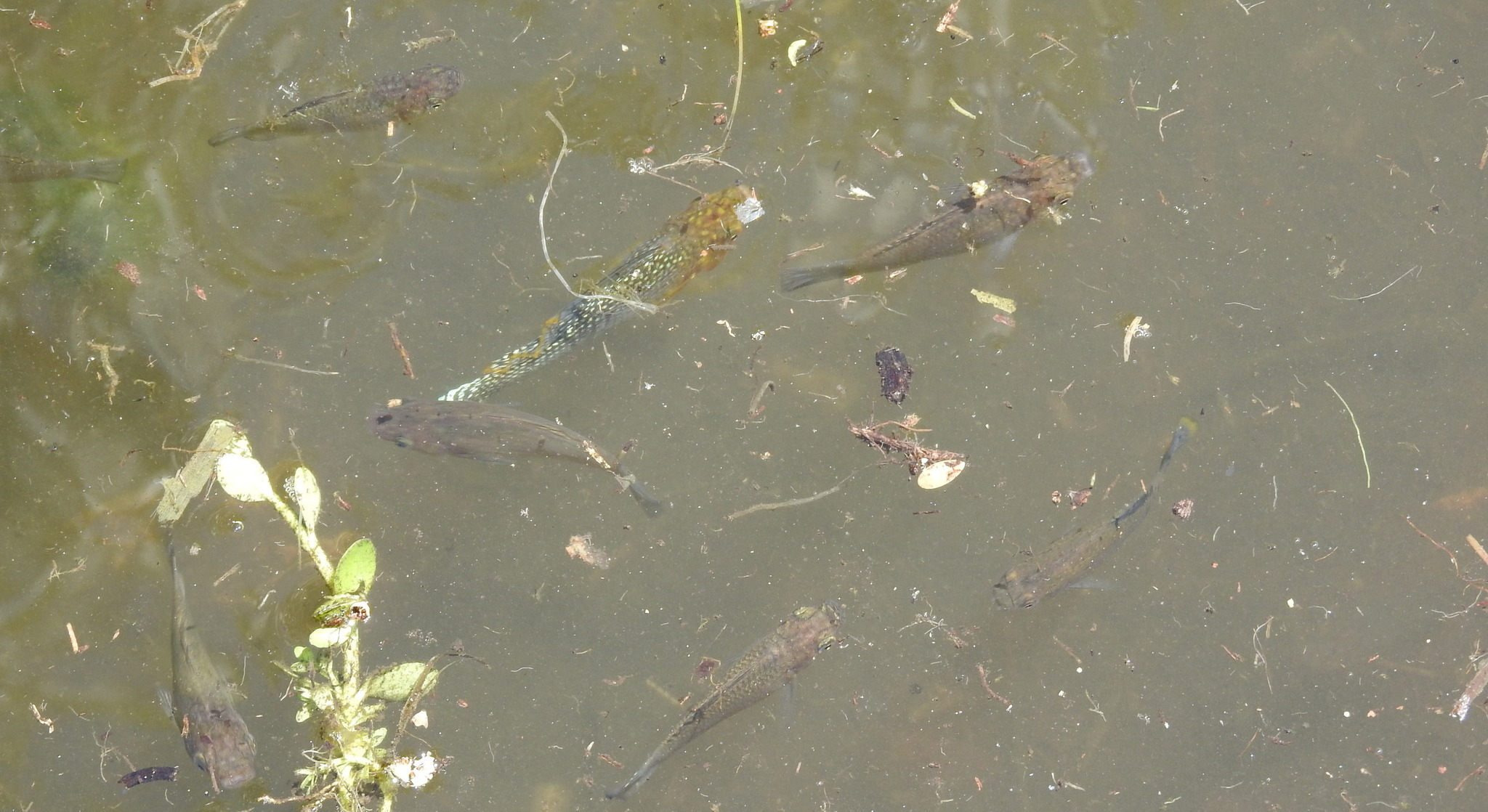
Mollies often congregate at the water surface to breathe or produce splashes with their fins.

Yucatán mollies spend considerable time engaged in routine maintenance activities. Fish often seek shelter among mangrove roots, beneath submerged logs, or in other protected locations, where they remain still for extended periods. Body maintenance includes rubbing the sides of the body against hard surfaces such as rocks or wood.

When engaged in surface respiration, individuals congregate near the water surface, swimming slowly or remaining nearly stationary while rhythmically opening and closing the mouth and gill covers. Mollies may also briefly lunge upward to the surface, forcefully raising either the dorsal or the caudal fin to produce a splash—sometimes repeating this several times—and may also stop swimming to adopt a vertical, head-up posture; the purpose of these behaviors remains unknown.

=== Social interactions ===
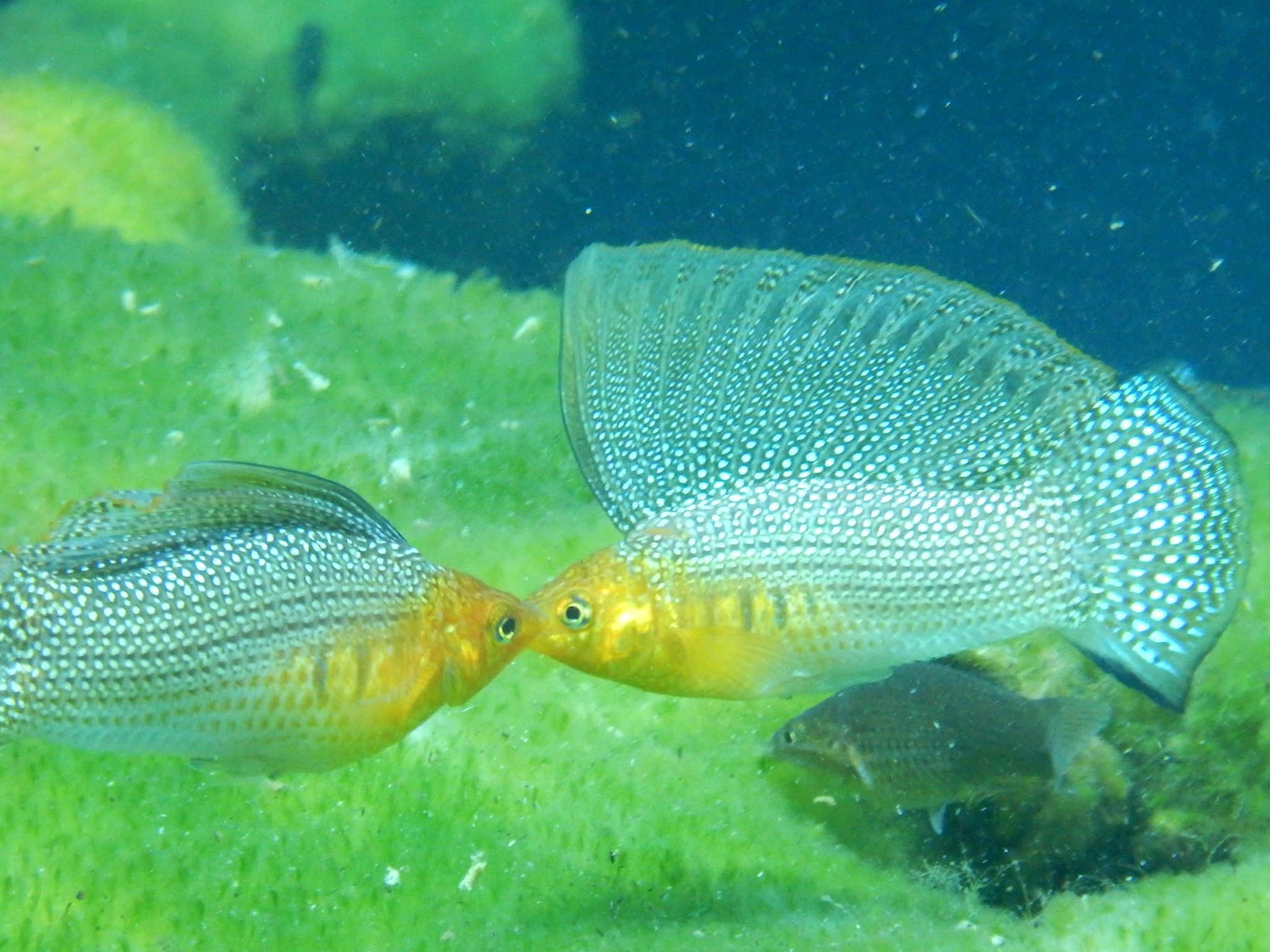
Males flare their dorsal fin at rivals before striking or biting them.

Male interactions often begin with harassment and may escalate into territorial and aggressive displays. A male may then confront another by swimming directly toward it while fully extending the dorsal fin and opening the mouth. If the interaction continues to escalate, both individuals flare their dorsal fins, bend into distinct S-shaped postures, and strike with flanks, tails, or bites. Subordinate or threatened males typically end such encounters by breaking off abruptly and fleeing with rapid changes in direction. Where P. mexicana occurs alongside P. velifera, P. velifera males may be harassed—and females sexually pursued—by large-class P. mexicana males.

Space use varies with sex and size class. Large males move alone across broader areas, whereas smaller ornamented males are more restricted to particular sections of the habitat. Females range freely between open water and mangrove margins. Cryptic males, in contrast to others, remain within groups of females and avoid fighting with other males, which leaves them more time for body cleaning and mating. Some smaller or subordinate individuals also track larger males at a close but consistent distance, following them at roughly 10–30 cm (3.9–12 in) behind while matching their swimming speed.

In an experimental group setting, alpha males have been shown to exert dominance over all other group members. Males direct butting behavior—gentle nipping toward the genital region—primarily toward females, and this may at times be followed by thrusting the gonopodium toward the gonopore (genital opening). The same form of butting also occurs between males; it may be accompanied by gonopodial thrusting when interactions are not overtly aggressive. Females form their own hierarchies but engage in substantially fewer confrontations, and they too assert dominance over subordinate males.

== Reproduction ==
=== Mating strategies ===
Reproductive behavior in Poecilia velifera includes courtship displays and rapid mating attempts; these behaviors vary among males of different sizes and appearances. Males often converge on individuals already attended by rivals. They may briefly nibble the female's gonopore while moving behind or slightly beneath her; this is followed by swinging the gonopodium forward in an effort to insert its tip into the gonopore and transfer sperm to the female's oviduct. Females choose mates based on body size, preference consistently given to males bearing larger dorsal fins, even when those males belong to a different sailfin species.

A male courting a female in a cenote. He tilts towards her while extending his fin and curving his body.

Larger, ornamented males rely on conspicuous courtship combined with thrusting attempts. They approach females with elaborate visual displays, fully extending the dorsal fin and curving the body into an S-shape, and may engage in vigorous chases. Even so, their mating attempts are frequently disrupted, as rival males seize the opportunity to rush in and attempt rapid inseminations while the displaying male is occupied. Courtship often does not lead to mating attempts and may function not only as a signal to females but also as a way of blocking rival males from accessing the female.

Small males adopt a markedly different strategy, dispensing with courtship and instead attempting quick, unannounced inseminations. Intermediate ornamented males show a more flexible approach, displaying primarily when larger competitors are absent but otherwise relying on similar rapid thrusting attempts. Intermediate cryptic males avoid direct competition altogether, remaining within groups of females rather than engaging rivals. They also perform gonoporal nibbling more frequently, which may help them identify females that are ready to mate. By staying close to females and making repeated mating attempts with little interference, they achieve more frequent copulations than larger males.

=== Fecundity and development ===
Poecilia velifera is a livebearing species, whose females produce fully formed young. In its native range, breeding appears to extend from late February to late July, and in some cenotes, reproductive activity may occur almost throughout the year. Females have been recorded reproducing at lengths as short as about 4 cm TL, and the reported sex ratio is approximately one male to every two or three females. Brood size increases with body size: at around 6 cm TL, females give birth to approximately 47 fry; the average brood is about 77. The smallest broods may contain as few as 10 fry, whereas larger females can produce up to 120.

Reproductive performance varies with environmental conditions. It is highest in fresh water, where individuals grow faster, reach larger sizes, and mature earlier, whereas increasing salinity is associated with reduced feeding, slower growth, and smaller adult size. Gestation lasts approximately 28 to 40 days at temperatures of 25–30 °C. The very young are robust and conspicuously marked by broad vertical bars and a white border along the edge of the anal fin, distinguishing them from P. latipinna fry. Newborns measure about 9–11 mm TL, regardless of the size of the mother.

=== Hybridization ===
Poecilia velifera has an XY sex-determination system, females carrying two X chromosomes and males one X and one Y chromosome. In crosses with closely related species such as P. latipinna and certain domesticated stocks of P. sphenops, offspring showed normal male-to-female ratios, indicating that the sex chromosomes function properly even in hybrids. In contrast, crosses with the more distantly related P. reticulata produced only male offspring, suggesting disrupted female development.

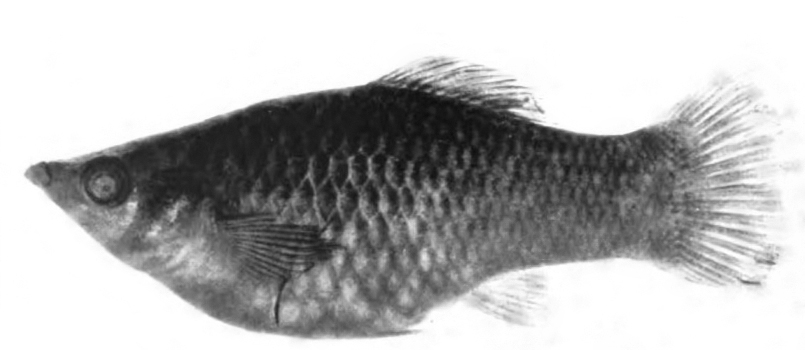
The first wild-caught P. mexicana×P. velifera hybrid, a gravid female, described in 1933. The hybrid was only rediscovered in the wild in 2004.

P. velifera and the shortfin molly P. mexicana—which occur together at one site in Campeche—have been known to produce viable and fertile hybrid offspring both in nature and in laboratory settings since 1933. Such crosses are rare in the wild: despite decades of intensive searching, the next known specimens were not found until 2004. An early-generation hybrid was determined to be the offspring of a male P. velifera and a female P. mexicana. Laboratory tests have shown that female shortfin mollies prefer sailfin males to shortfin males, the former being larger than the latter, which may lead to the occasional breakdown of behavioral barriers that normally prevent crossbreeding.

== Importance to humans ==
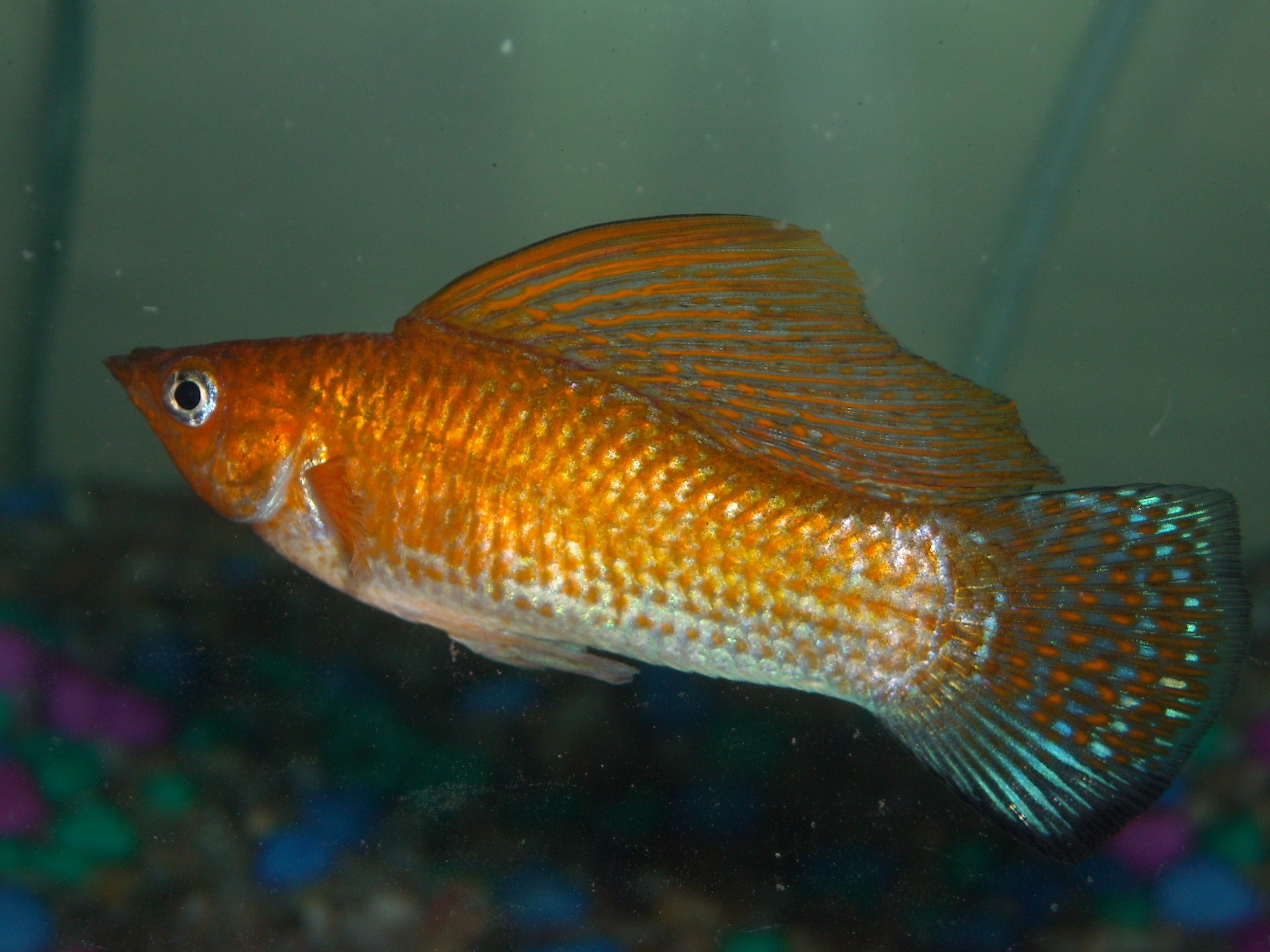
High-finned fancy mollies, such as this male, are derived from P. velifera.

Across the Yucatán Peninsula, Poecilia velifera is one of the most familiar fish species to local inhabitants. It is valued in the ornamental fish trade for its striking appearance, especially its large dorsal fin and natural coloration, as well as its robustness, adaptability to new conditions, tolerance of routine handling, and fast growth. By 1936, it had largely replaced P. latipinna in Germany, where aquarists had also produced a jet-black breed through selective breeding of black-blotched specimens from nature. P. velifera is of particular importance to the ornamental fish trade in North America, and has served as inspiration for the emblem of the American Livebearer Association. By import value, it ranked thirteenth among ornamental fish imported into the United States in October 1992.

There is no evidence that traded fish are collected from the wild; commercially available specimens are instead derived from captive-bred stocks. The vast majority of these come from Southeast Asia—Singapore, Malaysia, Indonesia, and Hong Kong—with Jamaica as the only significant exporter in the Western Hemisphere. Despite its prominence, the species itself is rare in the fishkeeping hobby, as most fish sold as P. velifera are in fact P. latipinna x P. velifera hybrids. Genetic contributions from P. velifera have played a key role in the development of high-finned fancy mollies.
