= Fancy molly =

Aquarium fish

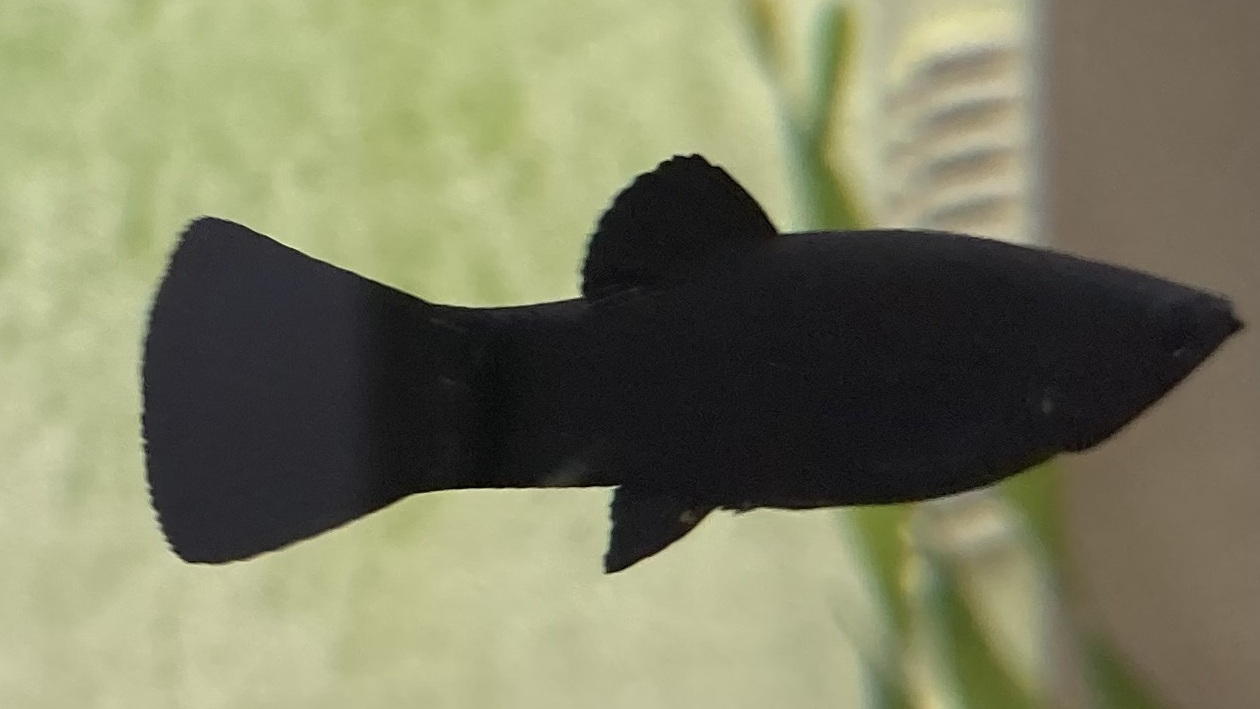
The black molly is a classic aquarium fish.

A fancy molly is any of the domestic strains of mollies (Mollienesia subgenus of Poecilia), which are livebearer fish popularly kept as aquarium pets. The origin of the fancy mollies is unclear, with P. sphenops, P. gillii, P. latipinna, and P. velifera commonly named as parent species. Fancy mollies are widespread in pet stores across the world and commonly marketed as a good choice for aquarists, especially for beginners in the fishkeeping hobby.

== Origins ==
Mollies entered the fishkeeping hobby around 1905. The identity of the species from which the fancy mollies originate is difficult to ascertain because early aquarists crossbred any mollies available to them. In 1969, Kurt Jacobs credited "Crescenty in New Orleans" with developing the black molly through seven years of selective breeding of "Mollienesia formosa" (today synonym for Poecilia formosa). John A. Dawes considers it unlikely that the black molly is derived from P. formosa because P. formosa is an all-female species which reproduces exclusively through gynogenesis. Arthur Rachow, a pioneering aquarist, recorded that he had received black-spotted mollies from Panama, and Charles Tate Regan identified them as Mollienesia formosa. The identification of Lake Gatun as the place of collection of this "Mollienesia formosa" points to the species in question being P. gillii.

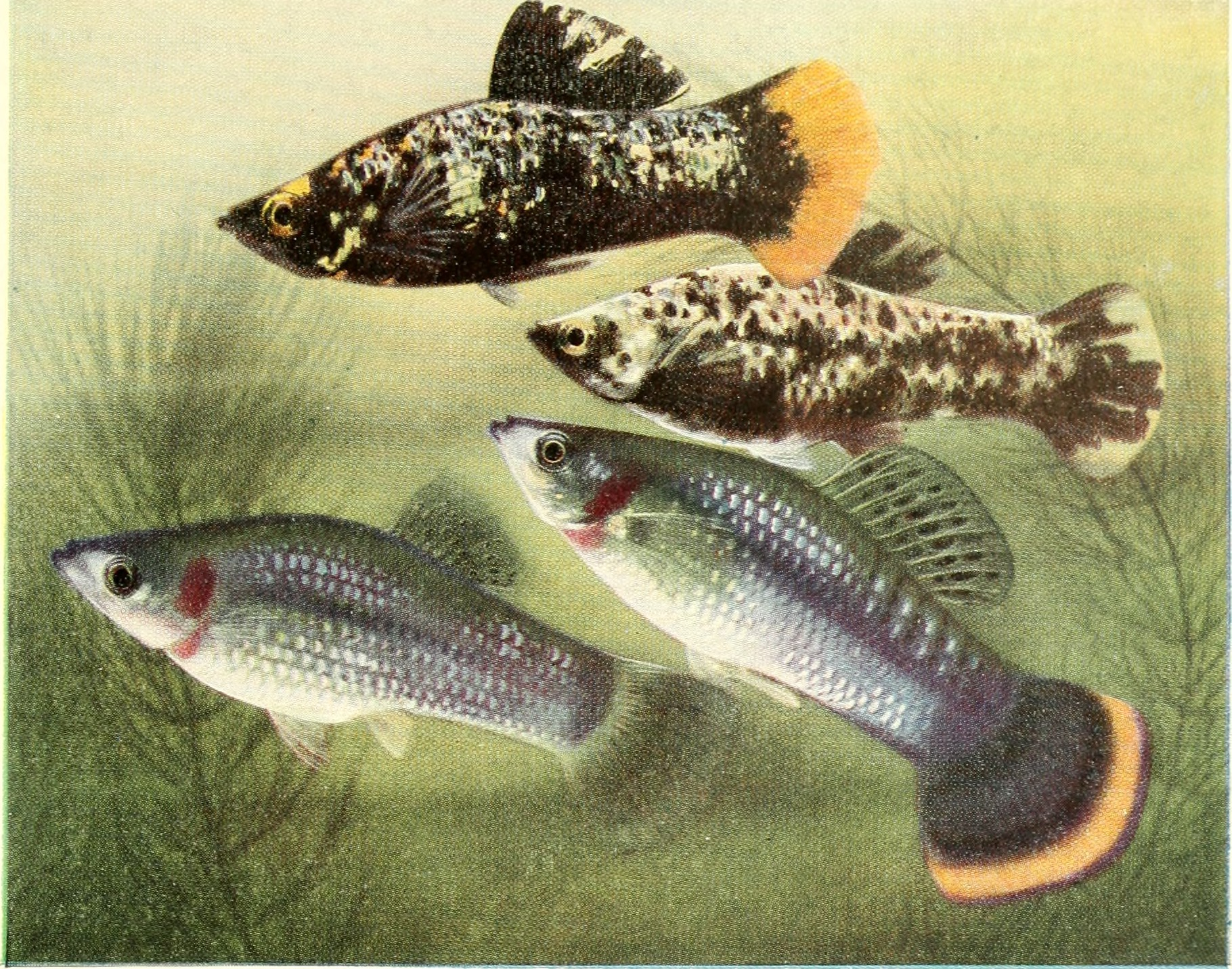
A 1936 illustration of the early fancy mollies side by side with their wild progenitors

Bill Allen, writing for the Tropical Fish Hobbyist, doubts that an aquarist named Crescenty ever existed, and suggests that the black molly was produced by several breeders who worked independently in the 1920s and 1930s. Allen notes that one of the first breeders offering black mollies was Bill Schomberg of Crescent Fish Farm in New Orleans. Black mollies were simultaneously bred by Florida fish farmers Jack Beater and Bill Sternke, among others. The early black mollies were small, with females reaching only 5–6 cm (2.0–2.4 in) and males 4–5 cm (1.6–2.0 in), and were extremely sensitive. They were difficult to breed, producing only 2–20 fry per litter and rarely up to 60. These fish are then said to have been crossed with the wild "liberty molly", producing similarly sized fish with shiny green scales and a rounded dorsal fin.

The black molly is frequently defined in aquarium literature as a breeding form of P. sphenops, but black mollies comprise fish with differing pedigrees. Ichthyologist Eugene K. Balon attributed the creation of the black molly to the crossbreeding of the shortfin P. sphenops and the sailfin P. latipinna. He explains that the high-finned breeds were created by adding P. velifera to the cross.

== Varieties ==
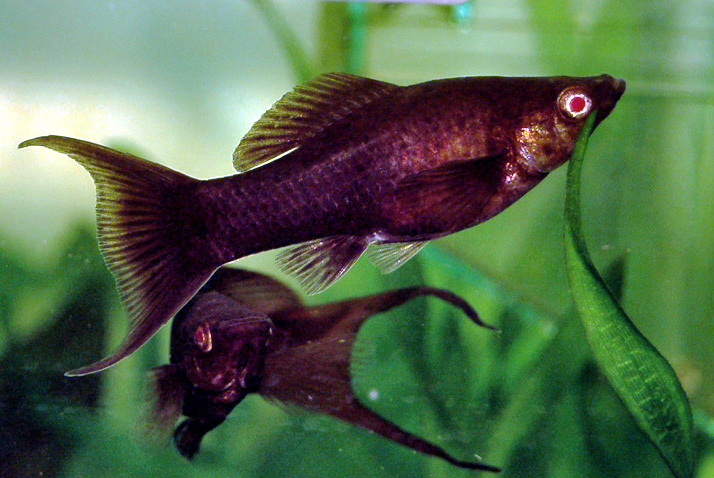
Lyretail black molly

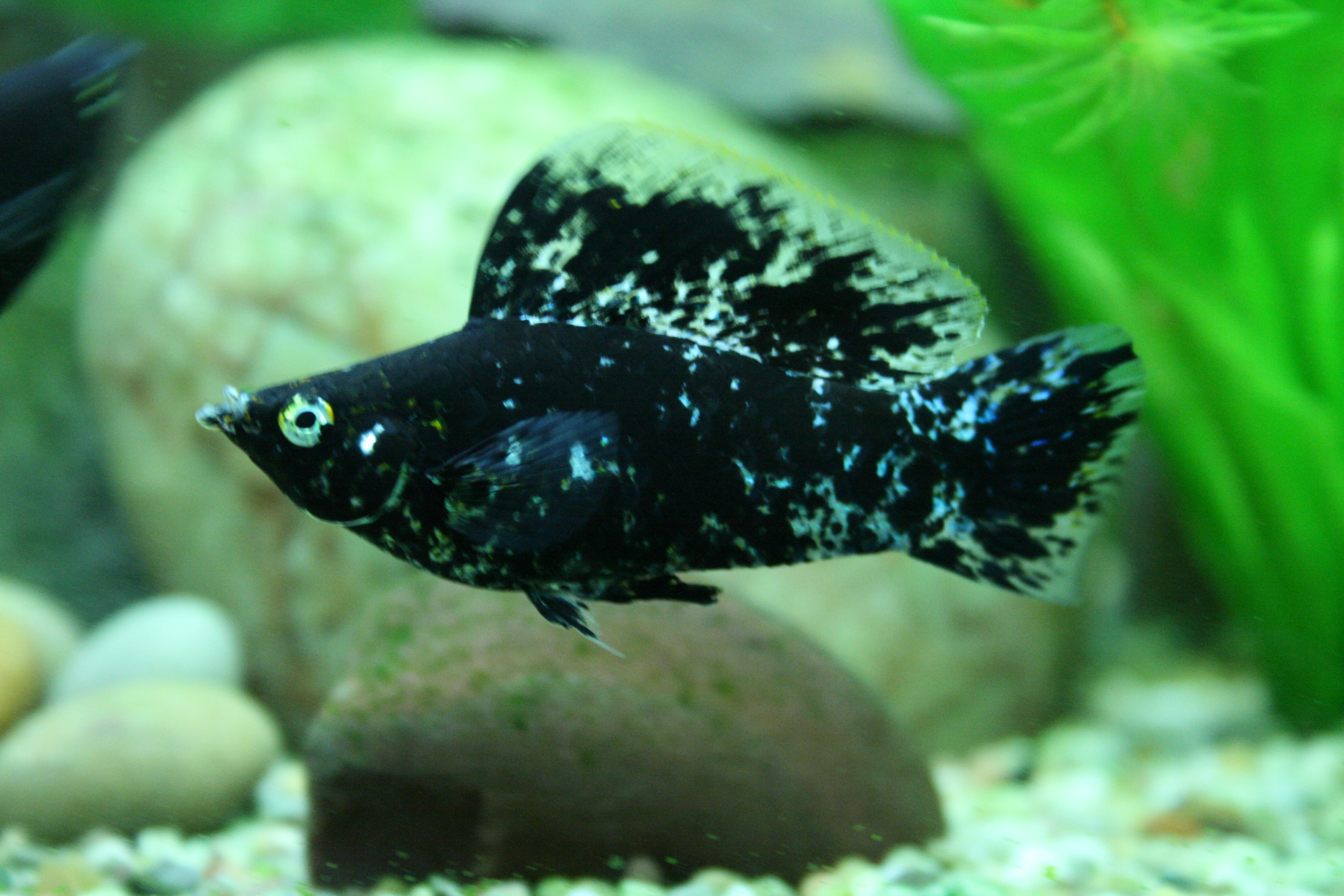
Marbled molly

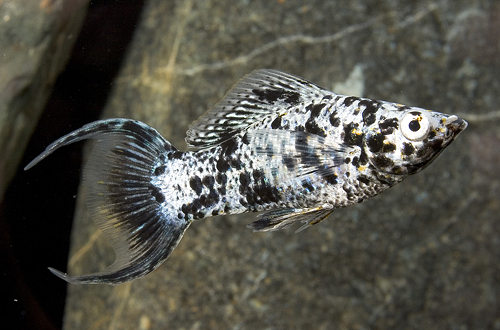
Marbled lyretail molly

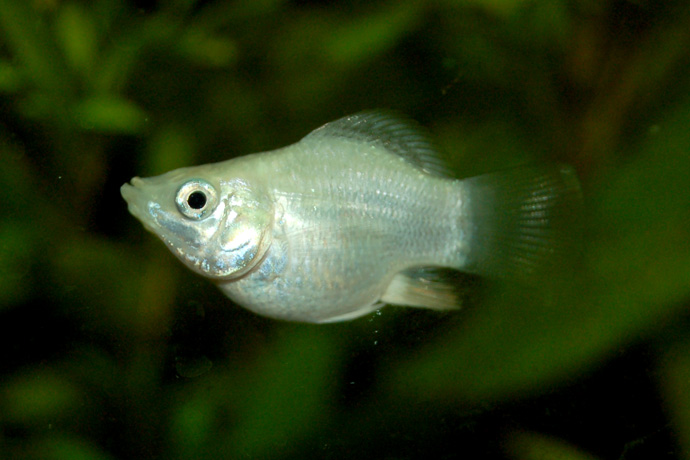
Silver balloon molly

A wide array of fancy molly colors have been developed in addition to the classic black molly.

- Marbled mollies have black blotches, which is a trait found in some wild fish as well. The fully black fish were created by breeding the fish with the largest blotches. The marbled mollies are also traded as salt-and-pepper mollies or Dalmatian mollies.
- Albino mollies are golden-yellow and pink eyes as a result of not producing color pigment. They tend to have poor eyesight.
- Gold mollies are yellow-gold like albino mollies but have dark eyes and occasionally scales edged in red.
- Silver mollies have had all pigments but silver eliminated through selective breeding.
- Chocolate mollies exhibit brown rather than black coloration.

In addition to the colors, fancy mollies differ in the shape of their fins.

- Lyretail mollies have extended upper and lower ends of the caudal fin.
- Veiltail mollies have an enlarged caudal fin.

Color and fin shape are inherited independently and therefore any combination of color and fin shape is possible.

Balloon mollies are a small variety with an extremely deformed abdominal cavity. These mollies are poor swimmers, and due to their deformity have sometimes been cited as examples of cruelty to animals.

== Husbandry ==
Fancy mollies are cheap and ubiquitous fish in pet stores worldwide. They are marketed as easy fish for beginners in fishkeeping. In the aquarium, they can be aggressive to other mollies and to swordtails, but are usually peaceful to other fish. Black mollies are sensitive to the buildup of bacteria and nitrogen compounds and do not tolerate soft water. Suboptimal conditions quickly cause the fish to clamp their fins and rock their bodies, a condition known as shimmying.
