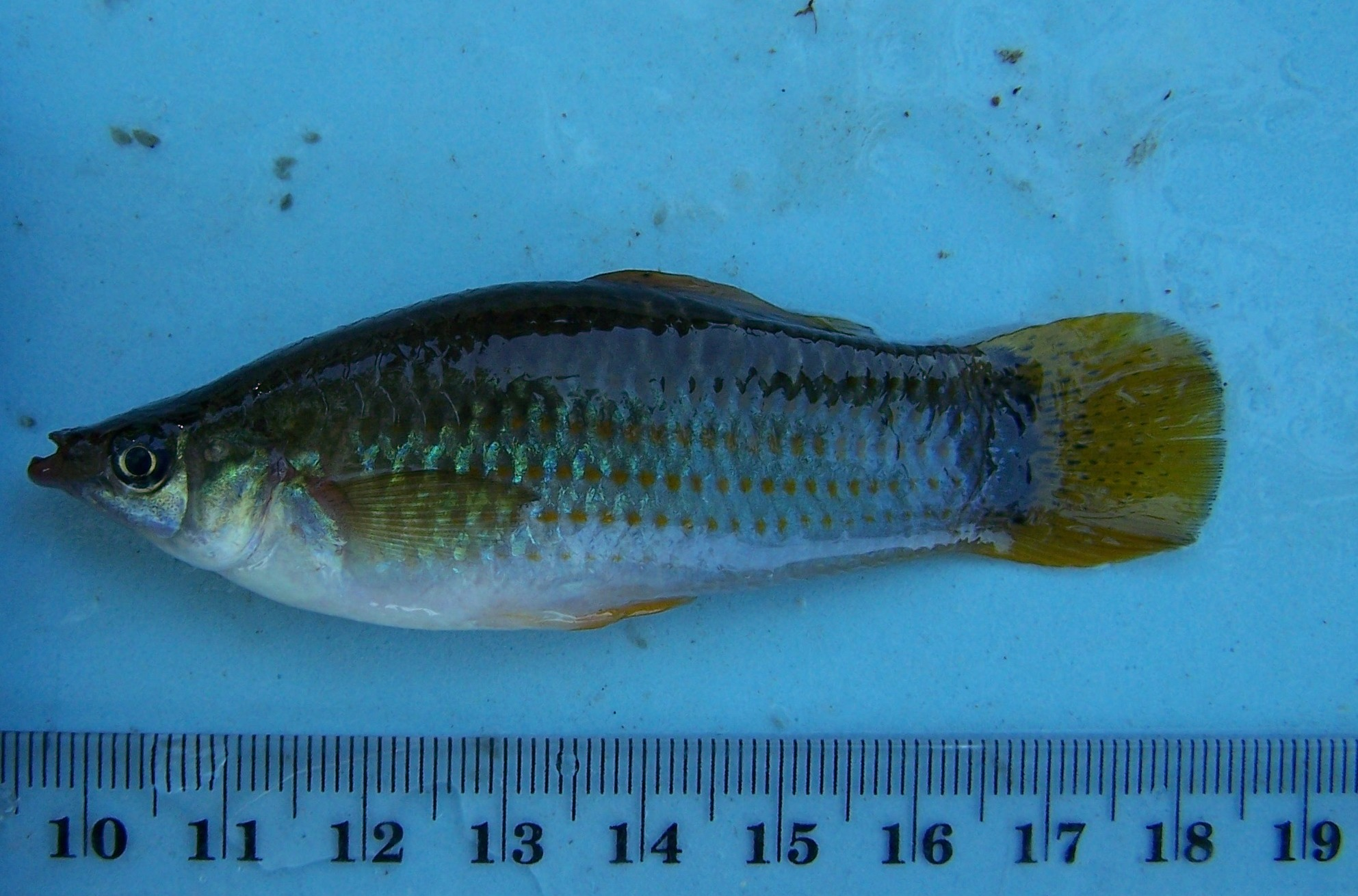
- A male
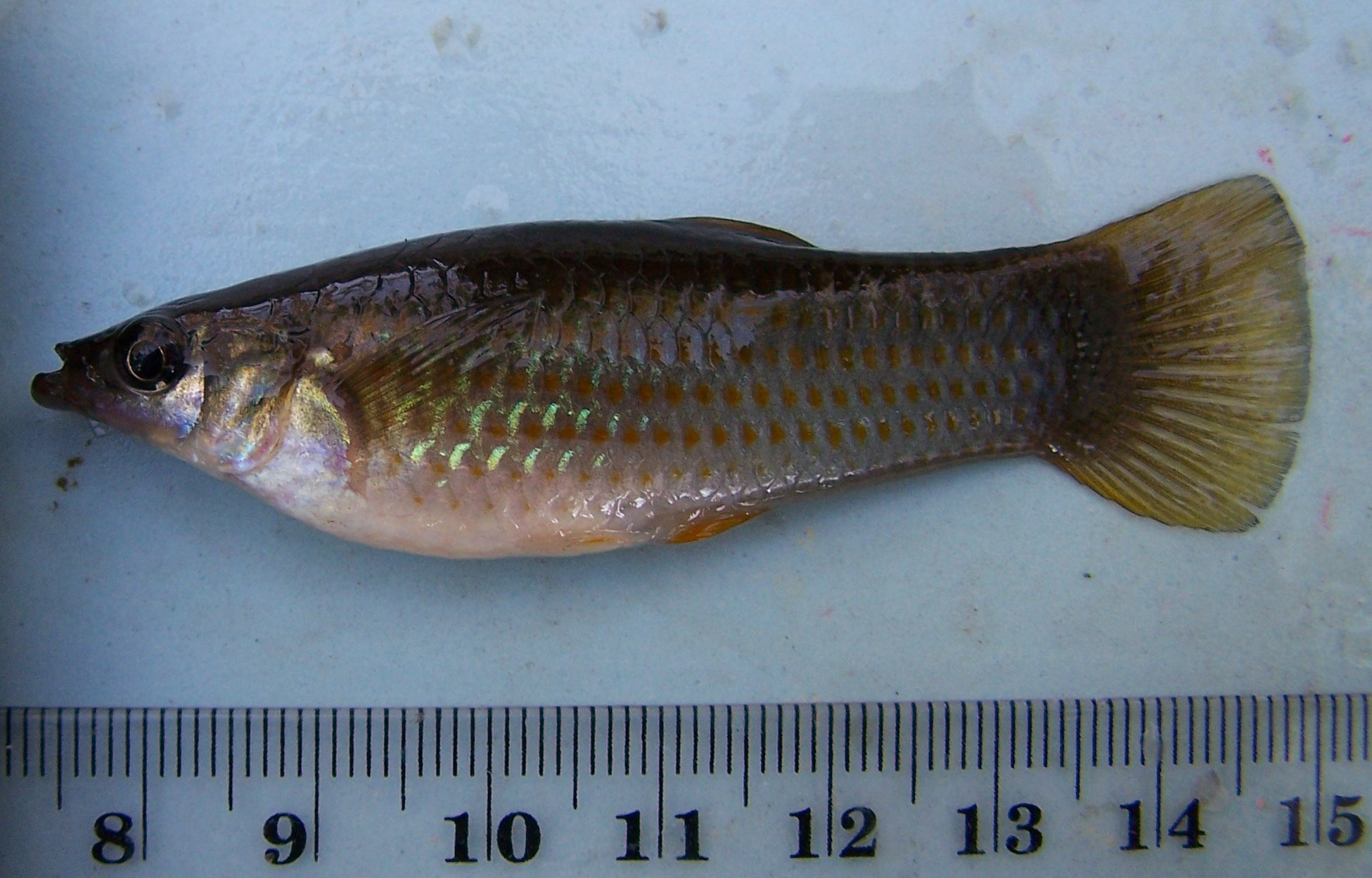
- A female

Conservation status
- Data Deficient (IUCN 3.1)

Scientific classification
- Kingdom: Animalia
- Phylum: Chordata
- Class: Actinopterygii
- Order: Cyprinodontiformes
- Family: Poeciliidae
- Genus: Poecilia
- Species: P. gillii

Binomial name
- Poecilia gillii Kner, 1863

= Poecilia gillii =

Gill's molly

Species of fish

Poecilia gillii, Gill's molly, is a herbivorous livebearer fish distributed throughout Central America. It is found in both moving and still water as well as in both freshwater and brackish habitats. Populations of this species differ in color, size, and morphology.

== Description ==
Poecilia gillii is primarily greyish with blue highlights and rows of yellow spots on the sides. Females from some estuarine habitats are dotted black instead. Most of the fins are yellowish. Adult males differ widely in body size, color, and morphology. Some males develop a long dorsal fin, which, along with the caudal fin, usually has spots or black blotches close to the fish's body. The caudal fin of the males from some tideland populations is edged orange. Some other populations contain males with the dorsal and caudal fins colored red.

The dorsal fin of P. gillii males is among the largest of the non-courting males in the Poecilia sphenops (shortfin molly) species complex. The species is most similar to P. mexicana.

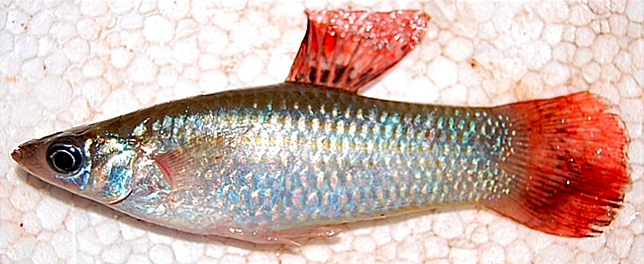
A red fin form male

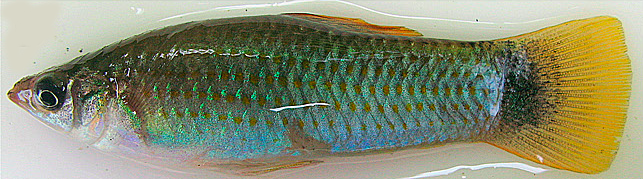
A yellow fin form male

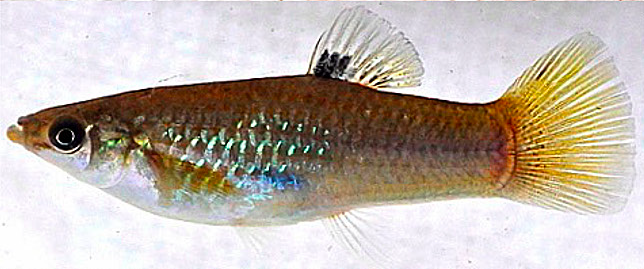
A female

== Distribution and habitat ==
Poecilia gillii is widespread in Central America, occurring from Guatemala to Colombia on its Atlantic slope and up to Costa Rica's Térraba River on the Pacific slope. In Costa Rica, it is the most common freshwater fish species. The molly's range continues in Panama from the Grande River to the Bayano River.

The species is found in greatest numbers in estuaries, swamps, brooks, and shallow waters of large rivers, but also inhabits faster flowing waters. The individuals living in brackish water tend to be larger than those observed in brooks, reaching up to 105 mm. The temperatures of these habitats range from 19 to 37 °C.

In the Pacuare River, a large population was found living over a substrate of algae-covered boulders, pebbles, and sand. Species sharing this habitat include Amatitlania nigrofasciata, Astyanax aeneus, Parachromis dovii, Poeciliopsis retropinna, Sicydium salvini, and Tomocichla sieboldii.

== Diet ==
Poecilia gillii is a detrivorous and herbivorous species. The fish are generally found near the substrate, browsing on detritus, ooze, and filamentous algae.

== Reproduction ==
Poecilia gillii is a livebearer, meaning that females give birth to live fry. It reproduces continuously year-round, with most juveniles appearing in August.

In some poeciliid species, e.g. P. latipinna and Xiphophorus multilineatus, large males court females while small males instead rely on chasing and sneaking up on the females to copulate. While P. gillii males also come in different sizes, neither large nor small males demonstrate courtship. It is hypothesized, therefore, that the purpose of the exaggerated color and fin size of the large males is to intimidate rival males and avoid fighting. The small males are of less conspicuous size and color in order to facilitate sneaking up on females and to avoid aggressive large males. Males, large ones more often than small ones, nibble on the females's sex opening to ascertain the female's receptiveness. Females might prefer large, colorful males. The copulatory organ, called gonopodium, is longer in the small males in order to facilitate the sneaking up and chasing type of copulation.
