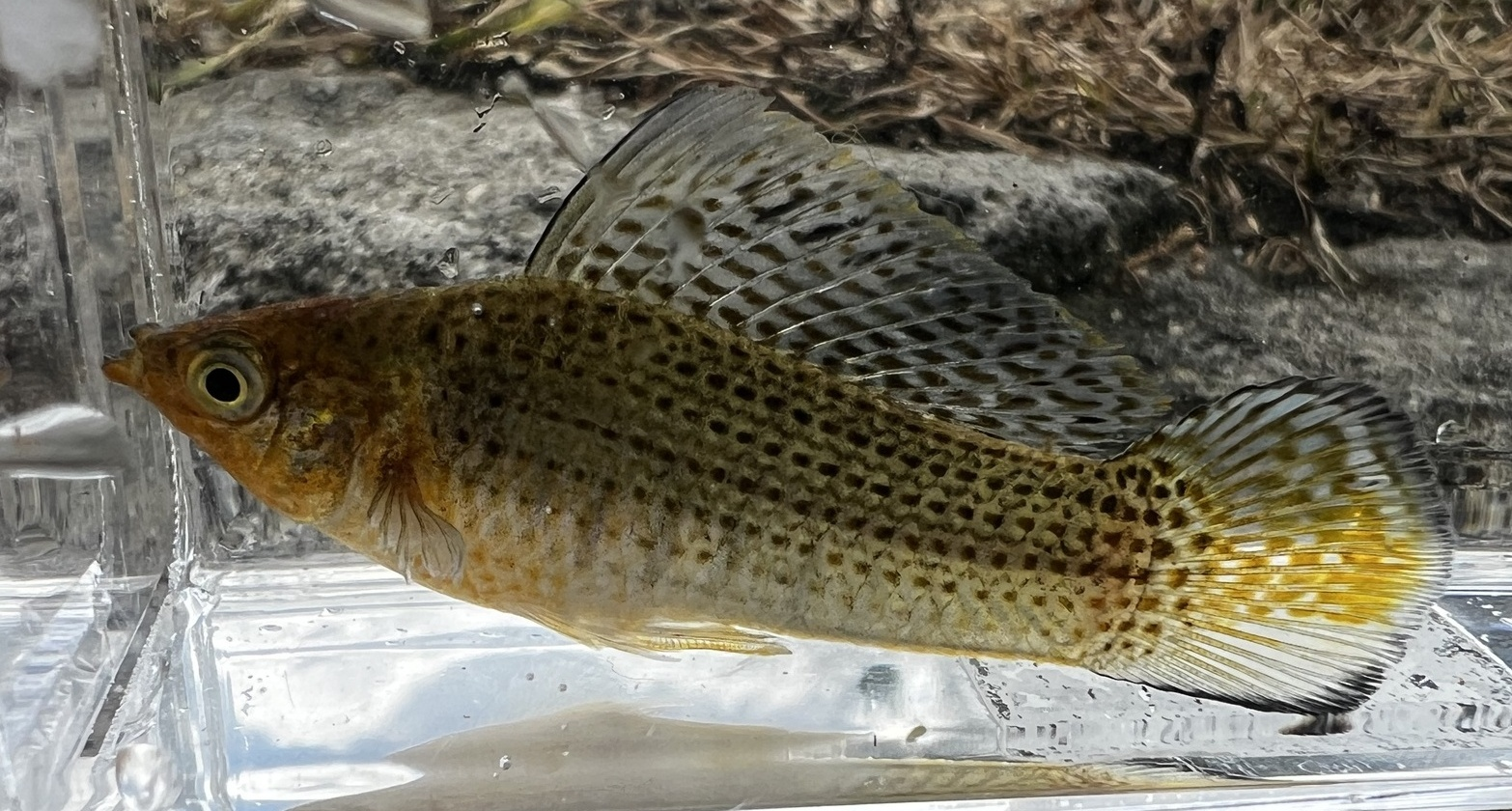
- Male
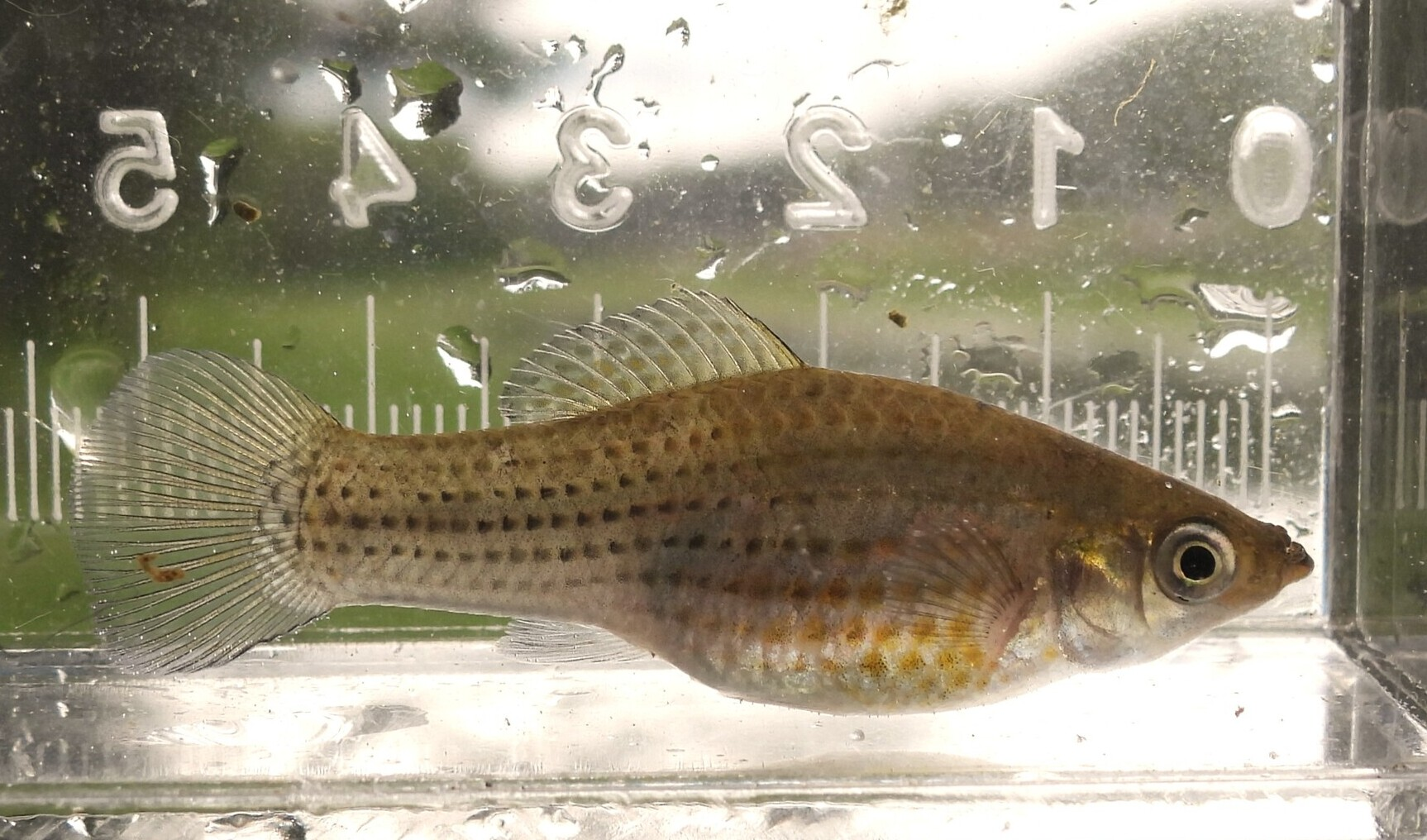
- Female

Conservation status
- Least Concern (IUCN 3.1)

Scientific classification
- Kingdom: Animalia
- Phylum: Chordata
- Class: Actinopterygii
- Division: Teleostei
- Order: Cyprinodontiformes
- Family: Poeciliidae
- Genus: Poecilia
- Species: P. latipinna

Binomial name
- Poecilia latipinna (Lesueur, 1821)

Synonyms
- Mollienesia latipinna Lesueur, 1821; Poecilia multilineata Lesueur, 1821; Poecilia lineolata Girard, 1858; Limia poeciloides Girard, 1858; Limia matamorensis Girard, 1859

= Sailfin molly =

Species of fish

The sailfin molly (Poecilia latipinna) is a livebearer fish typically found in both freshwater and brackish waterways along the East Coast of the United States, from North Carolina south to Florida, and around the Gulf of Mexico to Texas, and south to the Yucatán Peninsula of Mexico. Given their preference for more brackish water conditions, mollies are often found within just a few yards or miles of the ocean, inhabiting coastal estuaries, lagoons, river deltas and swamps, as well as tidal areas (such as mangrove swamps) with a regular inflow of oceanic minerals and nutrients mixing with inland freshwater sources.

== Taxonomy ==
The sailfin molly was originally described in 1821 as Mollienesia latipinna by the naturalist Charles Alexandre Lesueur, who based his description upon specimens from freshwater ponds in the vicinity of New Orleans, Louisiana. However, Lesueur described other collections of the sailfin molly as Mollienesia multilineata in 1821, the same year in which he described M. latipinna. This conflict created confusion and eventually necessitated a ruling by the International Commission on Zoological Nomenclature (ICZN). In 1959, the ICZN placed precedence on the name Mollienesia latipinna Lesueur 1821. In a landmark definitive work on poeciliid fishes, Donn Rosen and Reeve Bailey (1959) noted the priority of Poecilia by Marcus Elieser Bloch and Johann Gottlob Schneider (1801) with regards to Mollienesia by Lesueur (1821), thereby relegating Mollienesia to the synonymy of Poecilia.

== Names ==
Some names for the sailfin molly in other languages include Breitflossenkärpfling (German), seilfinnemolly (Norwegian), zeilvinkarper (Dutch), leveäevämolli (Finnish), molinezja szerokopłetwa (Polish), bubuntis (Tagalog), and molliénésie á voilure or simply "molly voile" (French).

Some confusion occurs with the Yucatan molly, P. velifera. While most names that contain a "sail" element refer to the present species, the German Segelkärpfling, the Latin velifera, and possibly others are used for the Yucatan molly. The French terms are used for both species indiscriminately.

The sailfin molly is also commonly sold in aquarium stores under the name "molly".

== Geographical distribution ==
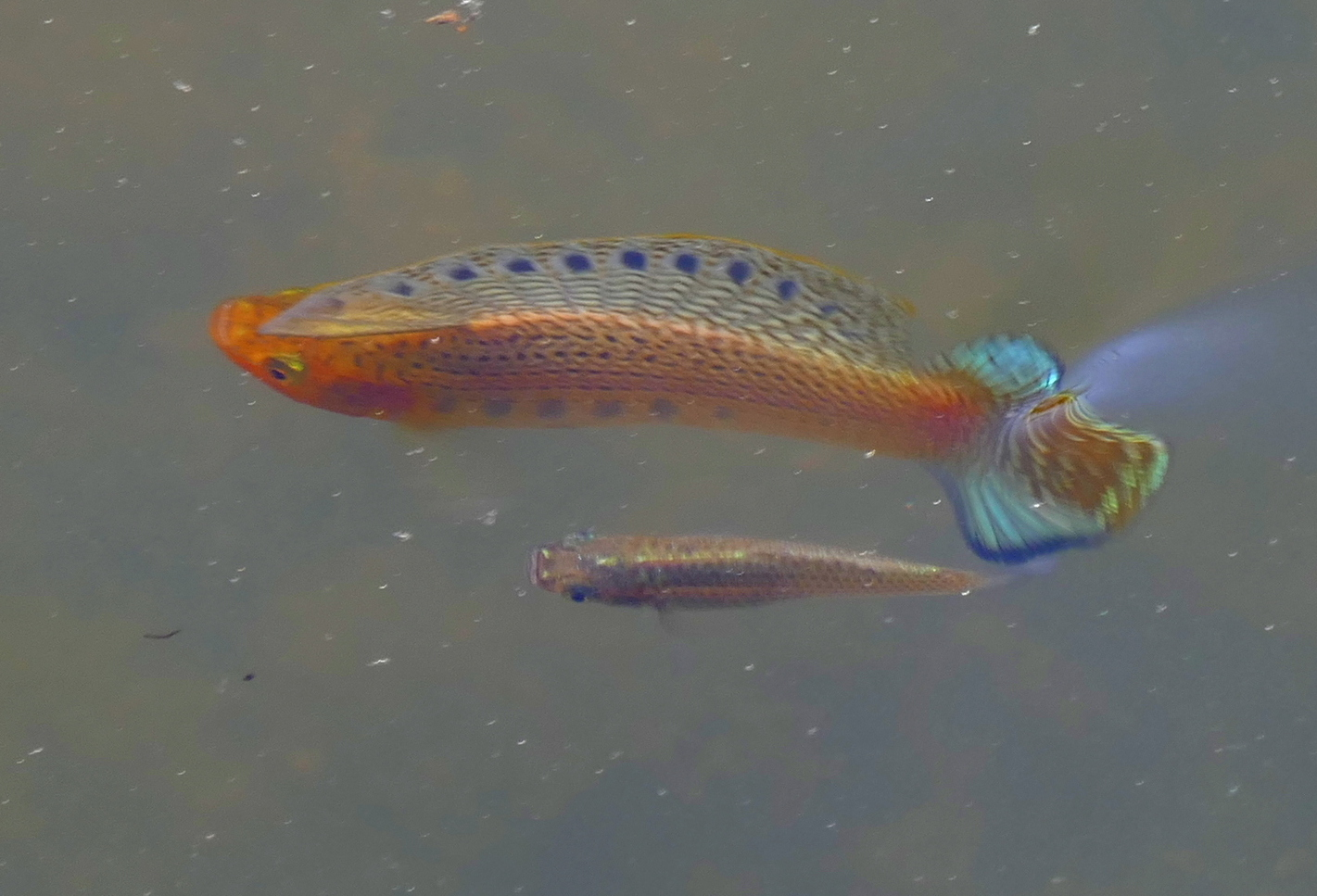
Male displaying to a female, in Florida

The sailfin molly is found in freshwater and brackish habitats from North Carolina to Texas and the Yucatán Peninsula of Mexico. Preferring coastal marshes fed by lowland streams, as well as mangrove swamps, deltas and estuaries, the sailfin molly is very common in peninsular Florida and around the entire Gulf of Mexico. Invasive and introduced populations have been established in New Zealand, in the western U.S., and Hawaii. Sailfin mollies introduced to California have caused a decline in populations of the federally protected and endangered desert pupfish (Cyprinodon macularius). It is also invasive to Iraq, where it thrives in the Persian Gulf waters at the confluence of the Tigris and Euphrates river deltas, threatening to outcompete many killifish species endemic to the region. Interestingly, the sailfin molly was introduced in the 1920s to Banff Hot Spring, in Banff National Park, Alberta, Canada.

== Habitat ==
Sailfin mollies are most commonly observed at the shallow surface waters along the edges of marshes, lowland streams, ponds, swamps, estuaries and even ephemeral water bodies such as roadside ditches. Small to large aggregations of the species are most commonly found under floating vegetation or near structures in the water, minimizing their chances of being observed by potential predators.

The sailfin molly is a tolerant species, as it can exploit the thin film of oxygen-rich surface water with its upturned mouth, so is able to survive oxygen-depleted habitats. A euryhaline species, the sailfin molly may be found in a variety of saline environments, tolerating salinities as high as 87 ppt and breeding in brackish waters.

== Ecology ==
=== Predators ===
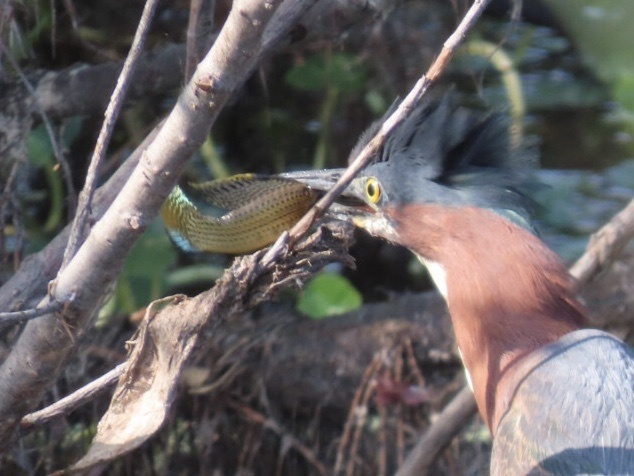
Male caught by a green heron.

Sailfin mollies are members of the lower end of the food chain. As such, they are prey for various animals, including aquatic insects, other fishes, reptiles, amphibians, birds and mammals. Specific examples include: giant water bugs (Belostomatidae), largemouth bass (Micropterus salmoides), American alligator (Alligator mississippiensis), bullfrog (Rana catesbeiana), snowy egret (Egretta thula), and raccoon (Procyon lotor).

=== Parasites ===
The trematode Saccocoelioides sogandaresi is a known parasite of the sailfin molly, as is the ciliated protozoan Ichthyophthirius multifiliis, which causes the disease commonly known as freshwater white spot, freshwater ich, or freshwater ick.

== Biology ==
=== Distinctive features ===
The body of the sailfin molly is essentially oblong. The head is small and dorsally flattened, with a small, upturned mouth. The caudal peduncle is broad and the caudal fin is large, rounded, and sometimes tipped with black. The pelvic fins originate at a point anterior to the dorsal fin. In mature males, the dorsal fin is greatly enlarged (it is this feature that gives the species its common name) and the caudal fin is similarly colorful; these conspicuous secondary sexual features play a role in female mate choices. Females tend to be larger and more plainly colored, a different characteristic to the Poeciliidae. (See: Sexual selection)

It is a smaller fish than the Yucatan molly (P. velifera), though that species often does not grow to full length if bred in an aquarium. The dorsal fins are the most distinctive character: Those of the sailfin molly have less than 15 fin rays, counting where the fin meets the back, whereas the Yucatan molly has 18–19 (intermediate numbers may indicate hybrids). If a male spreads his dorsal fins in a display, in this species it forms a trapezoid, with the posterior edge being shortest. The height of the dorsal fin, measured at the posterior edge, is a bit less than the height of the tail. The male molly is more aggressive than the females.

=== Coloration ===
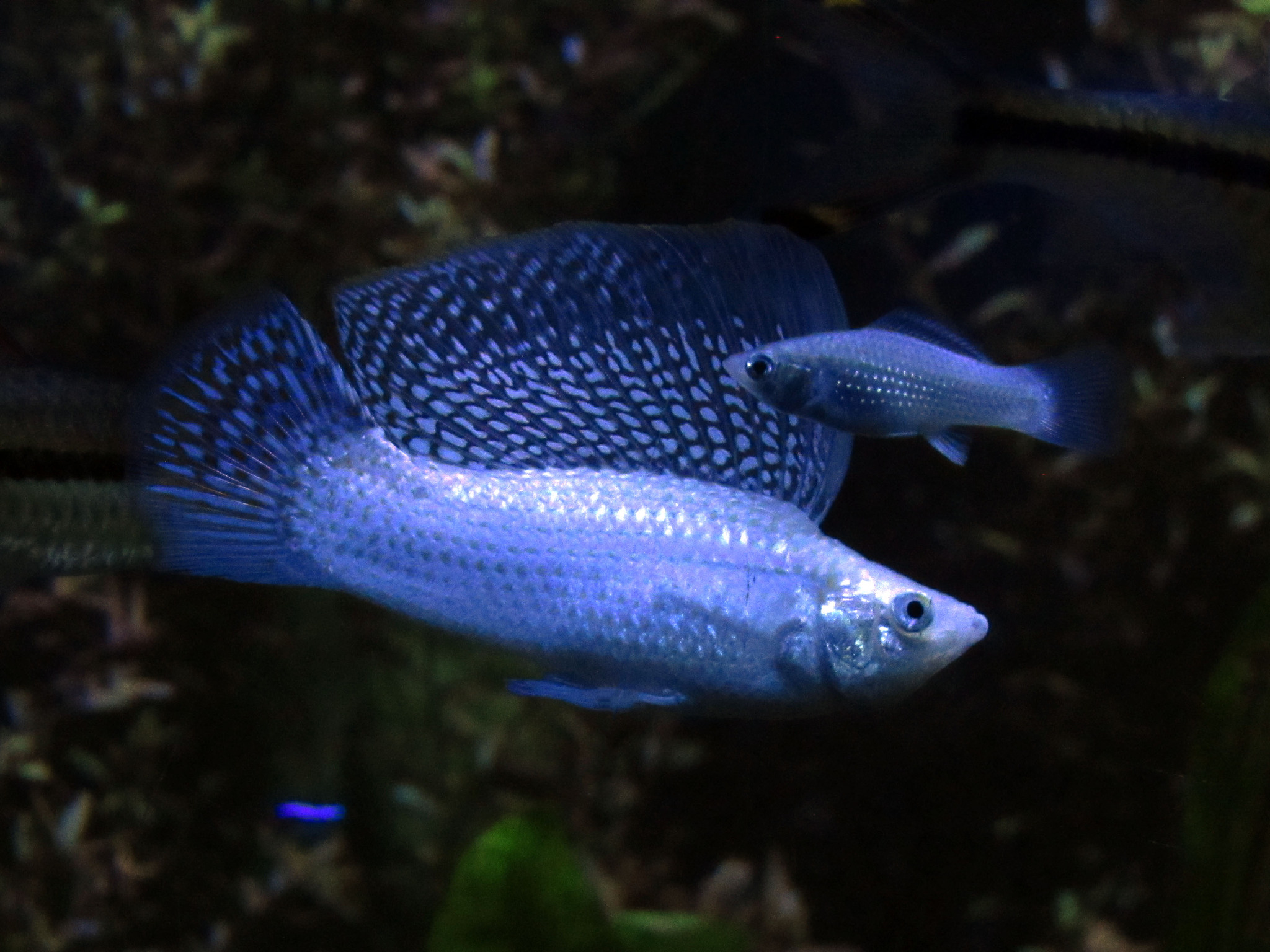
Selectively bred colour morph

The body is generally light grey, although breeding males may be greenish-blue. Several rows of spots occur along the sides, back, and dorsal fin. Often, these spots blend together, forming stripes. Aquarists have developed many color variations in this species (variation occurs naturally in the wild), with melanistic, leucistic, albino, and speckled forms known.

==== Sailfin and black mollies ====
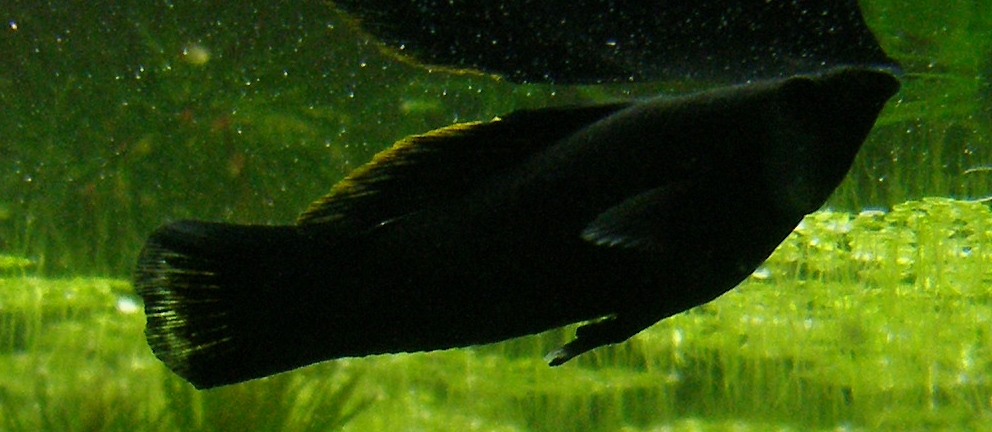
A male midnight molly

An entirely melanistic hybrid exists called the midnight molly, or "black molly". The latter originally refers to melanistic breeds of Poecilia sphenops. Midnight mollies actually originated from hybrids between that and the present species.

Hybridization, as in most Poecilia, is easy between these two species and due to the more spectacular appearance of P. latipinna, such sailfin-black molly hybrids, with males' conspicuous, large, yellow-rimmed dorsal fins, are often seen. Due to genomic recombination, F1 hybrids often display novel and bizarre fin shapes. Otherwise, hybrids can be bred among themselves, or with a higher rate of success with their parent species. They often have a decreased lifespan, but not as much (in healthy fish) as the deformed "balloon" molly breeds of P. sphenops.

=== Size, age, and growth ===
The natural lifespan of sailfin mollies is short, particularly in the case of the males, which may live less than a year after achieving sexual maturity. Depending upon environmental conditions, sailfin mollies may become reproductive in less than a year. Sailfin mollies are small fish. At one year of age, males typically range in size from 0.5 to 3 in (13 to 76 mm) SL, while mature females are likely to be 0.5 to 2.5 in (13 to 64 mm) inch SL. The size of adult males is directly correlated with population density. The greater the population, the smaller the average size of males. The maximum recorded size for this species is 150 mm (5.9 in) TL.

=== Diet ===
Sailfin mollies feed primarily upon algae and other plant materials, although they will consume a number of aquatic invertebrates, including the larvae of mosquitoes.

=== Reproduction ===
Fertilization is internal, and is accomplished by means of highly modified fin elements within the anal fin of males that form a structure known as the gonopodium. Sailfin mollies produce broods of 10–140 live young, depending on maturity and size, and females may store sperm long after the demise of their relatively short-lived mates. The gestation period for this species is about three to four weeks, depending upon temperature, and a single female may give birth on multiple occasions throughout the year. Although sex ratios of the broods are balanced, adult populations tend to be largely female, as males appear to suffer higher rates of mortality due to a greater susceptibility to predators and disease as a consequence of their brighter colors and a life devoted to frenzied breeding. No parental care is exhibited by this species.

== Importance to humans ==
The sailfin molly is of considerable interest and value to aquarists, and many artificially selected varieties are produced and sold in pet shops. Wild sailfin mollies are also bred as feeder fish for larger carnivorous fish, though usually guppies are used for that. Naturally occurring populations control mosquito populations by feeding on the larvae and pupae of these pests.

== Conservation ==
This species is listed as "Least Concern" by the International Union for Conservation of Nature (IUCN).
