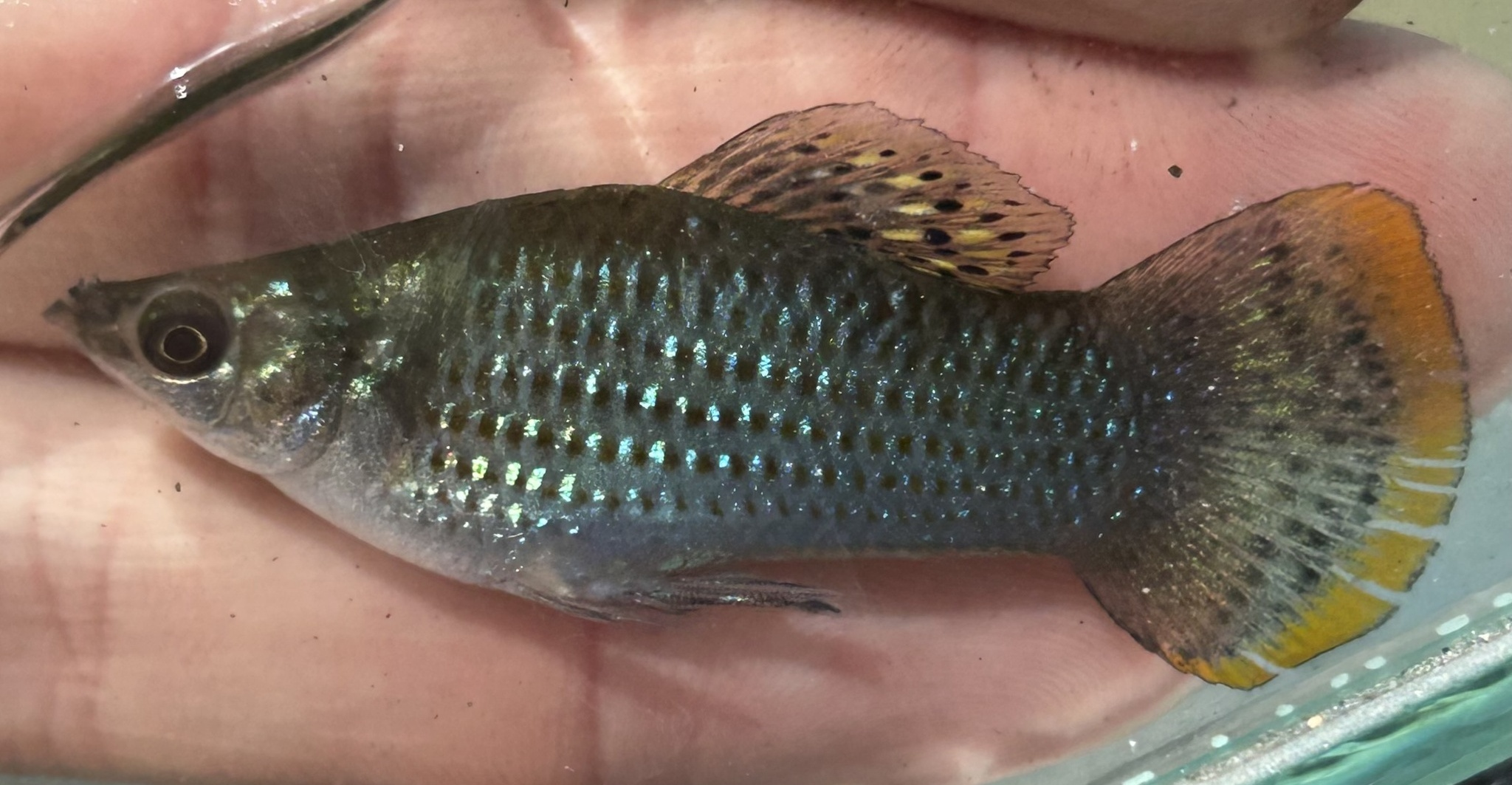
- Male
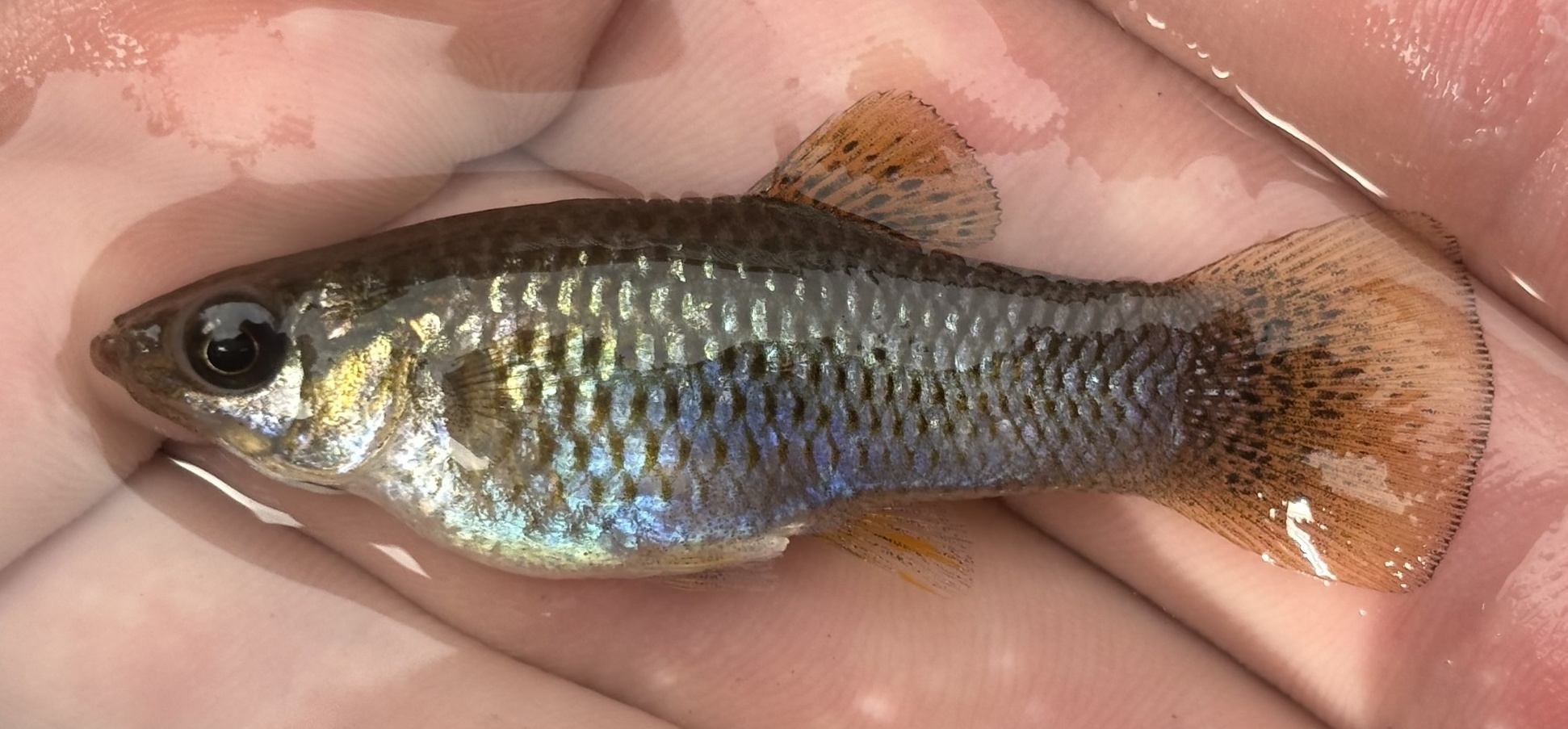
- Female

Conservation status
- Least Concern (IUCN 3.1)

Scientific classification
- Kingdom: Animalia
- Phylum: Chordata
- Class: Actinopterygii
- Order: Cyprinodontiformes
- Family: Poeciliidae
- Genus: Poecilia
- Species: P. sphenops

Binomial name
- Poecilia sphenops (Valenciennes, 1846)

Synonyms
- Synonymy: Mollienisia sphenops (Valenciennes, 1846); Poecilia thermalis Steindachner, 1863; Gambusia modesta Troschel, 1865; Gambusia plumbea Troschel, 1865; Poecilia chisoyensis Günther, 1866; Poecilia dovii Günther, 1866; Poecilia spilurus Günther, 1866; Platypoecilus mentalis Gill, 1877; Poecilia boucardii Steindachner, 1878; Platypoecilus nelsoni Meek, 1904; Platypoecilus tropicus Meek, 1907; Poecilia tenuis Meek, 1907; Poecilia spilonota Regan, 1908; Poecilia caudata Meek, 1909; Mollienesia macrura Hubbs, 1935; Mollienesia vantynei Hubbs, 1935; Mollienesia altissima Hubbs, 1936; Mollienesia pallida de Buen, 1943; Lembesseia parvianalis Fowler, 1949

= Poecilia sphenops =

Molly

Species of livebearer fish

Poecilia sphenops, called the Mexican molly or simply the molly, is a species of poeciliid fish from Central America. It was once understood as a widespread species with numerous local variants ranging from Mexico to Venezuela, but these variants are today considered distinct species belonging to the P. sphenops complex and P. sphenops itself as being native to Mexico, Guatemala, and Honduras. Due in part to its popularity as an aquarium fish, the species has been introduced outside of its native range, but many records may in fact refer to P. mexicana or other species from the complex. P. sphenops has been crossbred with other mollies, notably P. latipinna and P. velifera, to produce fancy mollies for the ornamental fish trade.

== Taxonomy ==
P. sphenops is placed in the subgenus Mollienesia (mollies) according to the prevailing taxonomic classification of species within the genus Poecilia, and more precisely within the shortfin molly clade, so named because they have a shorter dorsal fin than the sailfin mollies.

All shortfin mollies were once considered local variants of a highly polytypic P. sphenops species distributed from the Río Grande basin in north-eastern Mexico to the coast of Venezuela, but currently prevailing view is that the shortfin mollies constitute the P. sphenops species complex of around 13 distinct species. The P. sphenops complex is sometimes further divided into a P. sphenops complex comprising species from the Pacific slope and a P. mexicana complex from the Atlantic slope. P. sphenops is frequently confused with P. mexicana; the two species, as well as the respective complexes, differ in the shape of their inner jaw teeth, which are tricuspid in P. sphenops and unicuspid in P. mexicana.

== Description ==
P. sphenops can grow to 8.4 cm (3.3 in) standard length or 10 cm (3.9 in) total length, but is usually smaller. The species is dimorphic, with females growing around 1 cm (0.39 in) larger than males. Males, which are the more intensely colored sex, grow little or not at all after their gonopodium fully develops.

== Distribution and habitat ==
P. sphenops occurs in both the Atlantic and Pacific slope of Mexico and the northern parts of Central America. On the Atlantic side it ranges from the Palma Sola River in the north to the basin of the Coatzacoalcos River and the headwaters of the Grijalva River in the south. On the Pacific slope it is distributed from the middle of the Río Verde basin in the state of Oaxaca to western Honduras and northern Guatemala. P. sphenops frequently occurs together with P. mexicana, but in short coastal streams the former tends to occupy upstream and the latter downstream habitats.

P. sphenops has been introduced outside of its native range through escapes and intentional releases by aquarists and fish farms. It is considered naturalized in the US states of Montana and Nevada as well as in Puerto Rico and reported from California and Arizona, but some or all of these populations may turn out to represent another species of the P. sphenops complex. Conversely, introductions attributed to P. mexicana may represent P. sphenops. Once established in an area, the species tends to disperse and colonize new sites without human intervention.

P. sphenops inhabits freshwater and brackish habitats, with typical habitats including rivers, ponds, lagoons, roadside ditches, and creeks. It is particularly widespread in creeks, and may be found in both lowlands and uplands. It occurs in stagnant water as well as in waters with slight and moderate flow. Such waters may be clear, turbid, or muddy, and are typically not deeper than 1 m (3 ft 3 in). The habitats may feature substrates of marl, clay, silt, mud (which is often deep), rock or bedrock. Some of the habitats are devoid of vegetation, while in others algae (e.g. Chara) and plants such as Lemna, Nasturtium, fine-leaved Potamogeton, Sagittaria, and Typha species are abundant. P. sphenops survives in temperatures ranging from 10.8–11.8°C to 38.8–39.5°C when acclimated in a range of 20–35°C.

== Diet ==
P. sphenops is highly adaptable in terms of diet, utlizing a variety of food sources in different habitats. Algae and diatoms form a significant part of the diet. Different populations of the species have been recorded browsing on filamentous algae, filtering phytoplankton, rotifers, and crustaceans, preying on protozoa and insect larvae, or feeding chiefly on detritus. Because of their larger size, females can feed on a wider array of prey than males. In the aquarium the species browses on green algae and readily accepts dried food.

== Reproduction ==
P. sphenops is a livebearer, producing up to 150 young after a month-long gestation. Young fish have been captured from January to August, indicating that the species reproduces throughout much of the year. In rivers the adults congregate close to the banks, while the fry stay in very shallow water. As with other members of its species complex, P. sphenops does not exhibit courtship display; instead, males sneak up to females and force copulation.

Males do not live long after reaching sexual maturity. As in other poeciliids, populations tend to contain more females than males. Males are more susceptible to stress and metabolic aging, less resistant to adverse environmental conditions, and predated on more easily due to their smaller size and more conspicuous colors.

== Commercial value ==
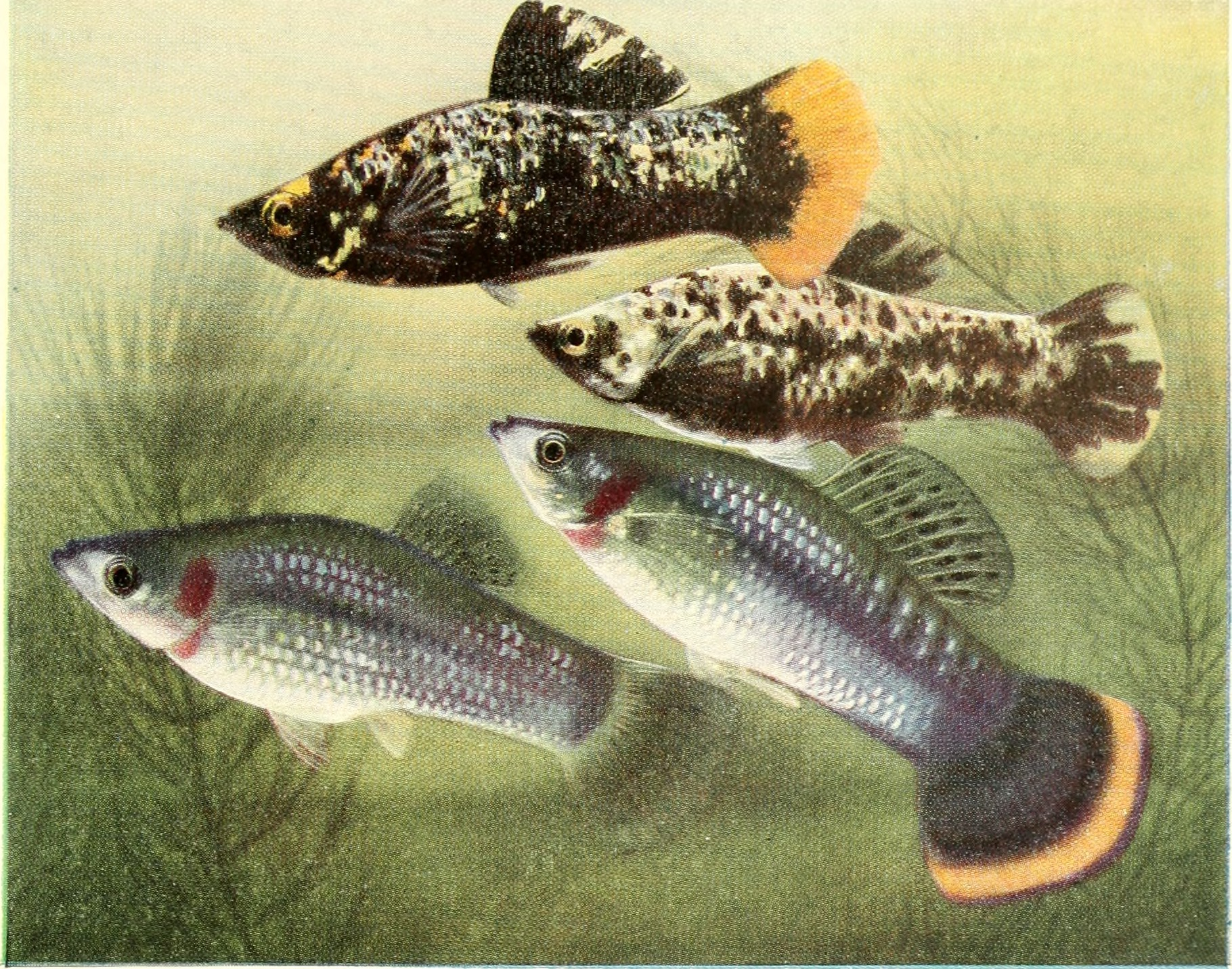
A 1936 illustration of "Mollienisia sphenops" and the early fancy mollies

Fish marketed as Poecilia sphenops are among the most popular subjects in ornamental fish trade worldwide. The black molly is commonly defined in aquarium literature as a black breeding form of P. sphenops, but black mollies comprise fish with different pedigrees. Ichthyologist Eugene K. Balon attributed the origin of the black molly to the crossbreeding of P. sphenops with the sailfin P. latipinna. The exact origin of the fancy mollies remains disputed.

The commercial value of Poecilia sphenops in the fisheries of Mexico is very low. The fish are exploited in artisanal fisheries for human consumption in parts of the state of Oaxaca, and are suitable for aquaculture because of their thermal adaptability.
