= Livebearers =

Fish that give birth to free swimming offspring

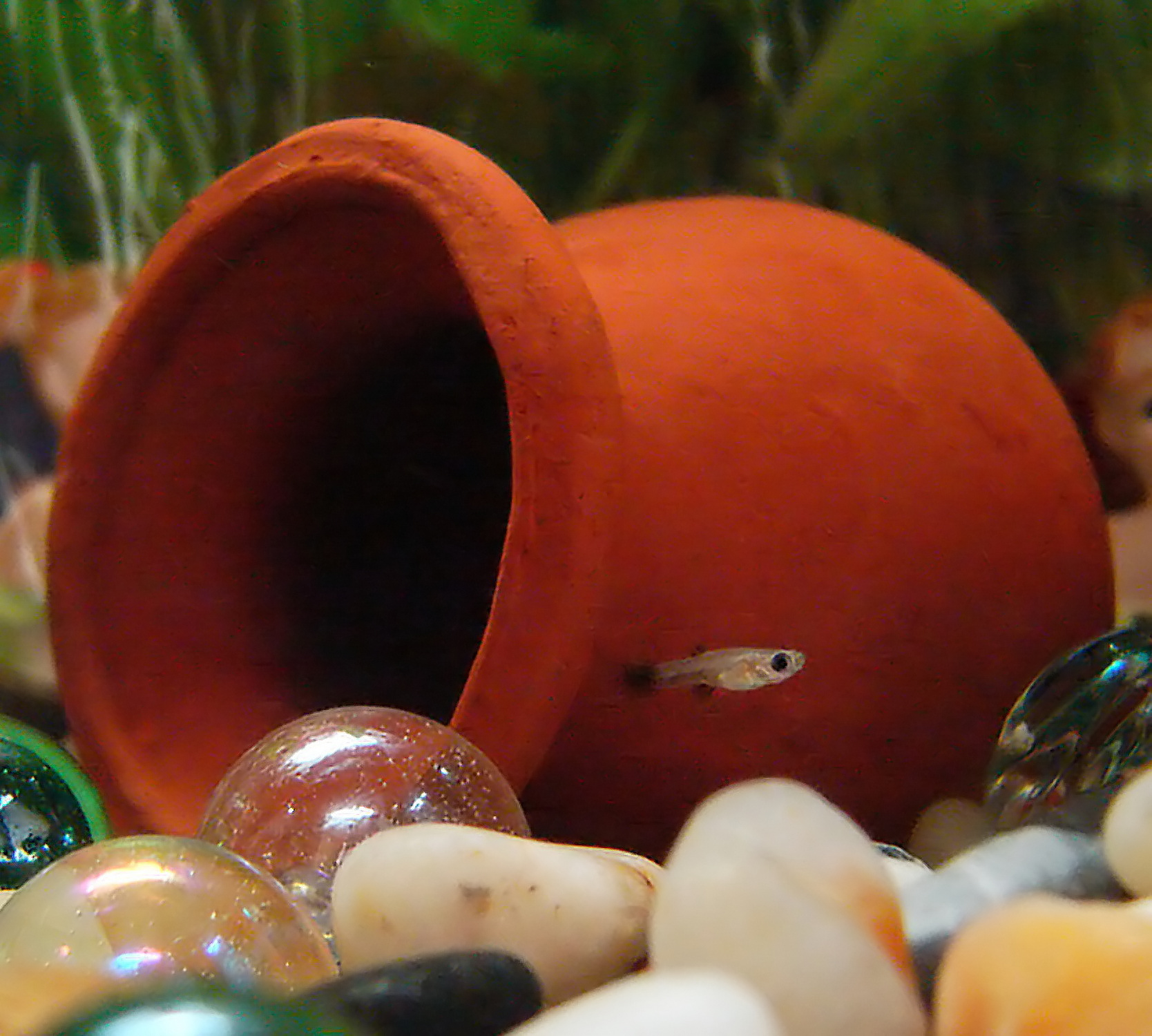
Guppy fry 1 week old

Livebearers are fish that retain their eggs inside the body and give birth to live, free-swimming young, a process known as frying. They are especially prized by aquarium owners. Among aquarium fish, livebearers are nearly all members of the family Poeciliidae and include: guppy, molly, platy, endler’s and swordtails.

The advantages of livebearing to the aquarist are that the newborn juvenile fish are larger than newly-hatched fry, have a lower chance of mortality and are easier to care for. Unusual livebearers include seahorses and pipefish, where the males care for the young, and certain cichlids that are mouthbrooders, with the parent incubating the eggs in the buccal cavity.

== Common aquarium livebearers ==
Species of interest to aquarists are almost always members of the family Poeciliidae, most commonly guppies, mollies, platies, swordtails, Endler's livebearer, and mosquitofish. Most of these are ovoviviparous, with the developing embryos receiving no nourishment from the parent fish, but a few are viviparous, receiving food from the maternal blood supply.

Because the newborn fish are large compared to the fry of oviparous fish, which are those that lay eggs, newborn fish of livebearers are easier to feed than the fry of egg-laying species, such as characins and cichlids. This makes them much easier to raise, and for this reason, aquarists often recommend them for beginning fish breeder hobbyists. The larger livebearer fry makes them far less vulnerable to predation, as the parents often eat fry if hungry. With the sufficient cover in the way of plants or porous objects, they can sometimes mature in a community tank.

== Ovoviviparous and viviparous fish compared ==
Most of the Poeciliidae are ovoviviparous, that is, while the eggs are retained inside the body of the female for protection, the eggs are essentially independent of the mother and she does not provide them with any nutrients. In contrast, fish such as splitfins and halfbeaks are viviparous, with the eggs receiving food from the maternal blood supply through structures analogous to the placenta of placental mammals.

== Aberrant livebearers and mouthbrooders ==
Seahorses and pipefish can be defined as livebearers, although in these cases the males incubate the eggs rather than the females. In many cases, the eggs are dependent on the male for oxygen and nutrition so these fish can be further defined as viviparous livebearers.

Many cichlids are mouthbrooders, with the female (or more rarely the male) incubating the eggs in the mouth. Compared with other cichlids, these species produce fewer but bigger eggs, and when they emerge, the fry is better developed and has higher survivability. Because the eggs are protected from the environment but do not absorb nutrients from the parent, this condition is analogous to, though not identical with, ovoviviparity.

== Livebearer fish gallery ==
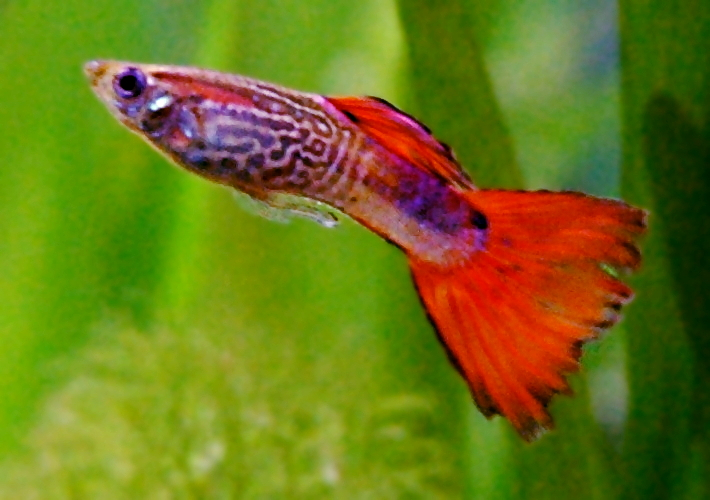

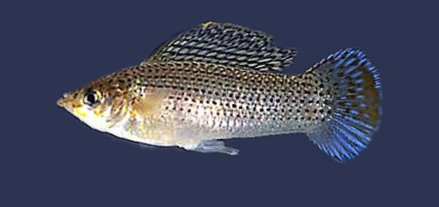

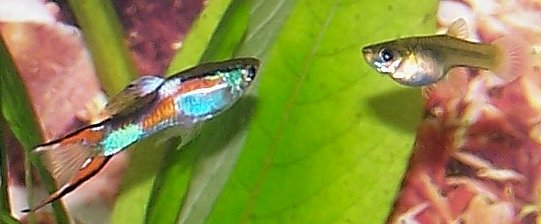

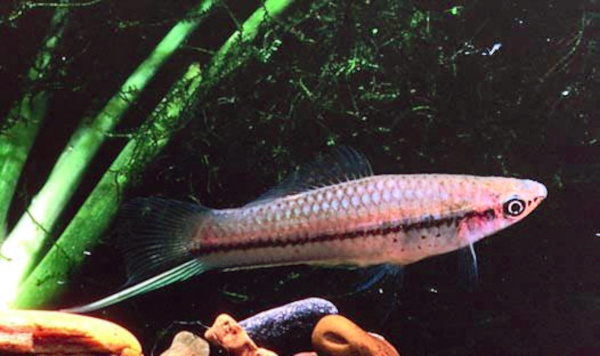

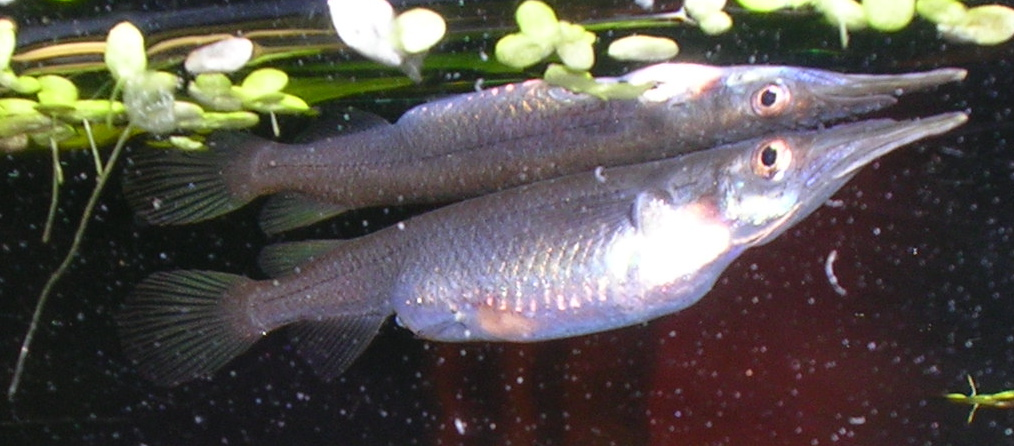
