= Pánuco River =

River in Mexico

Pánuco River Río de Canoas
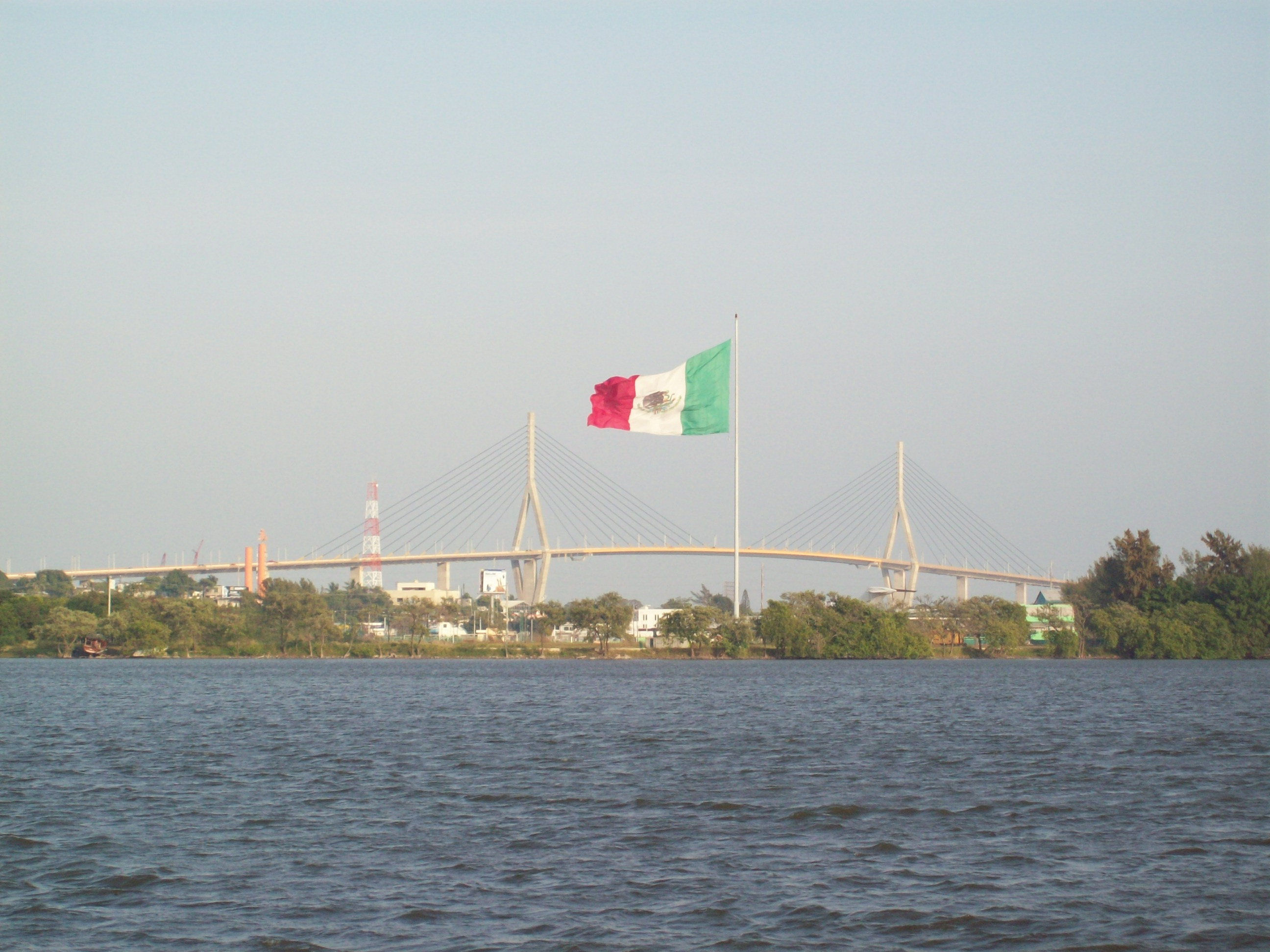
- Tampico Bridge over Pánuco River

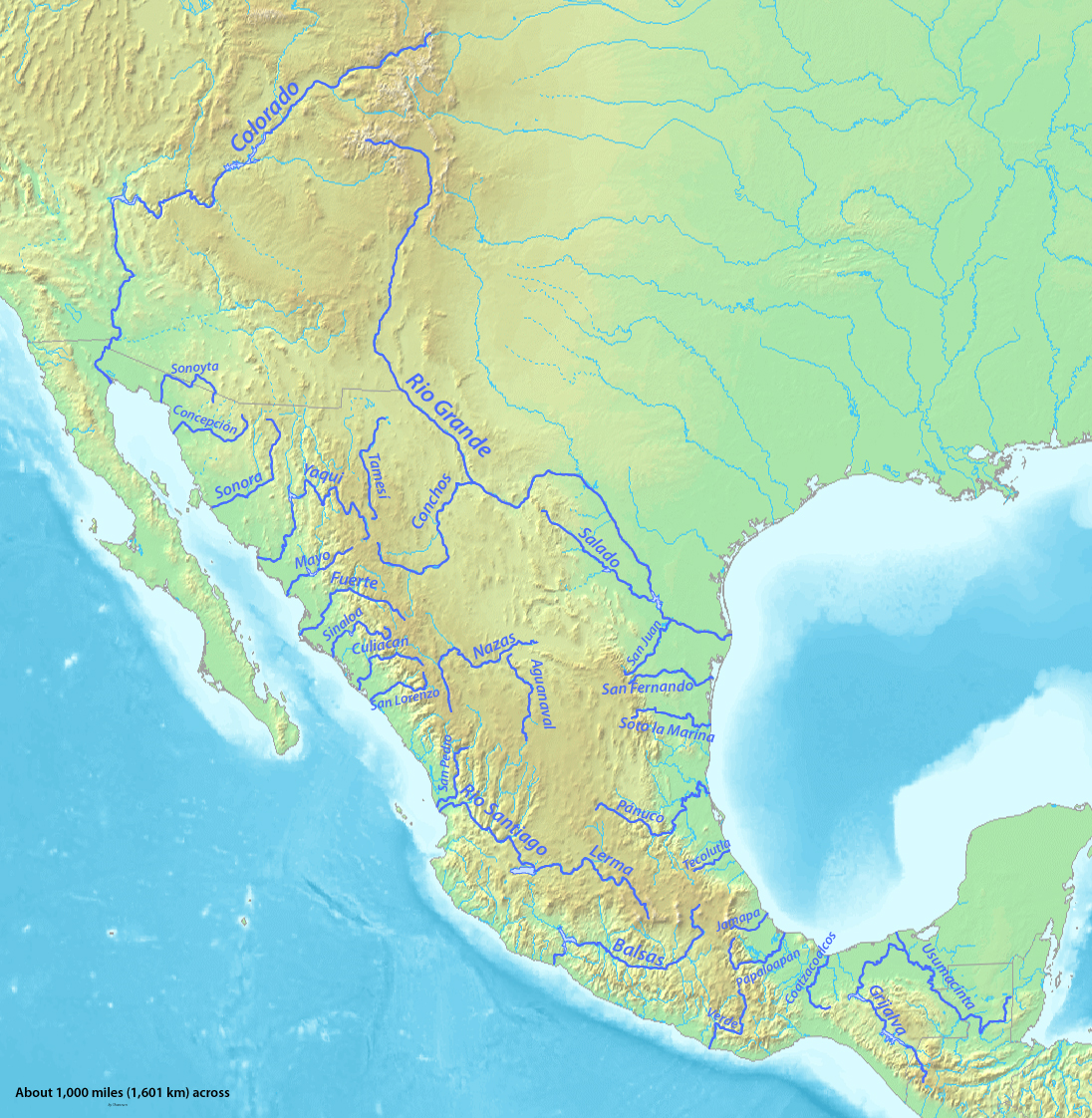
- Major rivers of Mexico, with Pánuco near the center

- Location of mouth
- Native name: Río Pánuco (Spanish)

Location
- Country: Mexico
- States: Mexico; Hidalgo; Querétaro; San Luis Potosí; Tamaulipas; Veracruz

Physical characteristics
- Source
  - location: Confluence of Moctezuma and Tampaón Rivers
  - coordinates: 21°58′05″N 98°33′48″W
  - elevation: 3,800 metres (12,500 ft)
- Mouth
  - location: Gulf of Mexico at Ciudad Madero
  - coordinates: 22°16′00″N 97°47′00″W
  - elevation: 0 m (0 ft)
- Length: 510 kilometres (320 mi)
- Basin size: 84,956 square kilometres (32,802 sq mi)
- Discharge
  - location: Las Adjuntas
  - average: 481 cubic metres per second (17,000 cu ft/s)

The Pánuco River (Spanish: Río Pánuco, Spanish pronunciation: [ˈpanuko]), also known as the Río de Canoas, is a river in Mexico fed by several tributaries including the Moctezuma River and emptying into the Gulf of Mexico. The river is approximately 510 kilometres (320 mi) long and passes through or borders the states of Mexico, Hidalgo, Querétaro, San Luis Potosí, Tamaulipas, and Veracruz. According to the Atlas of Mexico, it is the fourth-largest river in Mexico by volume of runoff, and forms the sixth-largest river basin in Mexico by area.

== Description ==
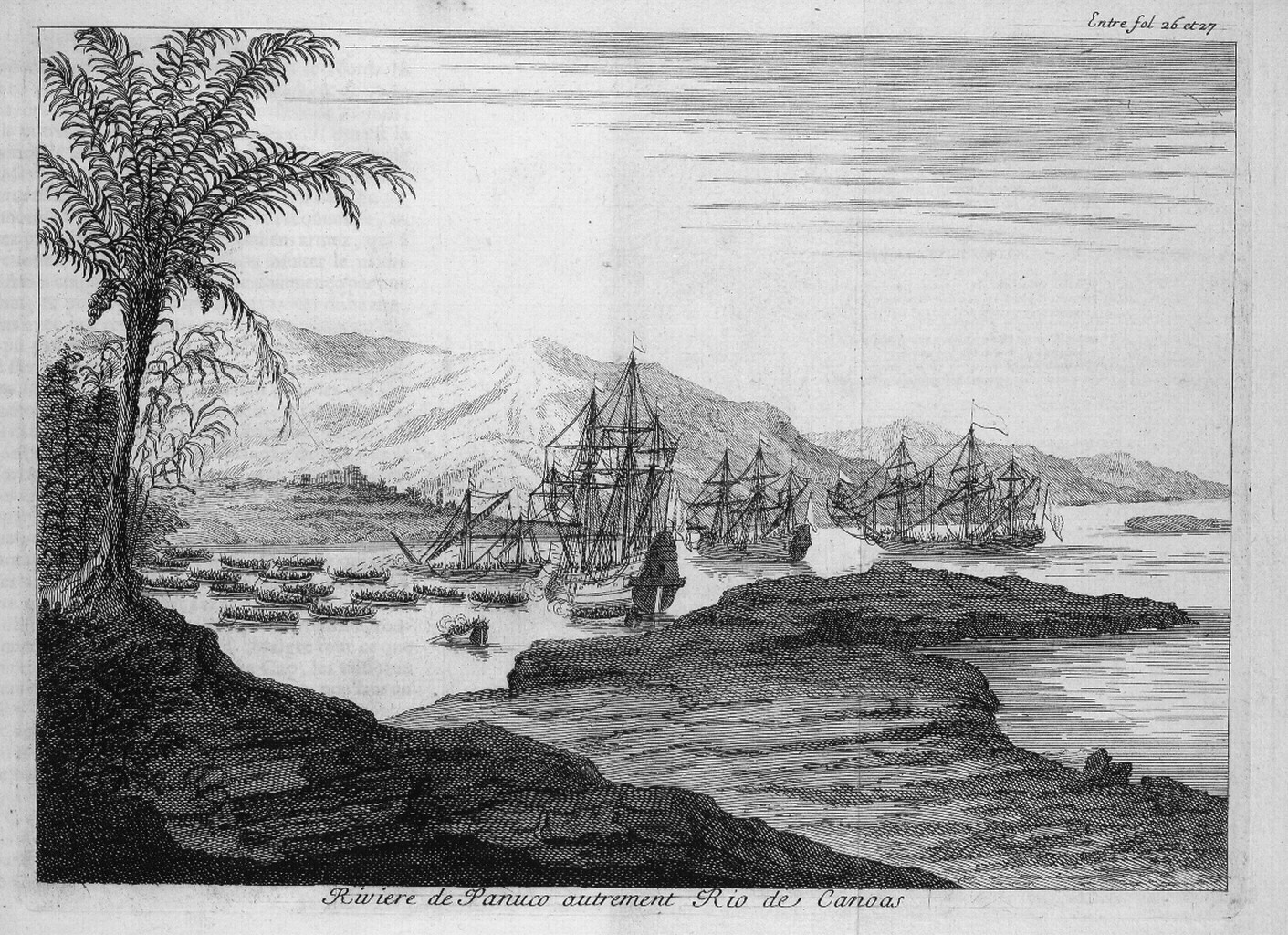
Pánuco River, a.k.a. Río de Canoas. Copper-plate engraving from Dutch artist Jan Karel Donatus van Beecq.

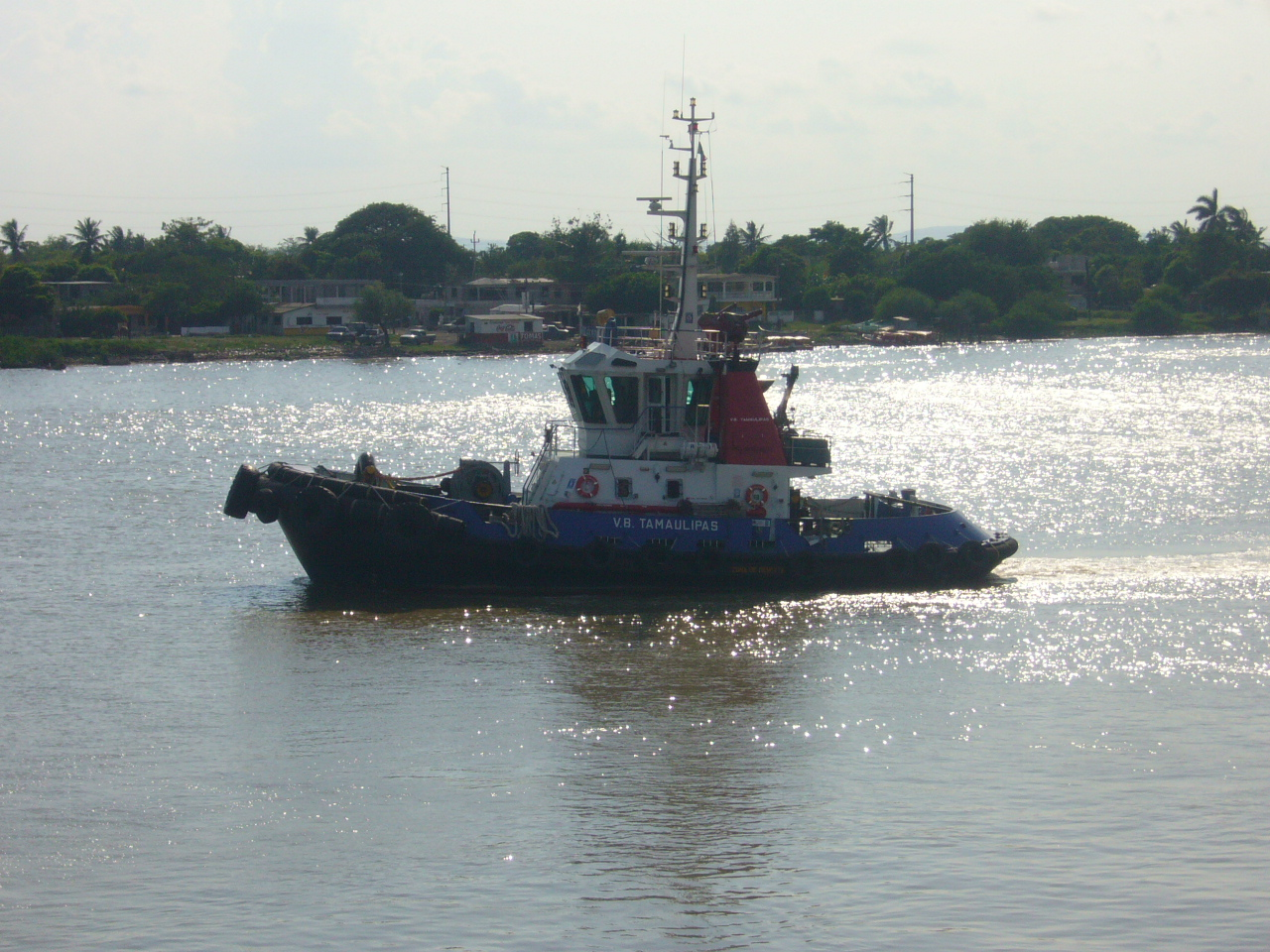
Boat on Pánuco River at Tampico

The Pánuco River drains a basin of 98,227 km^{2}, which includes portions of the Mexican Plateau, the Sierra Madre Oriental, and the Gulf Coastal Plain.

The Pánuco is formed by the confluence of its two main tributaries, the Moctezuma and the Tampaón (or Tamuín).

The Moctezuma originates on the Mexican Plateau, and its headwater streams include the Tula River. It runs northward, forming the state border between Hidalgo and Querétaro as it moves toward San Luis Potosí, before turning eastward to carve a deep canyon through the Sierra Madre Oriental. Once emerging onto the Gulf Coastal Plain, it runs northeastwards, joined from the south by the Tempoal River before joining the Tamuin in Veracruz.

The Santa Maria and Rio Verde also originate on the Mexican Plateau, north of the Moctezuma. They carve canyons through the Sierra, where they join to form the Tampaón, which continues eastwards past the Sierra onto the Gulf Coastal Plain to join the Moctezuma.

The Pánuco winds another 172.5 km through the coastal lowlands, joined from the south by the Topila and from the north by the Tamesí, before emptying into the Gulf of Mexico at Tampico–Ciudad Madero, Tamaulipas. The lower Pánuco forms the border between the states of Tamaulipas and Veracruz. The Tampico Bridge crosses the river near its mouth.

In total, the Pánuco is more than 500 km in length, though only the last 15 km is navigable for larger ships. The watershed of the Pánuco and its tributaries drains portions of Tamaulipas, San Luis Potosí, Guanajuato, Querétaro, Hidalgo, Mexico, Puebla, and Veracruz.

In 1519, during his cartographic expeditions along the western coast of the Gulf of Mexico, Spanish explorer Alonso Álvarez de Pineda established a settlement on the river, which he named Las Palmas, though it was abandoned after he was killed in battle with indigenous peoples living nearby.

== Climate ==
The Pánuco basin has a subtropical climate. The climate east of the Sierra ranges from semi-arid in the north and subhumid in the south, with average annual rainfall ranging from 800 mm in drier north up to 3000 mm in the south. The eastward-facing slopes of the Sierra generate orographic precipitation. The Mexican Plateau is in the rain shadow of the Sierra Madre Oriental, and has an arid to semi-arid climate, with an average annual rainfall of 300 mm.

The principal source of rainfall is easterly trade winds, which strengthen from late June to August. Tropical cyclonic storms can bring additional moisture from August through October. August is generally the highest rainfall month. Rainfall is generally low from November to mid-June, except for occasional mid-latitude storms coming from the north during the winter months.

The volume of water carried by the river is highest during late summer and early fall, and is generally low from November through June.

== Ecology ==
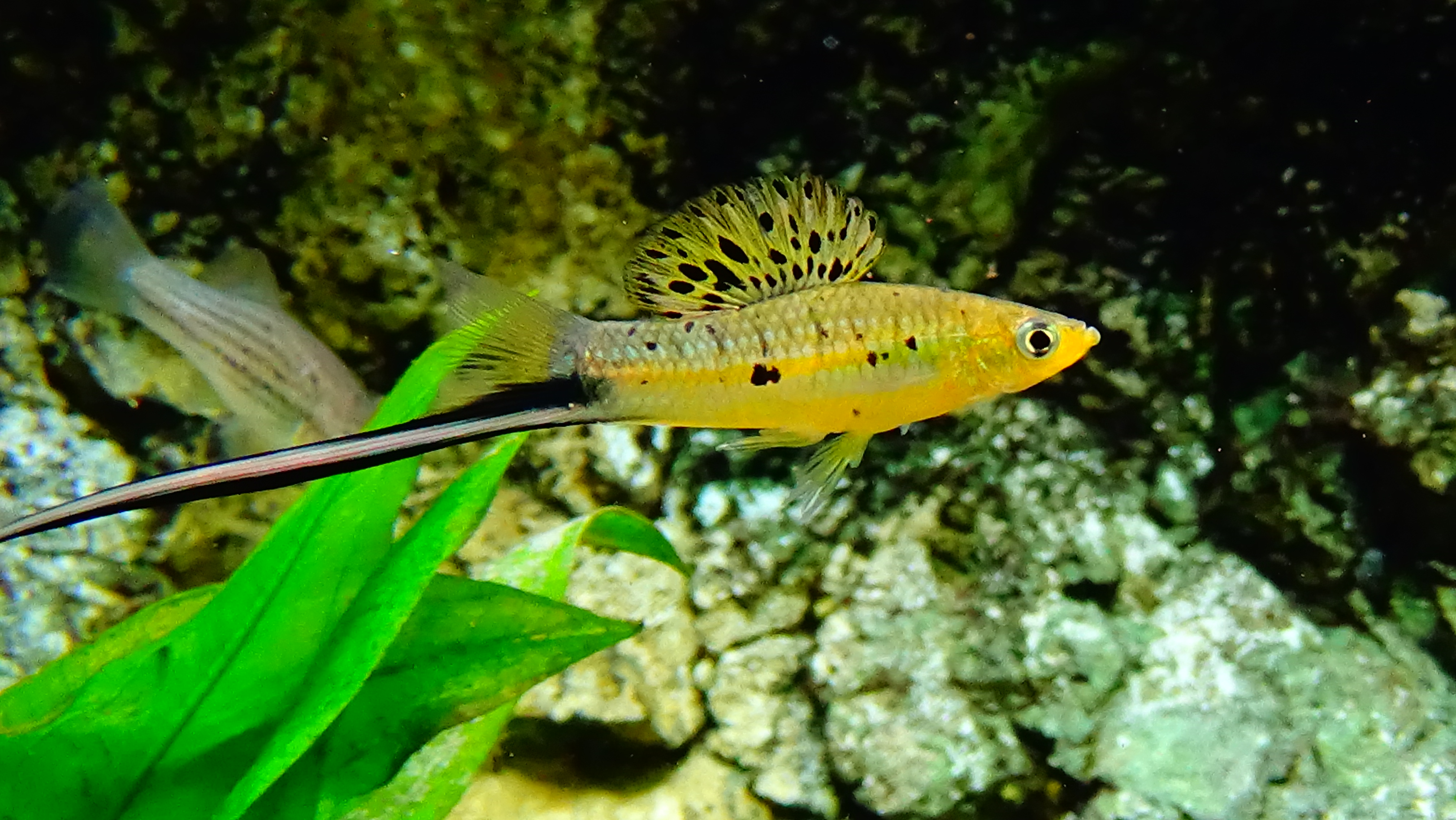
The Montezuma swordtail is one of nine species of swordtail found only in the Pánuco River basin

The Pánuco River basin is rich in fish. There are almost 100 fish species, including a few that were introduced. There are many endemics: six Nosferatu cichlid species, five Tampichthys minnows, nine "northern swordtails" (genus Xiphophorus), three Gambusia species, two Ictalurus catfish, the bluetail goodeid (Ataeniobius toweri), dusky splitfin (Goodea gracilis), relict splitfin (Xenoophorus captivus), pygmy shiner (Notropis tropicus), checkered pupfish (Cualac tessellatus), broadspotted molly (Poecilia latipunctata), Tamasopo cichlid (Herichthys tamasopoensis), Calabazas shiner (Notropis calabazas) and fleshylip buffalo (Ictiobus labiosus). Additionally, a couple of still-undescribed species are known from this river basin. A few of the endemics are seriously threatened.

== See also ==
- Tampico Bridge
- List of longest rivers of Mexico

== Sources and external links ==
- "Panuco", Freshwater Ecoregions of the World
- "Tales of Southern Rivers", by Zane Grey, 1924, True story of descent of Santa Rosa and Panuco Rivers
