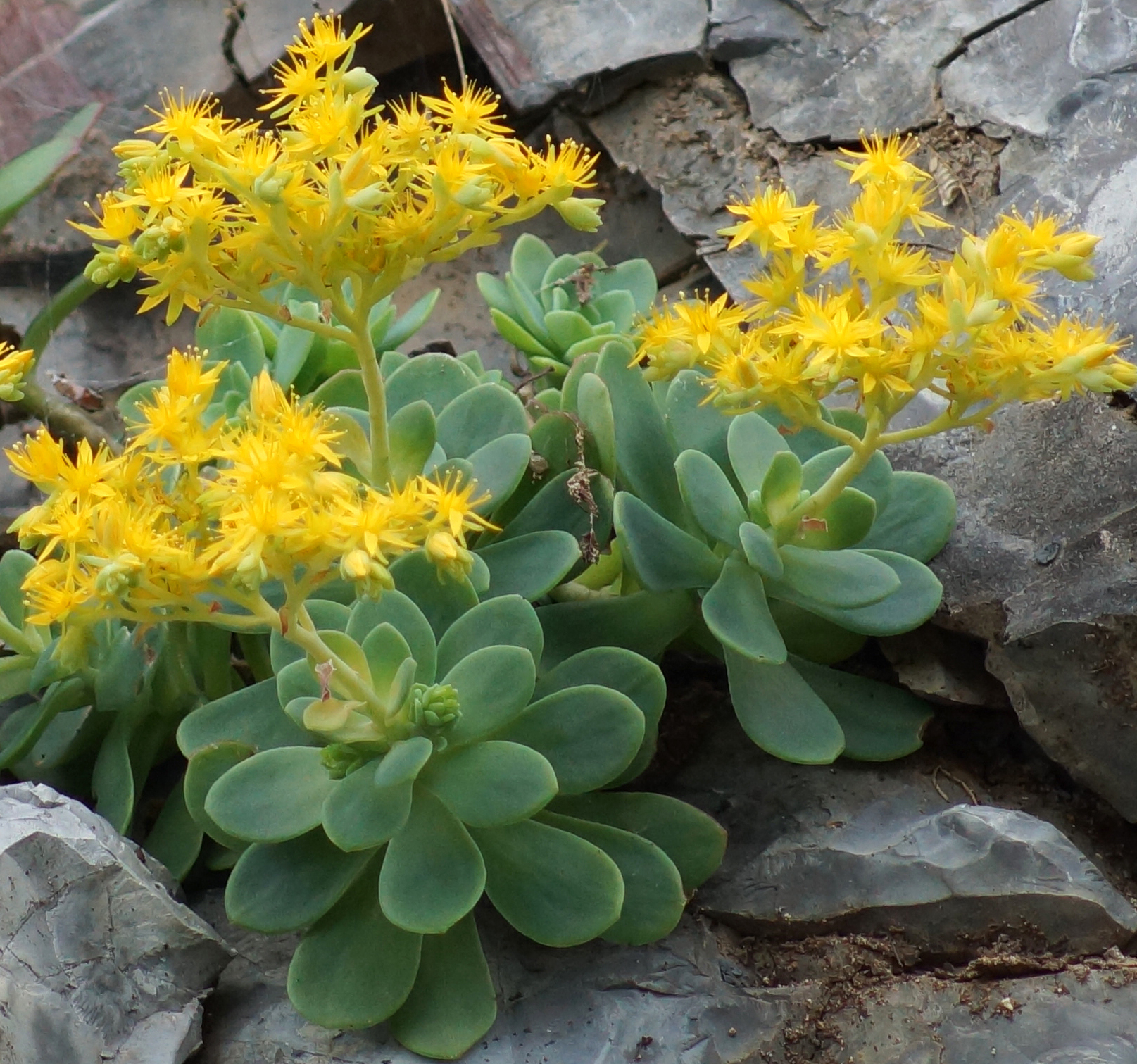

Scientific classification
- Kingdom: Plantae
- Clade: Embryophytes
- Clade: Tracheophytes
- Clade: Angiosperms
- Clade: Eudicots
- Order: Saxifragales
- Family: Crassulaceae
- Genus: Sedum
- Species: S. palmeri

Binomial name
- Sedum palmeri S.Watson

= Sedum palmeri =

Species of flowering plant of the stonecrop family

Sedum palmeri is a species of stonecrop from Mexico. It is a highly variable species with multiple branching stems and rosettes of thick, spoon-shaped, grey-green leaves with pointed tips. It is widely grown as an ornamental plant, especially in the Mediterranean region.

== Distribution ==
Sedum palmeri typically grows in the northeastern region of Mexico, particularly in the Sierra Madre Oriental, north of the Guayalejo River, spanning areas of Tamaulipas, Nuevo León, and Coahuila. It is naturalized in Italy.

== Taxonomy ==
Sedum palmeri is named after the English-born U.S. plant collector Edward Palmer. Chromosome counts have been recorded as 2n = 68, 70, and 136. The diploid form is now uncommon in cultivation. The more prevalent tetraploid form (with four sets of chromosomes), previously designated as S. compressum, is the dominant type found today.

Sedum palmeri is a highly variable species. Two subspecies have been posited: S. palmeri subsp. emarginatum and S. palmeri subsp. rubromarginatum, but are not universally recognized. Their purported distinguishing traits have been found to be inconstant within populations and even in individual plants, which suggests that they are an example of phenotypic plasticity rather than taxonomic traits.

== Description ==
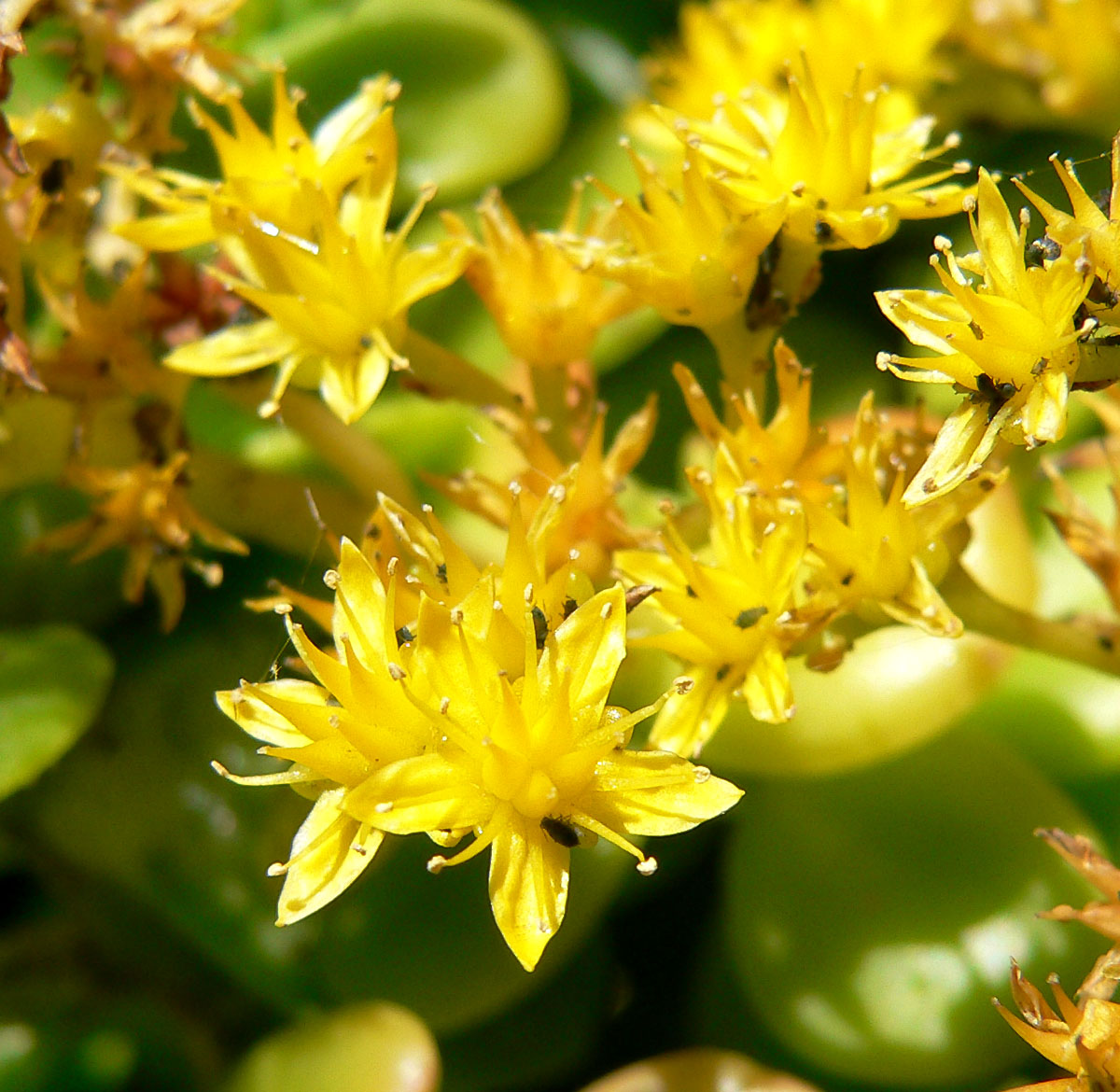
Sedum palmeri produces clusters of flowers.

Sedum palmeri is a smooth, perennial subshrub with multiple slender, bending stems that grow between 15 and 25 cm (5.9 and 9.8 in) tall. Its leaves are light green, alternately arranged and vary in shape, from narrowly spoon-shaped to broadly obovate. Those near the base are obovate with a false petiole, while all are rounded at the tip, either smooth or finely textured with small bumps, and covered in a bluish waxy coating. They range from 10 to 30 mm in length.

The flowering branches of Sedum palmeri stand upright, bearing loosely arranged clusters of flowers in either panicle or corymb-like formations. The small bracts are somewhat oval. Each flower has five to seven segments and is attached by a stalk. The sepals are broad at the base, unequal in size, and oblong with slightly pointed tips, measuring 4 to 5.5 mm. The petals are partly fused at the base, oblong, slightly rounded at the tip, and broadly pointed, with a striking orange-yellow hue, reaching 6 to 7 mm in length. The nectar scales are wider than they are long and nearly flat. The styles are relatively long, and the fruiting bodies stand somewhat upright.

== Cultivation ==
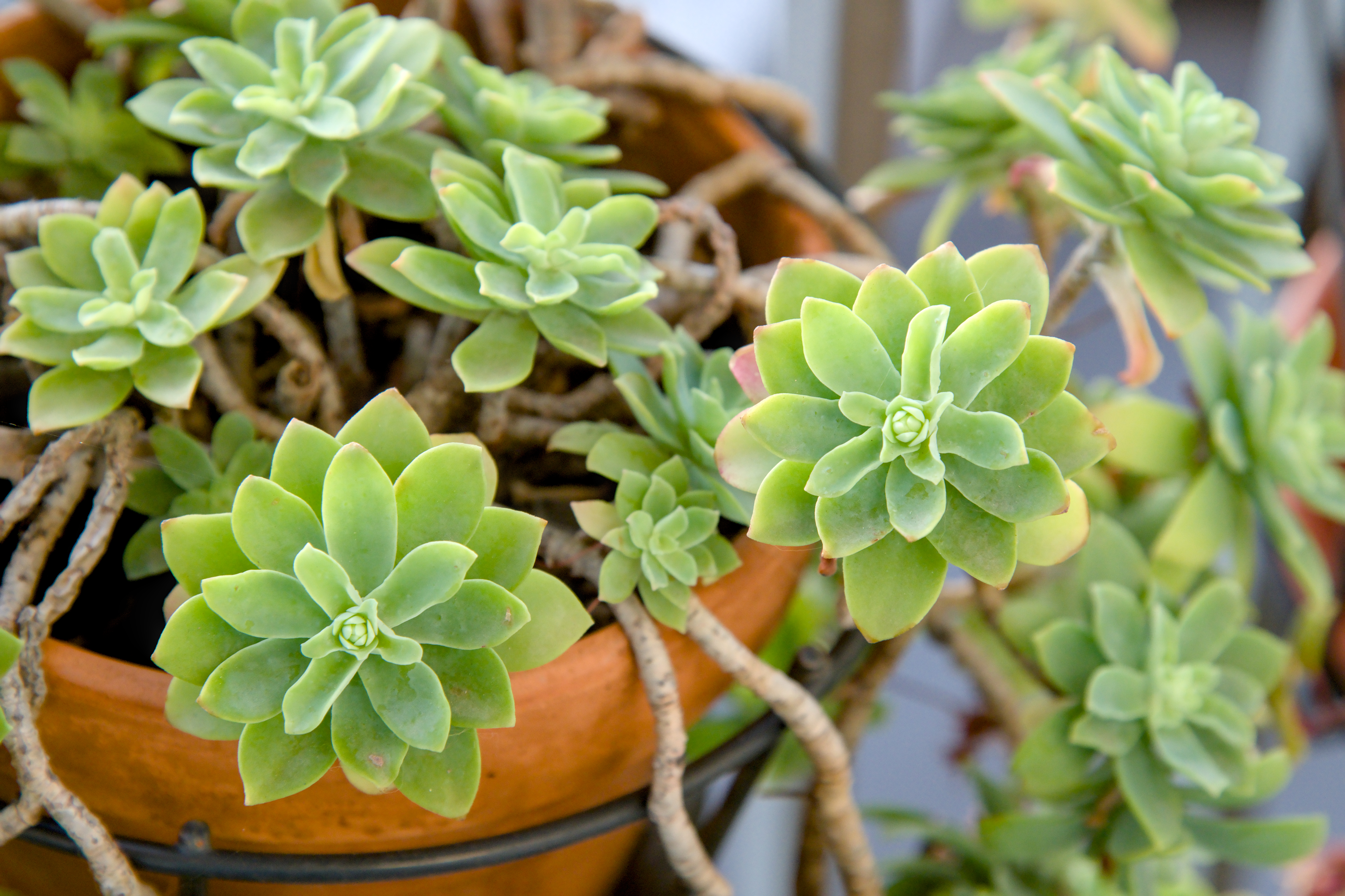
Sedum palmeri is a common sight on windowsills in Mediterranean Europe.

Sedum palmeri is well-suited for cultivation in cool climates, as it tolerates low temperatures if kept dry. It thrives in hanging baskets, where its spreading habit and trailing flower stalks are showcased. Hardy to an extent, it is suitable for window boxes, stone troughs, and terracotta containers. However, it is less tolerant of wet conditions than Sedum oaxacatum, a species with similar growth habits. While it can be grown outdoors in milder regions, it performs best in a conservatory or a sheltered porch where protection from excessive moisture is ensured.

Sedum palmeri is widely cultivated on windowsills in the Mediterranean region, particularly in Portugal, Spain, Italy, Greece, and various Mediterranean islands. The species propagates readily from cuttings, contributing to its widespread presence in Mediterranean towns and villages, where people frequently share it with friends and neighbors.
