= IFFO1 =

Protein-coding gene in the species Homo sapiens

Identifiers
- Aliases: IFFO1, HOM-TES-103, IFFO, intermediate filament family orphan 1
- External IDs: OMIM: 610495; MGI: 2444516; GeneCards: IFFO1

Gene location (Human)
Chr.	Chromosome 12 (human)
Band	12p13.31	Start	6,538,961 bp
Band	12p13.31	End	6,556,073 bp

Gene location (Mouse)
Chr.	Chromosome 6 (mouse)
Band	6|6 F2	Start	125,145,241 bp
Band	6|6 F2	End	125,161,782 bp
RNA expression pattern
Bgee	Human / Mouse (ortholog); Top expressed in: tendon of biceps brachii; granulocyte; right coronary artery; apex of heart; right hemisphere of cerebellum; spleen; Descending thoracic aorta; right frontal lobe; ascending aorta; body of uterus / Top expressed in: neural layer of retina; spermatocyte; superior frontal gyrus; cerebellar cortex; primary visual cortex; granulocyte; dentate gyrus of hippocampal formation granule cell; seminiferous tubule; facial motor nucleus; internal carotid artery; More reference expression data
BioGPS	n/a
Orthologs
Databases	NCBI: entry; OMA: entry
Species	Human	Mouse
Entrez	25900	320678
Ensembl	ENSG00000010295	ENSMUSG00000038271
UniProt	Q0D2I5	Q8BXL9
RefSeq (mRNA)	NM_001039670; NM_001193457; NM_001193459; NM_015438; NM_080730 NM_080731; NM_001330324; NM_001330325	NM_001039669; NM_178787; NM_001302778; NM_001302779
RefSeq (protein)	NP_001034759; NP_001180386; NP_001317253; NP_001317254; NP_542768	NP_001034758; NP_001289707; NP_001289708; NP_848902
Location (UCSC)	Chr 12: 6.54 – 6.56 Mb	Chr 6: 125.15 – 125.16 Mb
PubMed search
- Wikidata
View/Edit Human	View/Edit Mouse

Intermediate filament family orphan 1 is a protein that in humans is encoded by the IFFO1 gene. IFFO1 has uncharacterized function and a weight of 61.98 kDa. IFFO1 proteins play an important role in the cytoskeleton and the nuclear envelope of most eukaryotic cell types.

== Gene ==
IFFO in human is located on the minus strand at Chromosome 12p13.3. The protein contains 17,709 nucleotide bases that encodes for 570 amino acids. The basal isoelectric point is 4.83. IFFO1 contains a highly conserved filament domain that spans 299 amino acids from amino residue 230 to 529. This region has been identified as pfam00038 conserved protein domain family. Due to alternative splicing, there are 7 isoforms of IFFO1 in humans with 10 typical coding exons.

IFFO1 locus on Chromosome 12p13.3

=== Aliases ===
IFFO1 is also called Intermediate Filament Family Orphan Isoform X1, Intermediate Filament Family Orphan, HOM-TES-103, Intermediate Filament-Like MGC: 2625, and Tumor Antigen HOM-TES-10.

== Homology ==
=== Orthologs ===
The gene is found to be highly conserved. The most distant orthologs are found in fish and sharks (cartilaginous fishes) such as Callorhinchus milii. Very low percentages of sequence coverage and identity of the gene's orthologs in fungi and invertebrates suggest that the gene was lost in those organisms. Therefore, it is highly probable that IFFO1 originated in vertebrates.

Genus/Species	Common name	Divergence from Human (MYA)	Length (aa)	Similarity	Identity	NCBI Accession
Homo sapiens	Human	N/A	570	100%	100%	XP_006719036.1
Mus musculus	Mouse	92.3	563	93%	95%	XP_006506337.2
Lipotes vexillifer	Baiji dolphin	94.2	573	92%	95%	XP_007469487.1
Loxodonta africana	African bush elephant	98.7	574	94%	96%	XP_003410688.1
Chrysemys picta bellii	Painted turtle	296	557	78%	84%	XP_005291351.1
Pseudopodoces humilis	Ground tit	296	531	76%	81%	XP_005523902.1
Python bivittatus	Burmese python	296	570	75%	82%	XP_007429680.1
Haliaeetus leucocephalus	Bald eagle	296	537	74%	79%	XP_010565842.1
Rana catesbeiana	American bull frog	371.2	511	25%	44%	BAB63946.1
Ambystoma mexicanum	Axolotl	371.2	372	24%	42%	AFN68290.1
Notophthalmus viridescens	Eastern newt	371.2	496	23%	45%	CAA04656.1
Danio Rerio	Zebra fish	400.1	640	62%	71%	XP_690165.5
Poecilia formosa	Amazon molly	400.1	640	57%	65%	XP_007550181.1
Callorhinchus milii	Australian ghostshark	462.5	512	62%	73%	XP_007896103.1

=== Paralogs ===
One paralog named IFFO2 has been found in humans. The paralog is found to have 99% similarity and 99% coverage when compared to IFFO1. The paralogous sequence is highly conserved, all the way back to fish and amphibians.

=== Evolution ===
Multiple sequence alignments indicated that the Proline-Rich region from amino residues 39 to 61 near the 5' end of the sequence is highly conserved in both close and distant orthologs. In addition, the filament region near the 3' end of the sequence is also highly conserved. Of the 42 conserved amino acid residues found within the IFFO1 sequence, 33 of them are found in the filament region.

When compared to fibrinogen and Cytochrome C (CYCS), IFFO1 is evolving at a moderate rate. The evolutionary history of fibrinogen demonstrates that it is a fast evolving gene, while cytochrome C has been found to be a slow evolving gene. With the most distant ortholog found to be in the Australian ghostshark, IFFO1 gene duplication took place in fish, which diverged from humans 462.5 million years ago.

== Protein ==
=== Structure ===
The predicted secondary structure of the protein consists mostly of alpha helices (47.19%) and random coils (44.74%). The building block of intermediate filaments are elongated coiled-coil dimer consisting of four consecutive alpha-helical segments.

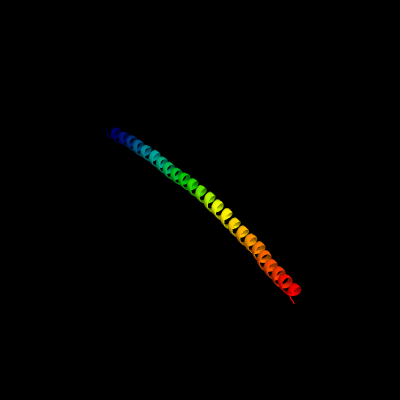
Tertiary structure of IFFO1 protein as predicted by PHYRE2 program

Structurally, it is most similar to 1GK4, which is chain A of the human vimentin coil 2b fragment (Cys2). Vimentin is a class-II intermediate filament that is found in various non-epithelial cells, especially mesenchymal cells. The vimentin protein is also responsible for maintaining cell shape, integrity of the cytoplasm, and stabilizing cytoskeletal interactions. Its 1A subunit, most similar to IFFO1 protein, forms a single, amphipathic alpha-helix that's compatible with a coiled-coil geometry. It is speculated that this chain is involved in specific dimer-dimer interactions during intermediate filament assembly. A "YRKLLEGEE" domain on the C-terminus is found to be important for the formation of authentic tetrameric complexes and also for the control of filament width during assembly.

=== Expression ===
Based on experimental data on normal tissues in the human body, IFFO1 gene is highly expressed in the cerebellum, cerebral cortex, and especially in the spleen. Medium expression is seen in several areas such as the adrenal gland, colon, lymph nodes, thymus, and ovary. The tissue areas that had the relatively low expression includes CD4 and CD8 T-cells, epidymal cells, the heart, and the stomach. Extremely low levels of expression were observed in tissues obtained from fetus, kidney, testis, thyroid, and especially in the salivary gland. However, the gene has been found to be highly expressed in chondrosarcoma. Chondrosarcoma is the cancer of the cells that generate collagen. Therefore, there seems to be an association between IFFO1's filamentous characteristic and chondrosarcoma.

=== Post-translational modifications ===
One nuclear export signal is predicted to be located at Leucine 141. The IFFO1 protein is predicted to have one 11-amino acid long nuclear localization signal at 373. Based on evidence, the protein is predicted to have high nuclear discrimination. One negative charge acidic cluster was found from amino residue 435 to 447. One repetitive sequence PAPLSPAGP appears twice at 40 to 48 and then again from 159 to 166. This proline-rich region is found to be highly conserved. One long amino acid multiplets of 5 prolines is found at 549.

4 ubiquitination sites are found on Four different Lysine residues. They can be found at Lys78, Lys103, Lys113, Lys339. Experimentally, there was evidence of 43 phosphorylation sites located on 31 serines, 7 threonines, and 5 tyrosines. Furthermore, the evidence has shown with high confidence that Ser533 is a phosphorylation site specifically for protein kinase C. The phosphorylation site at Ser162 also acts as a )-glycosylated site. This type of glycosylation functions to have proteins fold properly, stabilizes the protein, and plays a role in cell-cell adhesion. 4 sumolyated amino acids were found at Leu249, Leu293, Leu298, and Leu325. Sumolation have several effects including interfering with the interaction between the protein’s target and its partner or provide a binding site for an interacting partner, causing conformational changes of the modified target, and facilitating or antagonizing ubiquitinization. 5 glycation sites were predicted to be at Lys78, Lys256, Lys305, Lys380, and Lys478. End productions of glycation are involved in protein conformation changes, loss of function, and irreversible crosslinking.

=== Interactions ===
Evidence from two-hybrid screening exists for four protein interactions with IFFO1.

- ACAP1 (ArfGAP With Coiled-Coil, Ankyrin Repeat And PH Domains 1): GTPase-activating proteins for ADP ribosylation factor 6 needed for clathrin-dependent export of proteins from recycling endosome to the trans-golgi network and the cell surface
- RNF183 (Ring Finger Protein 183): ring finger binding protein of zinc finger that may be involved in the ubiquitination pathways
- GFI1B (Growth Factor-Independent 1B): transcription factor that plays an important role in the development and differentiation of erythroid and megakaryocytic lineages
- XRCC4: work with DNA ligase IV and DNA-dependent protein kinase in DNA repair of double-stranded breaks by non-homologous end joining

Another protein interaction with ubiquitin C was found from affinity capture-MS assay.

== Clinical relevance ==
The IFFO1 gene has not been found to be associated with any particular diseases.
