= Tampaón River =

Tampaón River Tamuin River
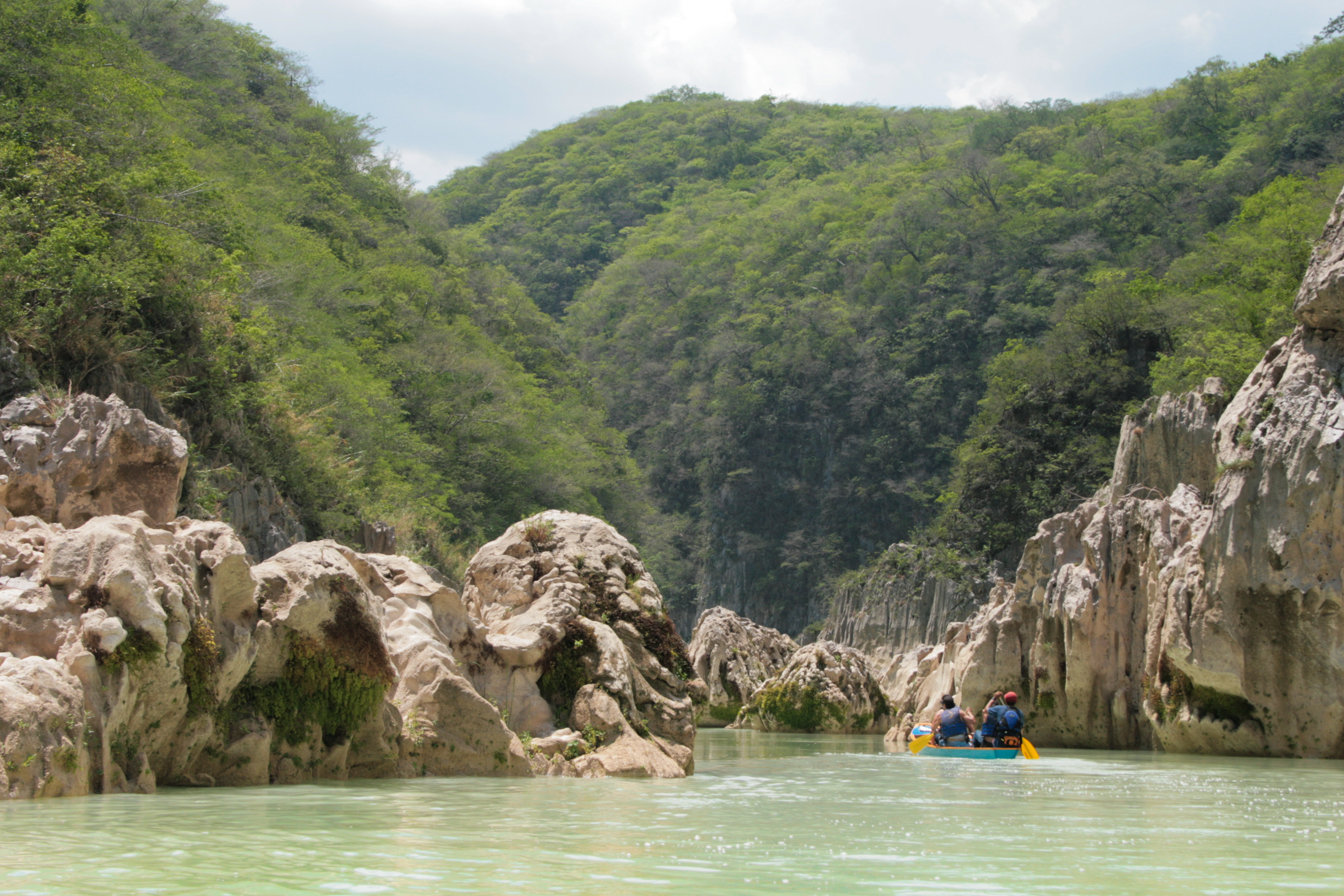

Location
- country: Mexico
- States: San Luis Potosí, Veracruz

Physical characteristics
- Source: confluence of Santa Maria River and Rio Verde
- Mouth: joins the Moctezuma River to form the Pánuco River
  - coordinates: 21°58′06″N 98°33′44″W

The Tampaón River, also known as the Tamuin River, is a river in northeastern Mexico. It is a principal tributary of the Pánuco River, draining portions of San Luis Potosí Guanajuato, Querétaro, and Veracruz states.

It is formed by the confluence of the Santa Maria River and the Rio Verde, which originate on the Mexican Plateau and flow through canyons in the Sierra Madre Oriental. The rivers join in the Sierra to form the Tampaón and it continues east, emerging onto the Gulf Coastal Plain, where it is joined by tributaries that drain the wetter eastern slopes of the Sierra Madre. It winds eastwards to join the Moctezuma River and form the Pánuco River in Veracruz state.

The eastern slopes of the Sierra are formed mostly of porous limestone, and the dissolved limestone gives the river a jade-green color.
