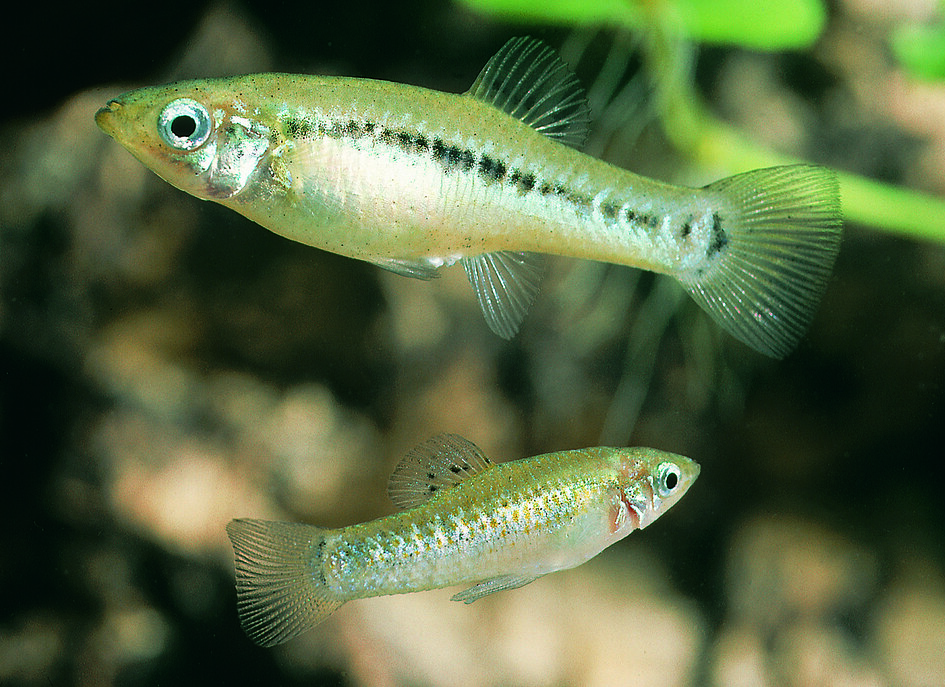
- A female (top) and a male (bottom)

Conservation status
- Data Deficient (IUCN 3.1)

Scientific classification
- Kingdom: Animalia
- Phylum: Chordata
- Class: Actinopterygii
- Division: Teleostei
- Order: Cyprinodontiformes
- Family: Poeciliidae
- Genus: Poecilia
- Species: P. latipunctata

Binomial name
- Poecilia latipunctata Meek, 1904

= Broadspotted molly =

Species of fish

Poecilia latipunctata, known as Tamesi molly or broadspotted molly, is a poeciliid fish species native to the Mexican state of Tamaulipas. It is a sperm donor for the all-female P. formosa and a protected species in Mexico.

== Description ==
Morphological examinations led to Poecilia latipunctata initially being placed in the species complex of the shortfin molly, but genetic and behavioral evidence has shown that the species belongs to the sailfin molly complex. The species is sexually dimorphic, with females being the larger sex. Individuals reach a maximum standard length of 50 mm.

== Distribution and habitat ==
Poecilia latipunctata is native to the Atlantic slope of Mexico, specifically the upper reaches of the Tamesí River, and is restricted to the Guayalejo and Mante river basins in Tamaulipas. It has also been introduced to La Media Luna lagoon near the Río Verde in San Luis Potosí. These introductions are attributed to releases by aquarists. An introduction in Florida was unsuccessful as the species has not been recorded there since 1974. The species shares its range with P. mexicana and P. formosa.

The broadspotted molly inhabits clear, moderately deep waters (1–2 m or 3.3–6.6 ft) with steady flow, favoring areas with a dense growth of submergent plants such as Potamogeton, Ceratophyllum, and Myriophyllum, and mixed substrates of gravel, mud, and rubble. It also inhabits slow-flowing irrigation ditches overhung by plants. P. latipunctata is a benthic feeder with a diet consisting predominantly of algae (including diatoms) and detritus; stomachs have been found to also contain sediment and sand grains. P. latipunctata shares its small ecological niche with P. mexicana and P. formosa, and these species may be its strong competitors.

== Reproduction ==
As in other members of the sailfin molly clade, Poecilia latipunctata males court females. Females produce few young, which grow slowly. Births occur at least by May or June, and probably continue over an extended period; a juvenile and heavily gravid females have been collected in December from a warm canal fed by the Río Mante. The fry are born very large, which is in contrast to the pattern of small poeciliids producing small offspring and large poeciliids producing large offspring. This may help the species compete with P. mexicana and P. formosa.

P. latipunctata hybridizes with P. mexicana; a single hybrid specimen, a male with a combination of nuptial colors of both species, was discovered in Llera de Canales. Although they prefer females of their own species, P. latipunctata males also mate with the females of P. formosa; the latter are an all-female species and need the sperm of males of other species, but only to trigger embryogenesis and do not use it to fertilize their eggs. P. latipunctata is one of the few sperm donors exploited by P. formosa in nature.

== Conservation ==
Poecilia latipunctata appears to be struggling in its native range. The greatest risk is posed by invasive species and agricultural activity, which breaks up and degrades the species' habitat. The International Union for Conservation of Nature (IUCN) has evaluated the species differently over the years. In 1990 and 1994 the species was declared vulnerable and in 1996 critically endangered. As of 2019, the IUCN holds that there is not enough information about the species' population and distribution to assess its risk of extinction. The species is protected by Mexican law. No conservation measures are in place.
