= Santa Maria River (San Luis Potosi) =

Location
- Country: Mexico
- States: San Luis Potosí, Guanajuato, Querétaro

Physical characteristics
- Mouth: Tampaón River
  - coordinates: 21°48′05″N 99°10′47″W

The Santa Maria River is a river in Mexico. It originates on the Mexican Plateau in the states of San Luis Potosí and Guanajuato, and flows eastward and northward. For much of its length, it forms the border between San Luis Potosí and Guanajuato. It carves a canyon through the Sierra Madre Oriental, where it is joined by the Rio Verde. The Gallinas River merges into it via the 105-meter Tamul Waterfall, downstream of which its name changes to the Tampaón River. The Tampaón continues eastward to join the Moctezuma River and form the Pánuco River, which empties into the Gulf of Mexico at Ciudad Madero.

== See also ==
- List of rivers of Mexico
