= Calabazas shiner =

Notropis calabazas

Scientific classification
- Domain: Eukaryota
- Kingdom: Animalia
- Phylum: Chordata
- Class: Actinopterygii
- Order: Cypriniformes
- Family: Leuciscidae
- Subfamily: Pogonichthyinae
- Genus: Notropis
- Species: N. calabazas

Binomial name
- Notropis calabazas J. Lyons & Mercado-Silva, 2004

Species of fish

The Calabazas shiner (Notropis calabazas) is a species of ray-finned fish in the genus Notropis. It is endemic to central Mexico, where it is found in the Rio Panuco basin.
