= Tampico Bridge =

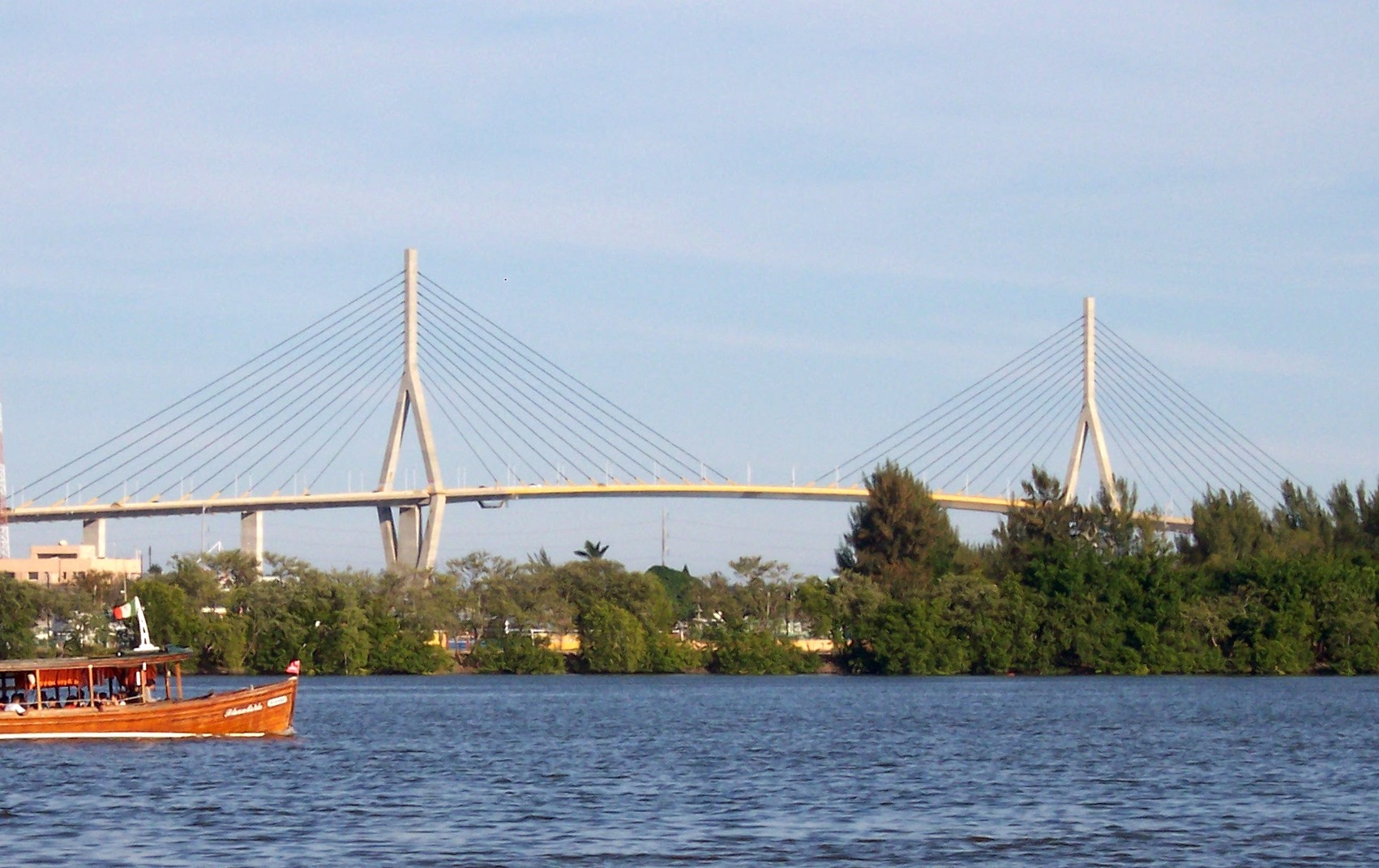
- Bridge and Pánuco River
- Coordinates: 22°13′42″N 97°50′13″W
- Carries: Mexican Federal Highway 180
- Crosses: Pánuco River
- Locale: Tampico, Tamaulipas & Pueblo Viejo Municipality, Veracruz, Mexico
- Official name: Puente Tampico
- Maintained by: Caminos y Puentes Federales

Characteristics
- Design: Cable-stayed bridge
- Total length: 1,543 m (5062 ft)
- Width: 18 m (59 ft)
- Height: 55 m (180 ft)
- Longest span: 360 m (1181 ft)

History
- Opened: October 17, 1988

Statistics
- Toll: 32 pesos

Location
- Interactive map of Tampico Bridge

The Tampico Bridge (Spanish: Puente Tampico) is a vehicular cable-stayed bridge connecting the Mexican states of Tamaulipas and Veracruz in eastern Mexico.

== Geography ==
The bridge crosses the Pánuco River near the coast of the Gulf of Mexico.

It connects the city of Tampico in Tamaulipas and Pueblo Viejo Municipality in Veracruz.

== Design and engineering ==
The bridge has been in service since 1988 and was designed by Professor Modesto Armijo Mejia from COMEC, a Mexican engineering company. It was designed to withstand the severe Atlantic hurricanes from the Gulf of Mexico.

The bridge uses an orthotropic steel deck girder for a central section of the 360 metres (1,180 ft) long main span, while the rest of the main span and the short lateral spans are a prestressed concrete girder. Both steel and concrete deck girders have the same external shape. This original design principle was later used for the 756-metre (2,480 ft) main span of the Pont de Normandie, a cable-stayed bridge in Normandy, France.

The dynamic analysis of the bridge under turbulent cyclonic winds, as well as the revision of the structural project, and the geometry plus stress control of the bridge during erection, were achieved by Alain Chauvin from Sogelerg, using the French "Scanner" computer program.

== Toll ==
The bridge is tolled by Caminos y Puentes Federales, which charges cars 38 pesos to use it, as of July 2024.

== Gallery ==
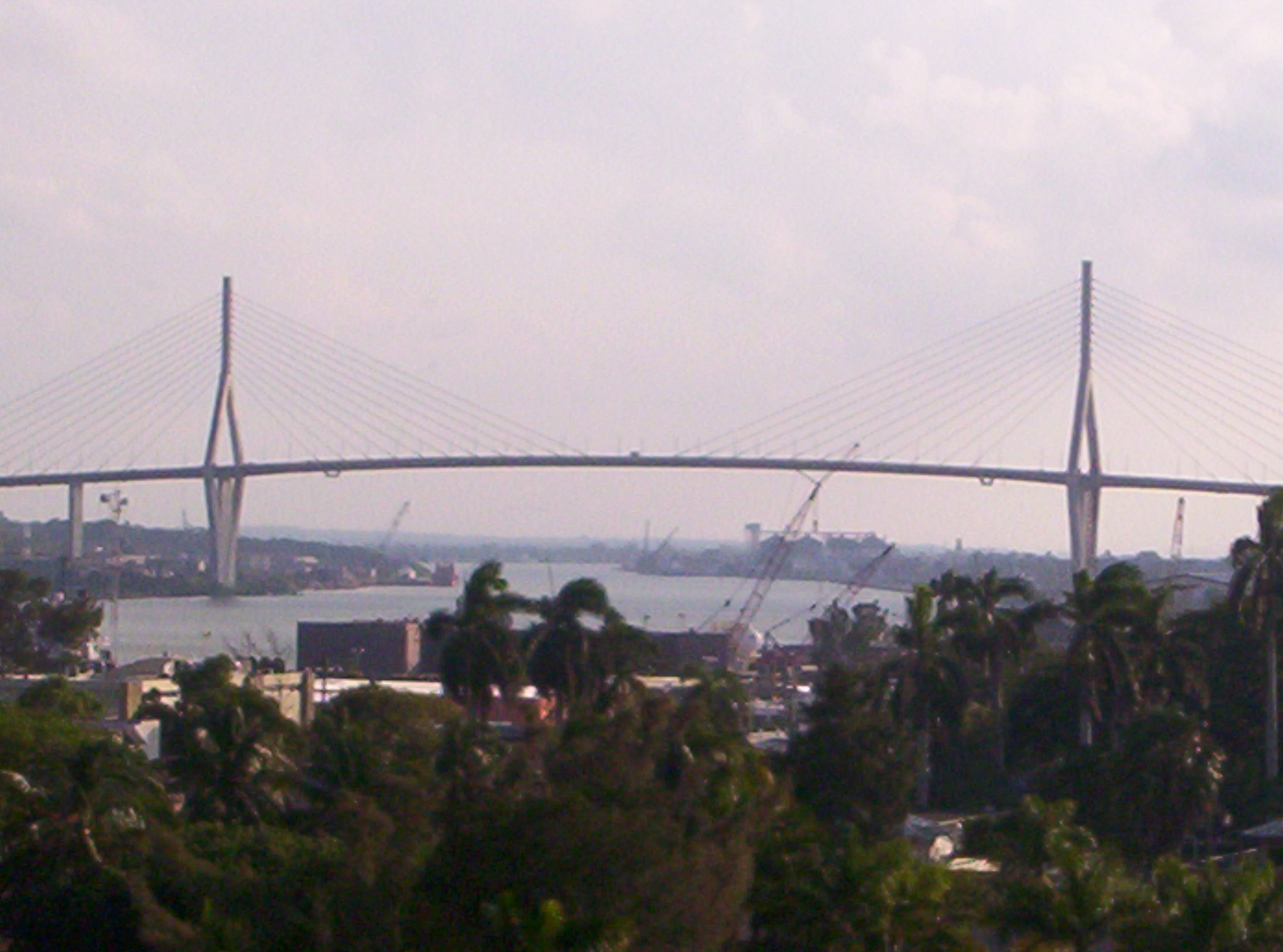

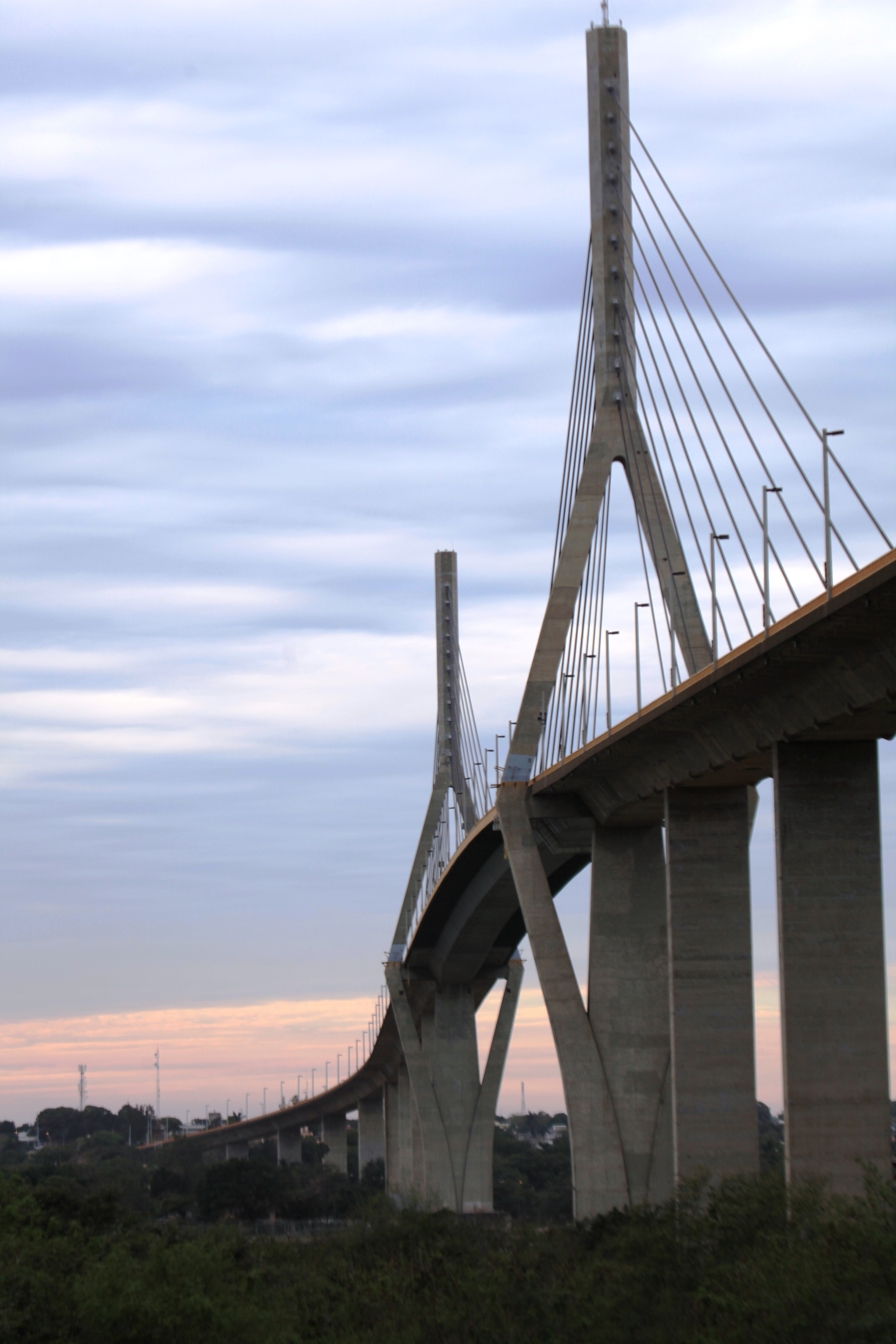

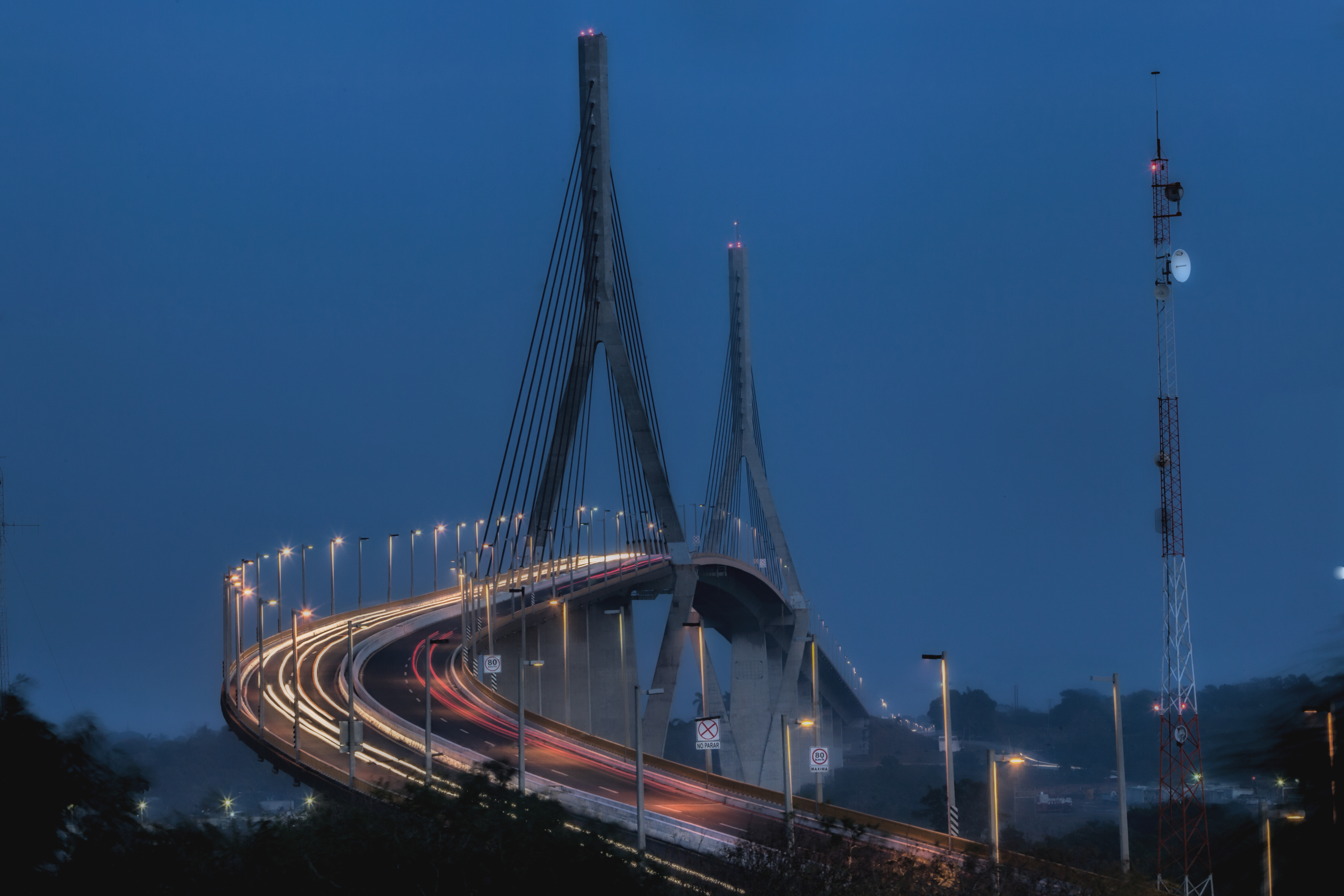

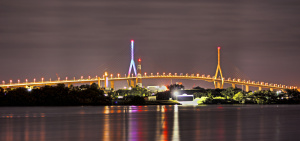

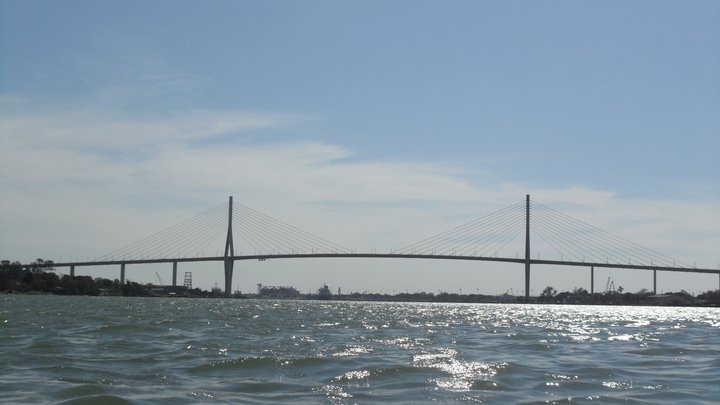
