= Jesús Santa Cruz =

Mexican footballer (born 1986)

Personal information
- Full name: Jesús Alberto Santa Cruz Mares
- Date of birth: March 25, 1986 (age 40)
- Place of birth: Tampico, Tamaulipas, Mexico
- Height: 1.79 m (5 ft 10 in)
- Position: Goalkeeper

Team information
- Current team: Puebla F.C.
- Number: 24

Senior career*
Years	Team	Apps	(Gls)
2007–	Puebla F.C.	30	(0)
- * Club domestic league appearances and goals as of 23 May 2009

Jesús Alberto Santa Cruz Mares (born 25 March 1986) is a Mexican footballer, who plays as goalkeeper for Puebla F.C. in Primera División.
