= Tampico =

- City
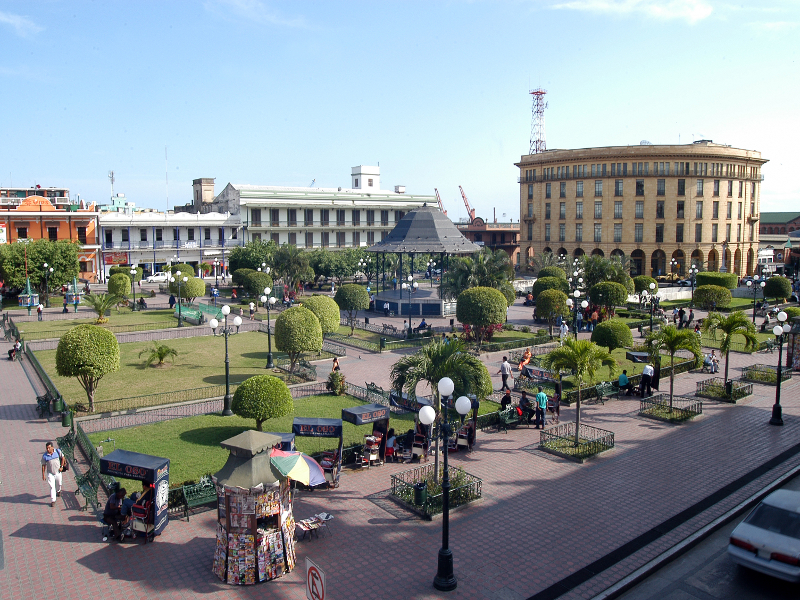
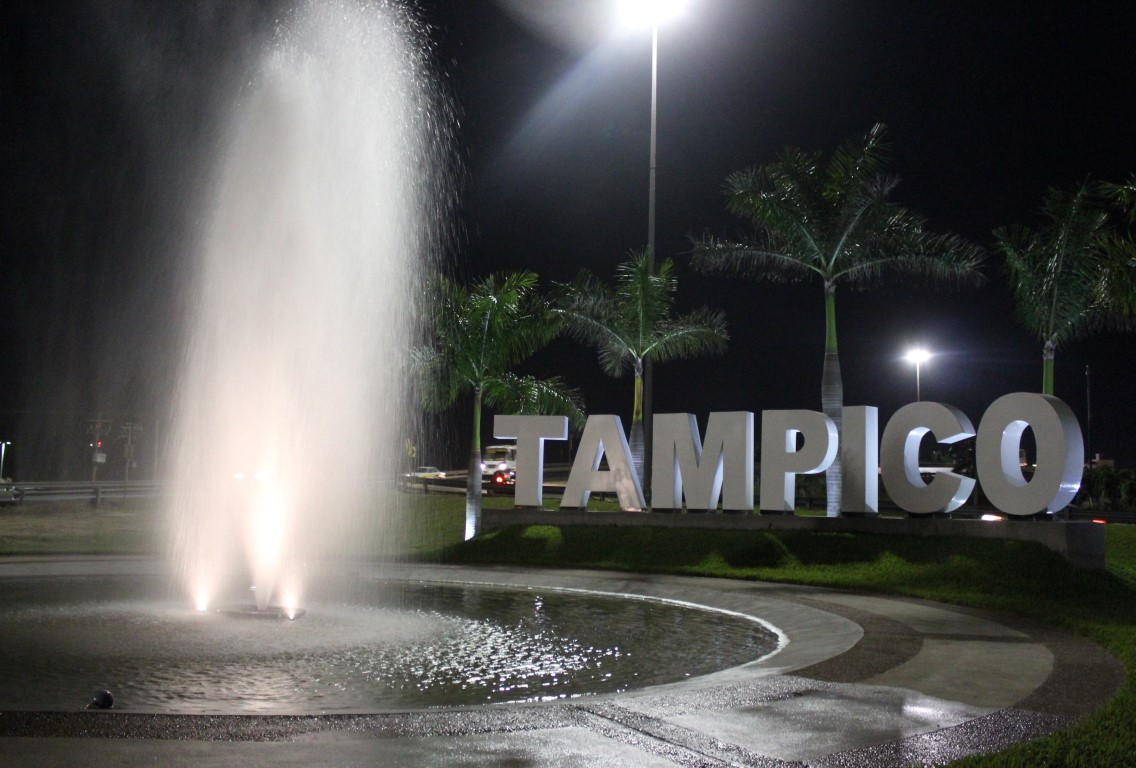
- Plaza de la Libertad Monumental letters of Tampico

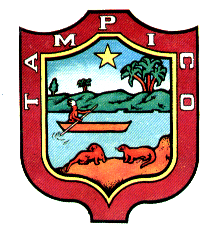
- Coat of arms
- Motto: Tampico Brilla (Tampico Shines)
- Interactive map of Tampico
- Location within Tamaulipas Location within Mexico
- Coordinates: 22°15′19″N 97°52′07″W
- Country: Mexico
- State: Tamaulipas
- Municipality: Tampico
- Founded: April 13, 1823

Government
  - Mayor: Mónica Villarreal Anaya (MORENA)

Area
  - City: 92.73 km^{2} (35.80 sq mi)
- Elevation: 10 m (33 ft)

Population (2020)
  - City: 297,373
  - Density: 3,207/km^{2} (8,306/sq mi)
  - Metro: 927,379
  - Demonym: Tampican (Spanish: Tampiqueño)

GDP (PPP, constant 2015 values)
  - Year: 2023
  - Total: $23.4 billion
- Time zone: UTC–06:00 (Zona Centro)
- Postal code: 89000 (Center)
- Area code: +52 833
- Website: www.tampico.gob.mx

Tampico is a city and port in the southeastern part of the Mexican state of Tamaulipas. It is located on the north bank of the Pánuco River, about 10 kilometers (6 mi) inland from the Gulf of Mexico, and directly north of the state of Veracruz. Tampico is the fifth-largest city in Tamaulipas, with a population of 314,418 in the city proper and 929,174 in the metropolitan area.

During the period of Mexico's first oil boom in the early 20th century, the city was the "chief oil-exporting port of the Americas" and the second-busiest in the world, yielding great profits that were invested in the city's famous architecture, often compared to that of Venice and New Orleans. The first oil well in Mexico was drilled near Tampico in 1901 at Ébano.

The city is also a major exporter of silver, copper, and lumber, as well as wool, hemp, and other agricultural products. Containerized cargo is mainly handled by the neighboring ocean port of Altamira.

== Etymology ==
Tampico derives form the Huastec language word tam-piko, meaning "place of otters."

== History ==
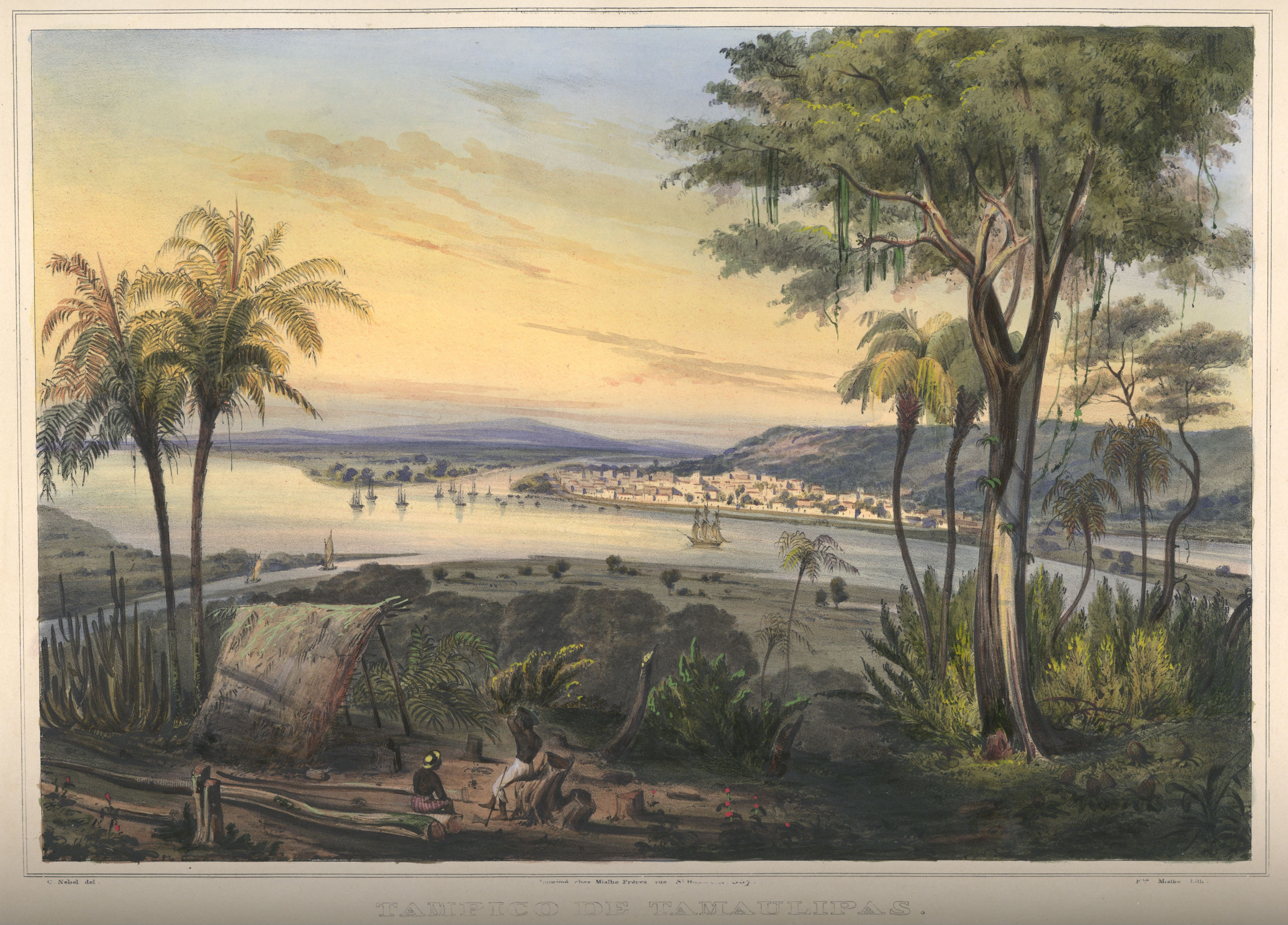
View of Tampico, 1836

The name "Tampico" is of Huastec origin, tam-piko meaning "place of water dogs" (referring to otters which are endemic of the region). The city is surrounded by rivers and lagoons of the delta of the Pánuco River, which was the habitat of a large population of otters. There have been successive human settlements in the area for centuries. The region had several early Huastec settlements, among them the important site at Las Flores, which flourished between AD 1000 and 1250.

In 1532, during the Spanish colonial period, the Franciscan priest Andrés de Olmos established a mission and monastery in the area, building over a former Huastec village. At his request, Spanish officials founded a settlement named San Luis de Tampico in 1554. This site was abandoned in 1684, and the population relocated to the south of the Pánuco River because of frequent attacks by pirates. The area was abandoned for nearly 150 years.

The present city was founded on April 13, 1823, on the north bank of the Pánuco River about 10 kilometers (6 mi) from the Gulf, after Mexico achieved independence from Spain. Tampico built its economy on the exportation of silver; business development was mostly as a trading center and market town of an agricultural region. In August 1829, Spain sent troops from Cuba to invade Tampico in an effort to regain control of the region, but in September, General Antonio López de Santa Anna forced the Spanish troops to surrender, and Mexican control of Tampico was reestablished.

=== 20th century to present ===
The first oil well in Mexico was drilled near Tampico at Ébano, S.L.P., in 1901, by Californian Edward Doheny, who founded the Mexican Petroleum Company. In the early 20th century, there was extensive U.S. investment in oil development in Tampico, with a sizable United States expatriate community developing in relation to the industry. With the outbreak of the Mexican Revolution, which lasted roughly from 1910 to 1920, the U.S. monitored the situation to protect its citizens and investments. Doheny sold some of his businesses to the Standard Oil Company which operated its monopoly here. The oil-producing area was so productive it was called the "Golden Belt".

The oil fields known as Ébano, Pánuco, Huasteca, and Tuxpan are all situated within a 160-kilometer (99 mi) radius of the city. Oil was often shipped on barges along the rivers. To improve transportation of oil to the port, the government built the Chijol Canal, beginning in 1901. It is 1.8 m (6 ft) deep and 7.6 m (25 ft) wide and runs 120 km (75 mi) southward through the oil fields to Tuxpan.

During the Mexican Revolution, on April 9, 1914, 10 Mexican soldiers and nine U.S. Navy sailors from the USS Dolphin confronted each other in a failure to communicate as U.S. forces tried to get fuel supplies. General Victoriano Huerta's forces in the city were threatened by different groups from both north and south. The Americans were arrested and later freed, but the U.S. resented Huerta's demands for some recognition. In the resulting Tampico Affair, the U.S. sent naval and marine forces into port of Veracruz and occupied the city for seven months in a show of force. Due to resulting anti-American demonstrations on each coast, other U.S. Navy ships were used to evacuate some American citizens to refugee camps in southern U.S. cities. The U.S. occupation contributed to the downfall of Huerta, and Venustiano Carranza became president. He ensured that Mexico maintained neutrality during World War I, in part due to lingering animosity against the U.S. for these actions.

In the 1970s, Tampico annexed the port city and suburb of Ciudad Madero, which now comprises part of the Tampico metropolitan area. Tampico has a modern port with excellent facilities, as well as rail and air connections to Mexico City and the United States.

The Mexican government nationalized the oil industry in 1938 and has maintained that for 86 years. In November 2014, President Enrique Peña Nieto announced a policy change of ending Pemex's monopoly and inviting private companies back into the oil and gas industry. While analysts believe the largest finds are likely to be offshore, new techniques may yield oil even at mature fields such as those of Tampico. In early 2015, the government planned to accept bids on 169 blocks, 47 of which are within 110 kilometers (70 mi) of Tampico. It is expected that smaller companies will be active in the mature fields, such as those in this region. This area has extensive shale oil deposits, and the "U.S. Energy Information Administration estimates that Mexico has the world's eighth-largest shale-oil resources."

== Architecture ==
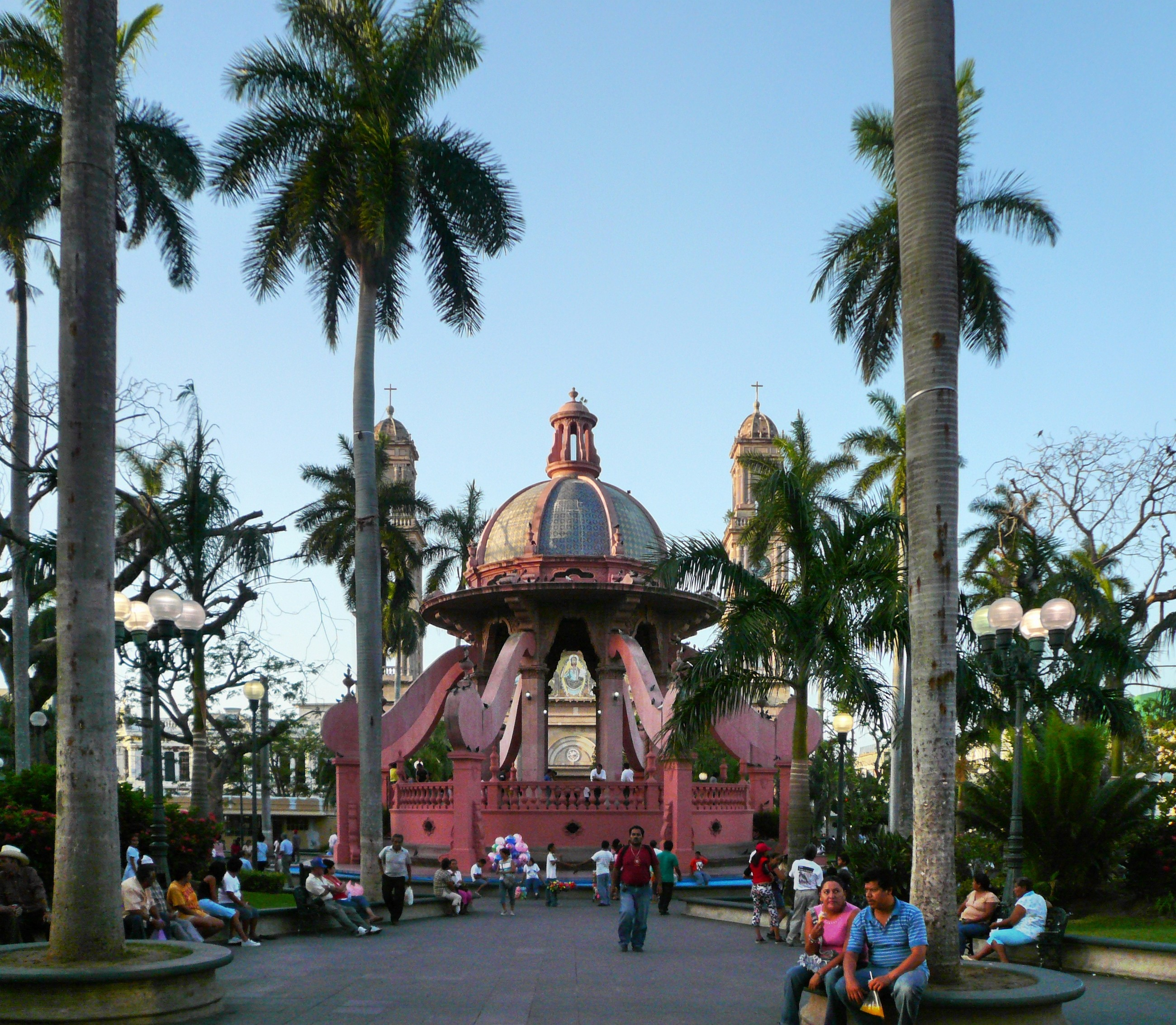
Plaza de Armas

Tampico's downtown architecture is an eclectic mix, reflecting the growth of the city during the Porfiriato (the period of rule by President Porfirio Díaz). During the oil boom of the first decades of the 20th century, much "grandiose" architecture was built, inviting comparisons with Venice, Italy, and New Orleans in the United States. Many buildings feature wrought-iron balconies (in the 20th century, these were mostly built of English cast iron). Similar balconies are characteristic of the French and Spanish-influenced architecture in New Orleans. Some of the balconies in Plaza de la libertad bear the original plaques showing their manufacture at the Derbyshire forge of Andrew Handyside and Company.

Notable buildings include the neoclassical Town Hall (or Palacio Municipal) in Plaza de Armas, and the English redbrick Customs House in the docks. The prevalence of New Orleans-style architecture is attributed to the oil boom years. Not only was there money to spend, but many building supplies, including pre-built housing components, were shipped from New Orleans to this area during that period of rapid development. The historical downtown areas of Plaza de Armas and Plaza de Libertad have been restored and improved in recent years to emphasize their historic appeal, in part to encourage more heritage tourism.

The Cathedral of Tampico, also known as the Temple of the Immaculate Conception, located in Plaza de Armas, dates to the late 19th century. It has undergone several restorations. It is of the neoclassical style in light brown canter, with Corinthian-style columns and three enormous doors that form the entrance. Its two towers are made of three bodies. The eastern one has a large, London-made, public chiming clock, a gift from Don Angel Sainz Trapaga. Its recently refurbished interior holds several wall paintings and other works of art. The altar is of white Carrara marble. The United States oil tycoon Edward Doheny of California, who drilled the first oil well in Mexico near Tampico, donated substantial funds for the cathedral's construction and maintenance after 1902, when he based his Mexican oil operations in Tampico.

== Demographics ==
According to the INEGI 2010 census, the population of the city of Tampico was 297,284, and that of the municipality of Tampico was 297,554, both ranking fifth in the state of Tamaulipas. The population of the Tampico—Ciudad Madero—Altamira metropolitan area was estimated at 859,419 people in 2010. The municipality has an area of 92.73 square kilometres (35.80 mi^{2}).

== Geography ==
The city is located on the north bank of the Pánuco River, about 10 kilometers (6 mi) inland from the Gulf of Mexico, and directly north of the state of Veracruz.

=== Climate ===
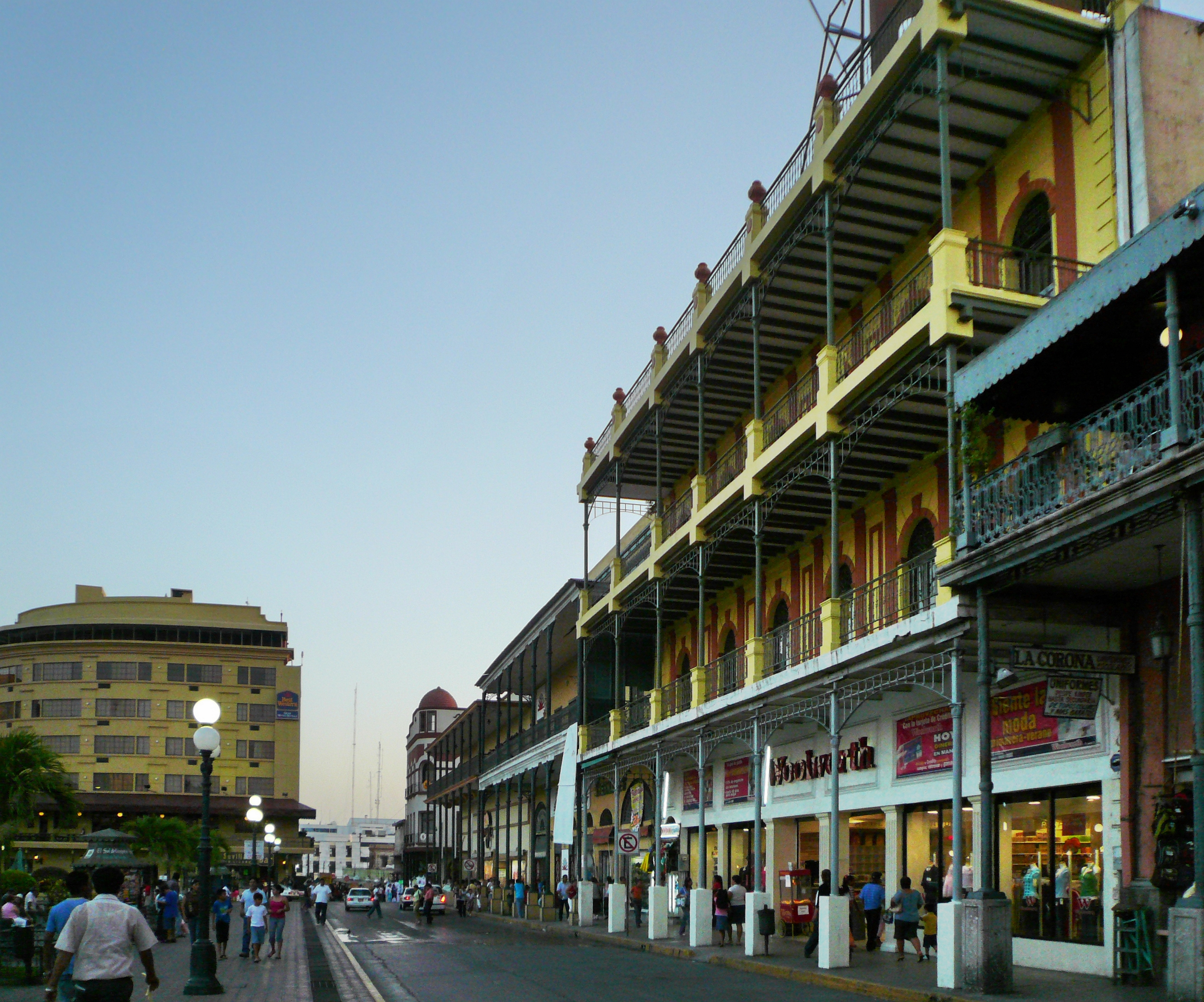
Buildings on Calle Juárez

Tampico has a tropical savanna climate (Köppen: Aw), defined as such based on the mean average temperature of 18 °C (65 °F) for January as well as on precipitation patterns. Its weather, though relatively mild in spring and autumn, is hot in the summer; the average high reaches 32 °C (90 °F) in August, with an average low of 23 °C (74 °F). Winters are warm; the average January high is 23 °C (73 °F) and the average low in January is 13 °C (58 °F). Rainfall is frequent from June through October.

Tampico is an extremely humid city, with summer heat indices reaching 40 °C (104 °F). It is located on the Pánuco River and among extensive wetlands adjacent to the Gulf of Mexico. During autumn and winter, it is affected by cold fronts that pass through the gulf and bring high winds that can reach 50 km/h (37 mph) with gusts of 70 to 80 km/h (43 to 50 mph). Tampico is also located in a hurricane area, but it has not been directly affected by one since October 1966.

On rare occasions, the city experiences surprisingly low temperatures for its zone; during late January and early February 2011, a cold wave caused temperatures to drop to 5 °C (41 °F), with the lowest being 0 °C (32 °F) in the morning and noon of 4 February. In February 1895, snow was reported to have fallen in Tampico. This is the North American record for the farthest south report of snow at a coastal location, and makes Tampico one of the few places where snow has fallen in the tropics at sea level.

Climate data for Tampico (1991–2020)
Month	Jan	Feb	Mar	Apr	May	Jun	Jul	Aug	Sep	Oct	Nov	Dec	Year
Record high °C (°F)	37.0 (98.6)	36.5 (97.7)	43.0 (109.4)	43.4 (110.1)	43.5 (110.3)	40.4 (104.7)	38.0 (100.4)	40.2 (104.4)	39.0 (102.2)	38.8 (101.8)	37.5 (99.5)	36.2 (97.2)	43.5 (110.3)
Mean daily maximum °C (°F)	23.4 (74.1)	25.2 (77.4)	27.3 (81.1)	29.7 (85.5)	31.7 (89.1)	32.8 (91.0)	32.6 (90.7)	33.2 (91.8)	32.2 (90.0)	30.5 (86.9)	27.4 (81.3)	24.6 (76.3)	29.2 (84.6)
Daily mean °C (°F)	19.3 (66.7)	20.9 (69.6)	23.2 (73.8)	25.8 (78.4)	28.1 (82.6)	29.2 (84.6)	29.0 (84.2)	29.3 (84.7)	28.4 (83.1)	26.6 (79.9)	23.2 (73.8)	20.6 (69.1)	25.3 (77.5)
Mean daily minimum °C (°F)	15.2 (59.4)	16.7 (62.1)	19.1 (66.4)	21.9 (71.4)	24.5 (76.1)	25.7 (78.3)	25.4 (77.7)	25.5 (77.9)	24.6 (76.3)	22.7 (72.9)	19.0 (66.2)	16.5 (61.7)	21.4 (70.5)
Record low °C (°F)	1.0 (33.8)	1.4 (34.5)	8.0 (46.4)	12.0 (53.6)	15.2 (59.4)	19.5 (67.1)	20.0 (68.0)	19.5 (67.1)	16.5 (61.7)	9.0 (48.2)	5.4 (41.7)	−1.5 (29.3)	−1.5 (29.3)
Average precipitation mm (inches)	33.5 (1.32)	22.7 (0.89)	26.8 (1.06)	24.8 (0.98)	48.8 (1.92)	161.9 (6.37)	137.6 (5.42)	145.3 (5.72)	300.2 (11.82)	174.6 (6.87)	57.4 (2.26)	25.3 (1.00)	1,158.9 (45.63)
Average precipitation days (≥ 0.1 mm)	6.4	4.4	3.9	3.3	3.8	8.7	9.7	10.1	14.6	10.5	7.2	5.4	88
Average relative humidity (%)	78	78	77	77	78	78	78	77	78	77	78	77	78
Mean monthly sunshine hours	127	136	180	193	226	236	242	233	188	187	151	132	2,231
Source 1: SMN (humidity 1981–2000)
Source 2: Ogimet (sun 1991–2020)

== Transportation ==
The metropolitan area of Tampico, Ciudad Madero, and Altamira is served by General Francisco Javier Mina International Airport (IATA airport code: TAM), which is located in the northern part of the city of Tampico. It serves routes to Mexican cities, mainly Mexico City and Monterrey, and also has international services, with daily flights to Houston, Texas and Dallas/Fort Worth, Texas.

The city also has excellent railway facilities serving the port, which is well-developed with warehouses and equipment for loading oil tankers. Major roads connect to the Pan-American Highway.

== Food ==
Tampico is known for its food. Seafood is important in the city. The locals are informally known as Jaibas (crabs), and the crab emblem is seen in many places, from sports logos to the sides of buses to park benches. There are also typical dishes of the area, mainly the "torta de la barda" which is a sandwich that contains over 12 toppings, and the famous "tampiqueña" which is steak with refried beans and "entomatadas" (tortillas with tomato sauce and cheese).

== Education ==
The Autonomous University of Tamaulipas has one of its two largest campuses in Tampico, the other being in Ciudad Victoria. The major schools of medicine, engineering, nursing, dentistry, architecture, and business are based here.

Multiple high schools, both private and public, are located in Tampico.

== Sports ==
The local professional football team, Tampico Madero F.C., was founded in 1945 and is also known as La Jaiba Brava. They currently play in the Ascenso MX, the second tier of the Mexican football league system, and their home stadium has been the 19,415-seat Estadio Tamaulipas since 1966.

In 1953, Tampico Madero was champion of the México Primera División and also won the Campeón de Campeones title. La Jaiba Brava won consecutive Copa México titles in 1960 and 1961. The club spent most of the 1960s and 1970s in relegation but returned to the Primera División for the 1977–78 season. They finished runner-up twice in the shortened 1985 and 1986 Primera División tournaments under Chilean manager Carlos Reinoso before being relegated again in the early 1990s.

== Notable people ==
- Juan García Esquivel (1918–2002), pianist and composer of lounge music, known as "The King of Space Age Pop"
- Ernesto Corripio Ahumada (1919–2008), Archbishop of Mexico
- Linda Christian (1923–2011), actress
- Mauricio Garcés (1926–1989), actor, born Mauricio Feres Yazbeck
- Roberto Cantoral (1935–2010), composer and songwriter
- Ana María Rabatté y Cervi (1933–2010) writer and poet. One of her best-known poems was "En Vida, Hermano... en vida"
- James Carlos Blake (born 1947), American novelist
- Everette Lee DeGolyer (1886–1956), prominent oilman, geophysicist and philanthropist in Dallas, Texas
- Rodrigo González (1950–1985), rock musician, killed in the 1985 Mexico City earthquake
- José Ángel Gurría Treviño (born 1950), former Mexican Treasury Secretary and current Secretary General of the OECD
- Víctor Manuel Vucetich (born 1955), retired association football midfielder and current manager of Querétaro F.C.
- Raúl Osiel Marroquín (born 1980), serial killer
- Rafael Sebastián Guillén Vicente (born 1957), alleged by the Mexican government to be Subcomandante Marcos
- Joaquín del Olmo (born 1969), retired international football midfielder
- Cecilia Suárez (born 1971), film and television actress
- Erika Alcocer Luna (born 1974), cantante conocida por ser ganadora del reality La Academia
- Eugenio Siller (born 1977), actor and singer
- Kika Edgar (born 1977), actress and singer
- Alejandro Gomez Monteverde (born 1977), film director
- Alicja Bachleda-Curuś (born 1983), Polish actress and singer
- Jesús Santa Cruz (born 1986), Mexican footballer
- Rodolfo Cazaubón (born 1989), professional golfer (Web.com Tour)
- Paulina Goto (born 1991), actress and singer, former member of pop band Eme 15 and protagonist of neonate television series Miss XV (Originally from Monterrey, Nuevo León)
- Rodolfo Pizarro (born 1994), association football midfielder for C.F. Monterrey and Mexico national football team
- Raúl Curiel (born 1995), boxer

== See also ==
- Tampico Affair
- Tampico Bridge
- Immaculate Conception Cathedral, Tampico
