= Tamesí River =

Tamesí River (Tamesí /Xigüe / Guayalejo)
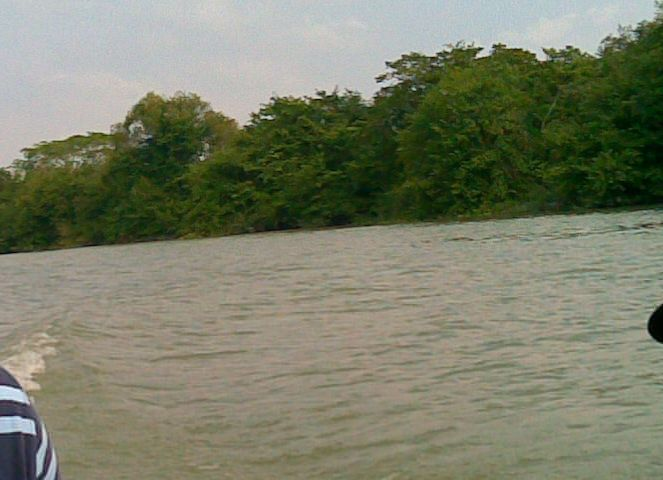

Location
- Country: Mexico

The Tamesí River is a river in northeast Mexico. It is a part of the Pánuco River basin, in which it converges about 16 km from its mouth in the Barra de Tampico, in the Gulf of Mexico.

== See also ==
- List of rivers of Mexico
