= Río Verde (San Luis Potosi) =

River in Mexico

Location
- Country: Mexico

Physical characteristics
- Mouth
  - location: Pánuco River, San Luis Potosí

Río Verde (Spanish for "green river") is a river of San Luis Potosí state in eastern Mexico.

It is a tributary of the Pánuco River, which empties in to the Gulf of Mexico.

== See also ==
- List of rivers of Mexico
