= Buchozia gervillii =

Scientific classification
- Kingdom: Animalia
- Phylum: Mollusca
- Class: Gastropoda
- Subclass: Caenogastropoda
- Order: Neogastropoda
- Superfamily: Conoidea
- Family: Mangeliidae
- Genus: †Buchozia
- Species: †B. gervillii

Binomial name
- †Buchozia gervillii (G.P. Deshayes, 1862)

Synonyms
- † Etallonia gervillii Deshayes, 1862 superseded combination; † Oenopota (Buchozia) gervillii (Deshayes, 1862) superseded combination

Extinct species of gastropod

Buchozia gervillii is an extinct species of sea snail, a marine gastropod mollusk in the family Mangeliidae.

== Description ==
The length of the shell attains 3 mm. The snail has a small and elongated shell with a pointed tip and a series of spiral ridges running along its length. The color of the snail is basically brownish with darker brown or black bands. Oenopota gervillii basically lives in shallow waters, up to a depth of about 200 meters, and can be found attached to rocks or other hard surfaces.

Buchozia gervillii is a benthic (bottom-dwelling) species. It is also a gonochoristic species, meaning that individuals are either male or female. Reproduction typically occurs in the spring and summer months, when water temperatures are warmer, and food is more abundant. Females release eggs into the water column, which are then fertilized externally by sperm released by males. The larvae that hatch from these eggs undergo a pelagic phase, during which they drift in the ocean currents before settling back down onto the seafloor and metamorphosing into juvenile snails.

== Distribution ==
This extinct marine species was found in Eocene strata in Ukraine. Specifically, the species is known to occur from central Peru to central Chile, although it may have a wider distribution that has not yet been fully documented.

Within this range, Oenopota gervillii can be found in a variety of coastal marine habitats, including rocky intertidal zones, sandy beaches, and subtidal waters up to depths of around 100 meters. The species is basically found living on or in the sediment or rocks and may occur in dense aggregations in certain areas.

Oenopota gervillii is a relatively common species within its range and is not considered to be threatened or endangered at this time. However, like many marine species, the snail may be vulnerable to habitat loss, pollution, overfishing, and other anthropogenic threats. Efforts to protect sensitive marine habitats and promote sustainable harvesting practices are therefore important for ensuring the continued survival of Oenopota gervillii and other important components of marine ecosystems.
