= Human impact on river systems =

Many river systems are shaped by human activity and through anthropogenic forces. The process of human influence on nature, including rivers, is stated with the beginning of the Anthropocene, which has replaced the Holocene. This long-term impact is analyzed and explained by a wide range of sciences and stands in an interdisciplinary context. The natural water cycle and stream flow is globally influenced and linked to global interconnections. Rivers are an essential component of the terrestrial realm and have been a preferred location for human settlements during history. River is the main expression used for river channels themselves, riparian zones, floodplains and terraces, adjoining uplands dissected by lower channels and river deltas.

== Human impact ==
The relationship between humans and rivers, which represent freshwater environments, is complicated. Rivers serve primarily as a freshwater resource and as sinks for domestic and industrial waste water. The consequences from this usage occur from diverse activities and root themselves in complex, interdisciplinary systems and practices.

Environmental changes in rivers usually result from human development, such as population growth, the dependence on fossil resources, urbanization, global commerce and industrial and agricultural emission. Anthropogenic activities also include discrete elements like the use of fire, domestication of plants and animals, soil development, the establishment of settlements and irrigation. River ecosystems have been transformed downstream from the point of pollution. Active human transformations, river engineering, have altered the river systems and ecosystems.

=== River engineering ===
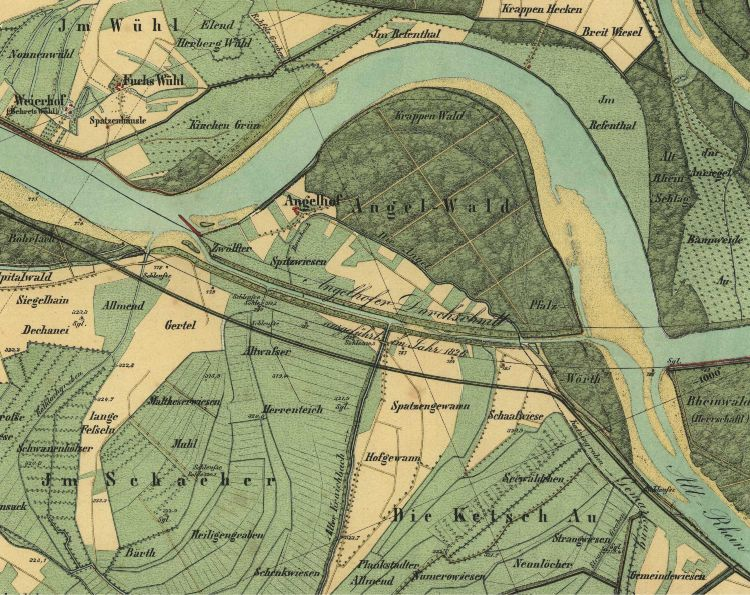
Straightening of the Rhine

River engineering, a branch of civil engineering, deals with the process of planned human intervention to improve and restore rivers for human and environmental needs. With modern technologies, data collection and modelling, navigation can be improved, dredging reduced and new habitats can be created. River engineering also handles sediment and erosion control, which can be a threat to humankind by destroying infrastructure, hindering water supply and causing major river cutoffs. River training structures will help to modify the hydraulic flow and the sediment response of a river.

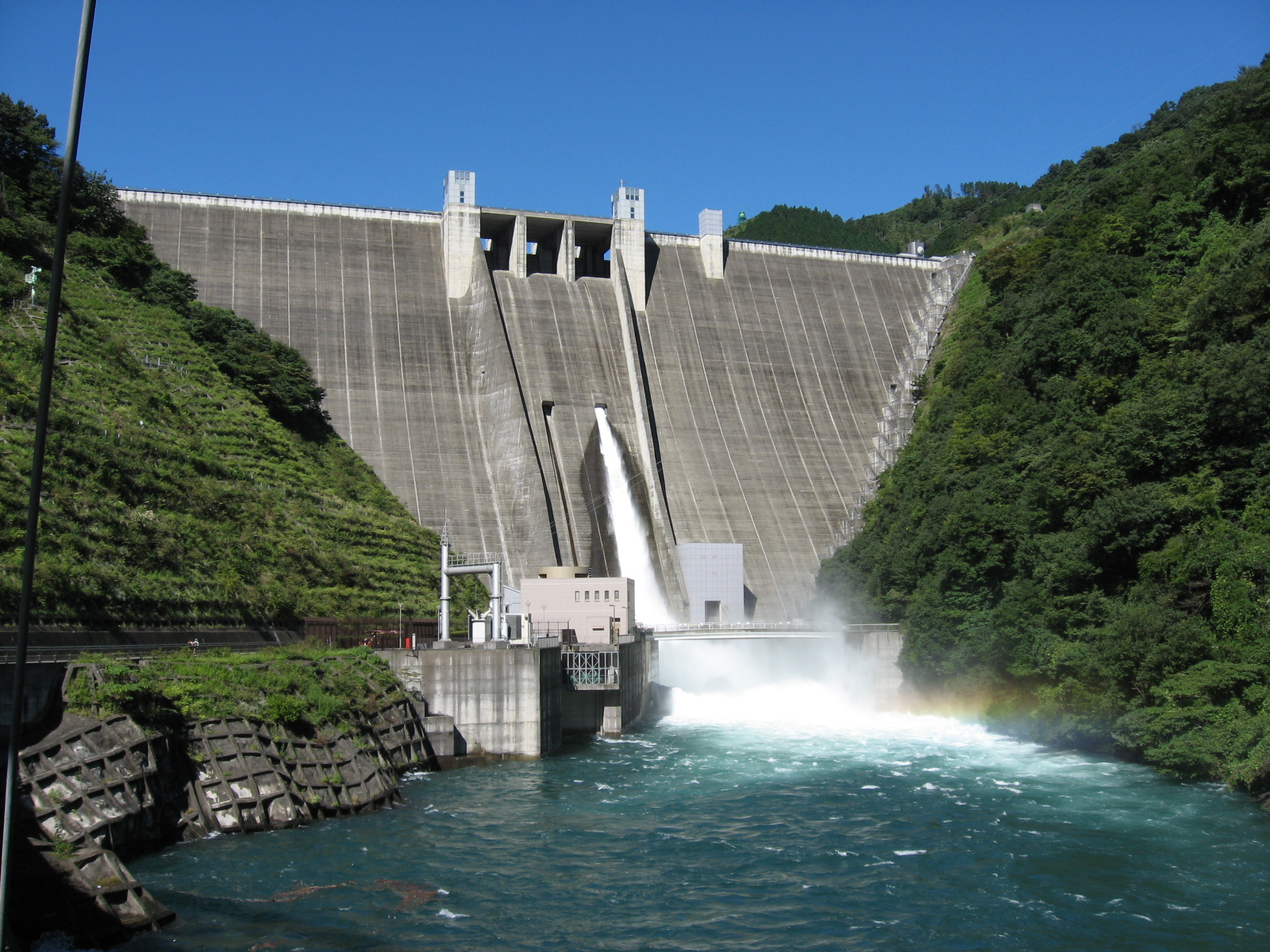
Miyagase Dam in Japan

Humans have modified the natural behavior of rivers for longer than history is recorded. The management of water resources, protection against floods and hydropower are not new concepts. Regardless, river engineering has changed in the past century because of environmental concerns. The available amount and type of data about rivers has increased which provides more useful information about the behaviour of rivers and their ecosystems. Engineering experts are able to analyse and adapt in a more environmentally conscious way. Renaturalisation projects raise more awareness for the environment, however, rapidly growing and urbanizing population needs to be supplied with enough water resources and hydropower energy, which calls for more sustainable solutions.

=== River pollution ===
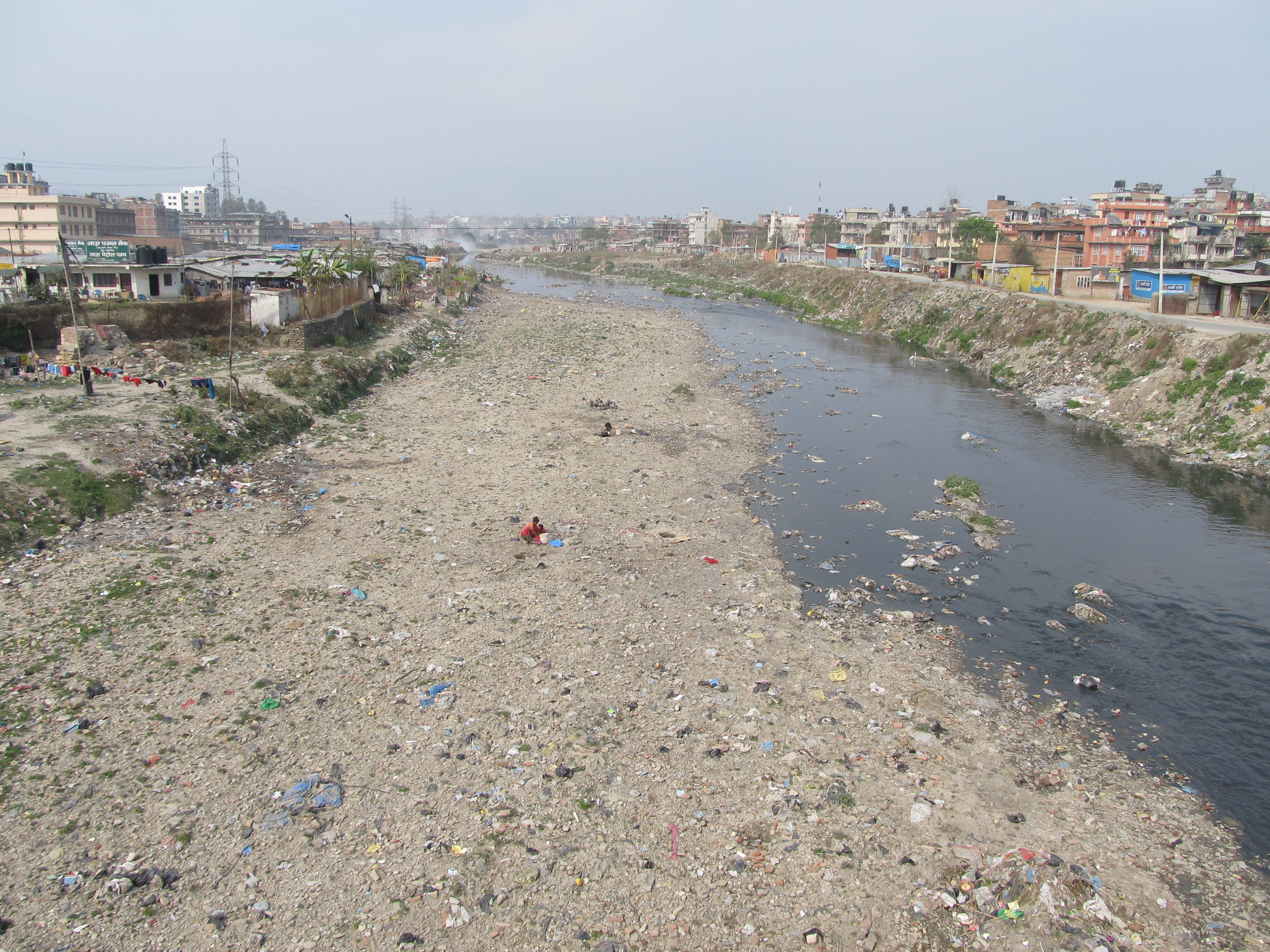
Bagmati at western Ring Road bridge between Lalitpur and Kathmandu, Nepal

Water pollution occurs when water bodies, such as rivers, lakes and oceans are contaminated with harmful substances. These substances degrade the water quality and are toxic to humans as consumers and to the environment. The contamination in a river can come from a point source or non-point source pollution. The most common types of surface water pollution are agriculture, sewage and waste water (including stormwater runoff), oil pollution and radioactive substances. The agricultural sector consumes a lot of fresh water and is the leading source for water degradation.

=== Timeline ===
Most settlements in human history were placed along rivers, developing into riverine cities and traceable by their considerable environmental footprint. The human influence on rivers can be divided into six chronological stages:

Timeline for human influence on river systems
| Time span | Era | Impacts |
|---|---|---|
| Before 15,000 BP | Minimal effects | Use of fire and gathering of plants and aquatic resources |
| After 15,000 BP | Minor effects | Increased cultivation, plant and animal domestication |
| After 9800 BP | Agricultural era | Legacy sediments, widespread fire use, first dams and irrigation, mud-brick manufacture |
| After 6500 BP | Irrigation era | Large-scale irrigation, major cities, first large dam, urban water supplies, expanded groundwater use, river fleets, alluvial mining |
| After 3000 BP | Engineering era | Embankments, dams, watermills, especially in China and the Roman Empire |
| After 1800 CE | Technological era | More varied and intense anthropological river effects |

== Consequences ==
While river engineering can improve the behaviour of the river or hold it back to adapt to our infrastructure, and therefore be rated as positive or negative impact, pollution undoubtedly has a negative impact on our environment. The consequences are very complex and difficult to measure and classify, as often benefits for humankind imply drawbacks for the environment and the other way around.

=== Indicators ===
Indicators that make the human impact measurable and quantitatively assessable are: artificial water surface ratio, artificial water surface density ratio, disruption of longitudinal connectivity ratio, artificial river ratio, sinuosity of artificial cutoff, channelization ratio, artificial levee ratio, road along river ratio, artificial sediment transport ratio and the integrated river structure impact index.

=== Material and sediment flux ===
Through anthropogenic impact the material flux of rivers has changed, which enters the sea and has a strong effect on coastal and shelf environments.

=== Runoff ===
Alternate land use, deforestation, afforestation and different types of river engineering have also led to changes in hydrologic processes, such as runoff. Mushrooming illegal mining activity can, for example, change the soil structure, the pressure-gradient between stream flow and groundwater and the vegetation cover and therefore lead to increased or decreased runoff. In southern Ghana in the Lower Pra River Basin, the percentage of runoff change, which is linked to human activity is approximately up to 66%. Human presence and infrastructure has benefited from river management, by changing and straightening rivers to make the valuable land around them more live-able.

=== Water quality ===
The consumption of polluted water leads to many deaths. In the year 2015, 1.8 million people world wide died because of water pollution and over 1 billion people became ill. Low-income and third-world communities are especially endangered, because they often live close to industries with high emission. Hazards like waterborne pathogens and diseases spread fast in water surface bodies like rivers and are especially threatening in third-world countries without sewage- and wastewater treatment systems.

=== Ecosystem and biodiversity ===
Large dams and the production of hydropower are an important part of today's energy supply and cover a broad part of river engineering. The approach of releasing small quantities of water through turbines responds to the growing power demand from rapidly growing cities; however, it also flattens the rivers hydrographs, and is responsible for a decline in seasonal hydraulic variability and for the loss of delta-building dynamics, as the sediments are stored in the reservoir. Small-scale users of the deltas lose the biodiversity and ecosystem productivity on which they depend. The aquatic ecosystem consists of a chain of organisms which are dependent on each other. When pollution causes harm to one organism only, this process can start a chain reaction and danger the entire aquatic habitat. When the proliferation of newly introduces nutrients evoke plant and algae growth, oxygen levels in the water decrease. This process, known as eutrophication, suffocates plants and animals and leads to dead zones i.e. water habitats without any life. Chemicals and heavy metals from industrial wastewater are also toxic to aquatic life. They can shorten an organism's life span and its ability to reproduce while also endangering humans, since humans may feed on these organisms and any toxic impacts on these organisms may adversely impact humans.

=== Global and social impacts ===
Rivers have always been a reliable source for human communities. They have been a preferable place for settlements in early history and still provide a rich environment for big cities. Many trade routes lead along rivers and build global connections.

== See also ==
- River engineering
- River management
- Water pollution
- Environmental engineering
- Human impact on marine life
