= Sulphur molly =

Conservation status
- Endangered (IUCN 3.1)

Scientific classification
- Kingdom: Animalia
- Phylum: Chordata
- Class: Actinopterygii
- Division: Teleostei
- Order: Cyprinodontiformes
- Family: Poeciliidae
- Genus: Poecilia
- Species: P. sulphuraria

Binomial name
- Poecilia sulphuraria (Álvarez, 1948)

Synonyms
- Mollienesia sulphuraria Álvarez, 1948

Species of fish

The sulphur molly (Poecilia sulphuraria), locally known as molly del Teapa, is an endangered species of poeciliid fish. It is endemic to the sulfur springs of the Mexican states of Chiapas and Tabasco and one of few fish able to withstand the toxicity of hydrogen sulfide. The high concentration of hydrogen sulfide in the water forces the fish to spend most of their time breathing on the surface, which exposes them to predatory birds; the species has evolved a wave-making behavior to avoid predation.

== Taxonomy ==
Poecilia sulphuraria belongs to the shortfin molly clade within the subgenus Mollienesia. It is the sister species of the widespread Atlantic molly, P. mexicana. The type locality is Baños del Azufre. Closely related Poecilia populations have been found in the nearby sulfide springs of La Gloria in the Pichucalco and Ixtapangajoya river drainages and designated P. sulphuraria. Morphological, phylogenetic, and population genetics analyses have shown the Baños de Azufre population to be more closely related to P. thermalis than to La Gloria population, meaning that they should either be treated as a distinct species or P. sulphuraria should be treated as synonymous with P. thermalis.

== Description ==
Poecilia sulphuraria has a deep, compact body with a noticeably slender caudal peduncle (tail base). The maximum recorded standard length is 50 mm. The head is broad, and the snout-to-dorsal-fin distance is long, giving the fish a somewhat front-heavy appearance. The lower lip projects beyond the upper one and bears a distinctive flat, plate-like extension that points forward and downward. This unusual lip structure is one of the most striking features of the species. The teeth are arranged in rows, with the outer teeth flattened, slightly curved backward, and only weakly attached. The eyes are large, and the space between them is broad.

The caudal fin is truncate, rather than rounded or forked. The dorsal fin is short and set far back on the body, especially in females. The anal fin differs between sexes, with males having a gonopodium that is shorter than the head. The pectoral fins are rounded, and the pelvic fins show the typical features of related livebearing fishes. The dorsal and caudal fins carry scattered dark spots, while the other fins are unmarked.

The body is covered with moderately large scales, with a consistent pattern along the sides and back. The fish are dark on the back and upper sides and silvery below. The darker scales along the upper body often have black edging, which becomes more pronounced toward the back. The gill cover is dark, and a shadowy patch on the belly reflects the dark internal lining of the body cavity. Some individuals show faint vertical bars toward the rear of the body.

== Habitat ==
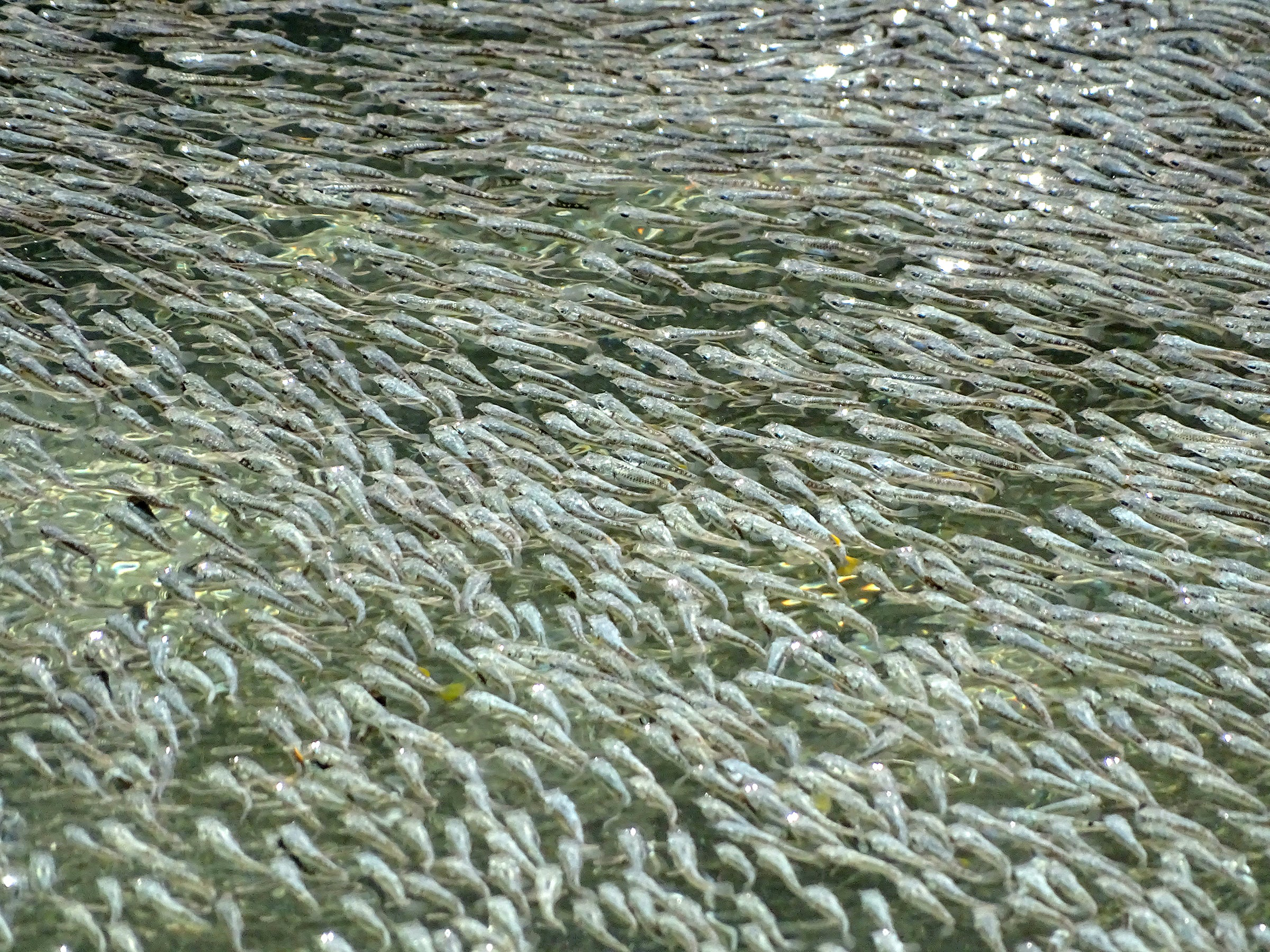
Sulfur mollies shoal at the surface to avoid the toxicity of hydrogen sulfide.

Poecilia sulphuraria is restricted to the Atlantic slope. The type locality is Baños del Azufre and their outlet stream, Arroyo Azufre, within the Grijalva River basin, about 12 km west of Teapa, on the border between the Mexican states of Chiapas and Tabasco. A molly population from La Gloria springs (Ojos del Azufre) has also been designated as P. sulphuraria.

Baños de Azufre are sulfur springs, now altered; the specific epithet refers to sulfur. Water clarity varies from transparent to cloudy, often taking on a bluish-gray hue, while temperatures reach approximately 32 °C (90 °F). The outlet stream averages is about 6.0 m wide and characterized by weakly to moderately flowing, sometimes nearly stagnant water around 26 °C (79 °F). Bottom sediments consist of marl and clayey mud. Aquatic vegetation is almost entirely lacking; small patches of green algae occur sporadically. Water depth may reach 1.4 m (4 ft 7 in) but is more commonly between 0.3 and 0.9 m (1 ft 0 in and 2 ft 11 in).

Hydrogen sulfide (H₂S), which is abundant in the sulfur molly's habitat, is a potent respiratory toxin; the few animals that tolerate it tend to be invertebrates. The sulfur molly is one of few fish that permanently inhabit sulfidic habitats, and tolerates higher concentrations of hydrogen sulfide than the other species endemic to Baños de Azufre, Gambusia eurystoma. Despite occurring only a few metres apart, Poecilia sulphuraria and P. mexicana occupied sharply different chemical environments, indicating a clear division of habitat use. The presence of hydrogen sulfide likely restricts P. mexicana from entering sulfidic waters, while P. sulphuraria, although capable of surviving in non-sulfidic conditions, may be kept out of those habitats by competition with its sister species.

The physiological or biochemical mechanisms that allow Poecilia sulphuraria to tolerate these toxic conditions have not yet been identified. In spring habitats where hydrogen sulfide levels are particularly high, P. sulphuraria is frequently seen breathing at the water surface. It has two prominent lip extensions, a feature unique among poeciliids, which may enhance surface-based oxygen uptake and represent an adaptation to the severely oxygen-poor conditions of these environments; alternatively, these may be taste organs. Tolerance to hydrogen sulfide varies within the species: fish originating from highly sulfide-rich microhabitats survive higher H₂S levels than those from areas with lower concentrations, a pattern consistent with either physiological adjustment through exposure or population-level adaptation to sulfide-rich conditions. P. sulphuraria is the sole fish species occupying the sulfurous zones immediately downstream of major sulfide springs.

Poecilia sulphuraria is listed by the International Union for Conservation of Nature as an endangered species. Although it is protected by Mexican law, no specific conservation measures are in place. Human pressure differs sharply between the two known populations. The isolated Ojo del Azufre site is only lightly affected by nearby agriculture, whereas the Baños del Azufre population faces severe disturbance. There, the springs are intensively used for recreation, and the original forested streamside zone has been completely cleared and converted into pastureland, resulting in major habitat degradation.

== Biology ==
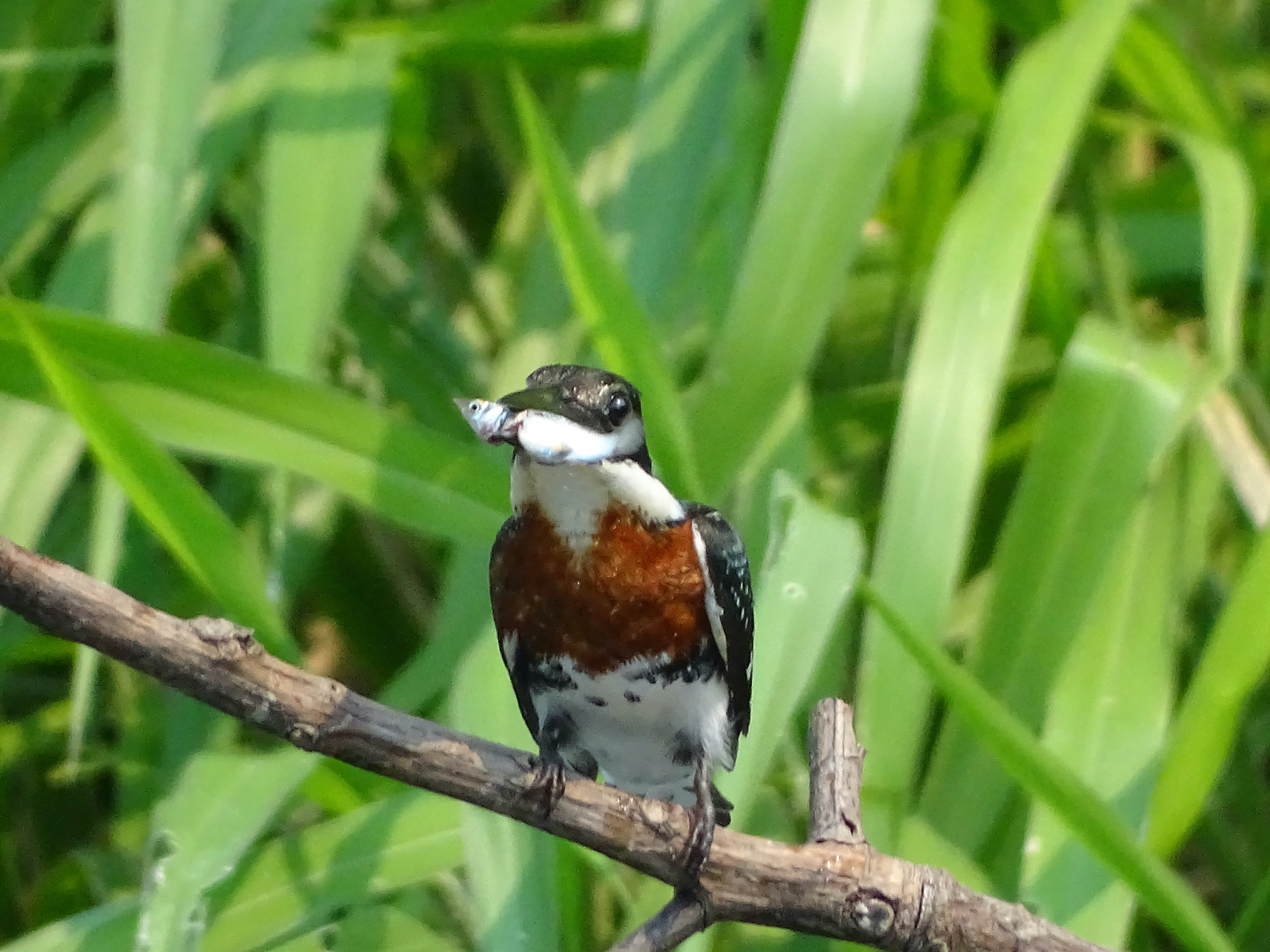
A green kingfisher with a sulfur molly in its beak. Extremophile mollies are particularly vulnerable to predation by birds.

The diet of Poecilia sulphuraria is based on detritus, sulfide bacteria, and chironomids. Sulphur mollies feed on the bottom, but have to spend most of their time breathing at the water surface to survive. This exposes them to predation from birds. P. sulphuraria displays a striking collective defense against bird predators such as green kingfishers, great kiskadees, herons and egrets. When attacked from above, thousands of fish dive downward at the same time from the water surface, creating large, repeated surface waves that can continue for up to two minutes. These coordinated wave displays are a highly visible and rhythmic anti-predator behavior, likely confusing birds or by acting as a conspicuous signal that alerts them to detection.

Juveniles measuring 11 mm standard length were collected in mid-February, while an immature female of 19 mm was recorded in mid-December, indicating reproduction likely occurs over an extended portion of the year. Newly born young are about 8.0 mm long. Sulfur mollies produce fewer but larger young compared to related species.
