= Buchozia =

Scientific classification
- Kingdom: Animalia
- Phylum: Mollusca
- Class: Gastropoda
- Subclass: Caenogastropoda
- Order: Neogastropoda
- Family: Mangeliidae
- Genus: †Buchozia; Bayan, 1873

Species
- See text

Synonyms
- Bela (Buchozia) Bayan, 1873 superseded rank; † Etallonia Deshayes, 1862 · unaccepted (invalid: junior homonym of...); † Oenopota (Buchozia) Bayan, 1873 superseded rank

Extinct genus of gastropods

Buchozia is a genus of extinct minute sea snails, marine gastropod mollusks or micromollusks in the family Mangeliidae.

== Species ==
Species within the genus Buchozia include:

- † Buchozia arthonensis Cossmann, 1896
- † Buchozia bourdoti Cossmann, 1897
- † Buchozia citharella (Lamarck, 1804)
- † Buchozia cossmanni (Glibert, 1962)
- † Buchozia drilliaeformis (Cossmann & Pissarro, 1900)
- † Buchozia elatior (Cossmann & Pissaro, 1905)
- † Buchozia entomella (Cossmann, 1889)
- † Buchozia gervillii (Deshayes, 1862)
- † Buchozia minuata (Deshayes, 1864)

Uncertain - unassessed

- † Buchozia angulifera de Boury, 1899

- † Brought into synonymy:

- † Buchozia perminuta Cossmann, 1923: synonym of † Fusulculus perminutus (Cossmann, 1923) (original combination)
- † Buchozia prisca (Deshayes, 1862): synonym of † Fusulculus priscus (Deshayes, 1862)
