= Riparian zone =

Interface between land and a river or stream

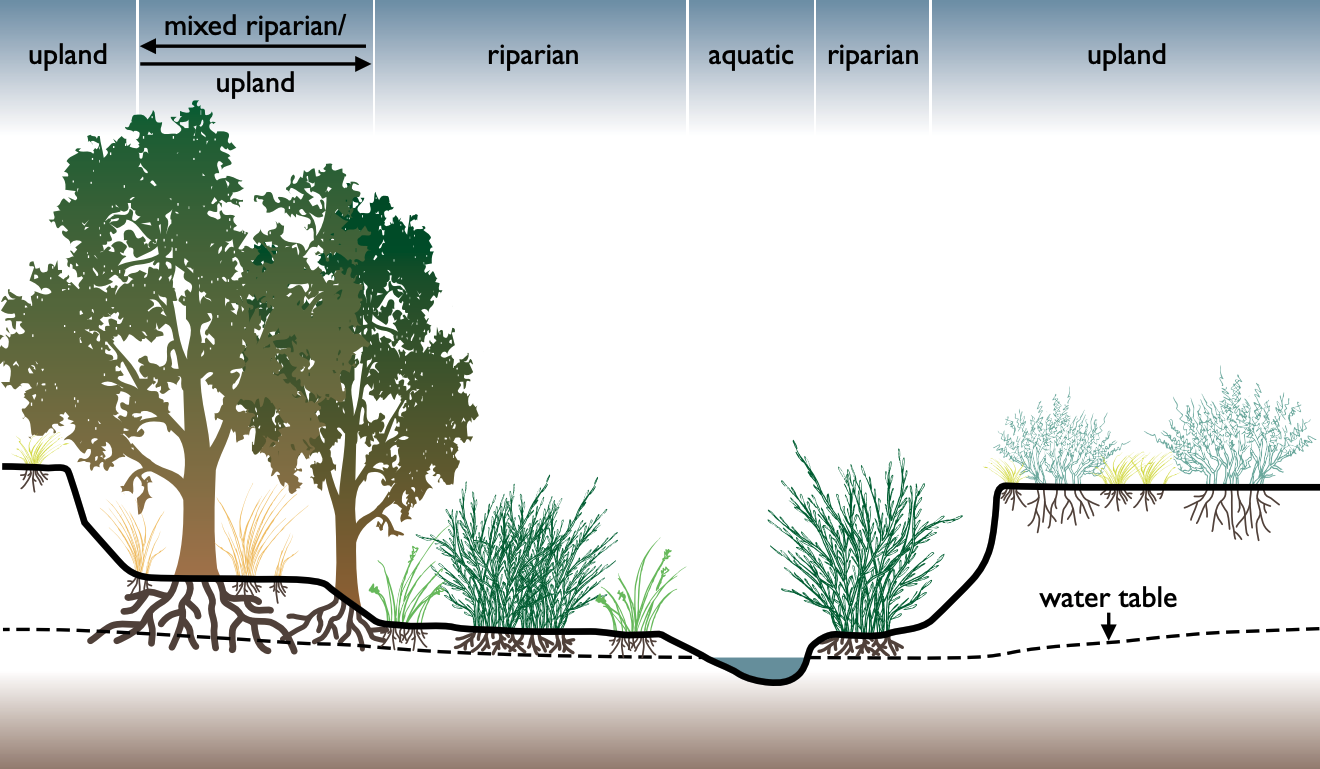
A riparian area is the transition from the aquatic area to the upland area. Vegetation is expected to change from species adapted to wetter sites near the channel to species adapted to drier sites in the upland, with a mixture of species occurring in between. In this example, an assessment of riparian function would consider the riparian areas, mixed riparian/upland areas, and aquatic area in the reach. Not all riparian areas have all of these features.

A riparian zone or riparian area is the interface between land and a river or stream. In some regions, the terms riparian buffer zone, riparian corridor, and riparian strip are used to characterize a riparian zone. The word riparian is derived from Latin ripa, meaning "river bank".

Riparian is also the proper nomenclature for one of the terrestrial biomes of the Earth. Plant habitats and communities along the river margins and banks are called riparian vegetation, characterized by hydrophilic plants. Riparian zones are important in ecology, environmental resource management, and civil engineering because of their role in soil conservation, their habitat biodiversity, and the influence they have on terrestrial and semiaquatic fauna as well as aquatic ecosystems, including grasslands, woodlands, wetlands, and even non-vegetative areas.

Riparian zones may be natural or engineered for soil stabilization or restoration. These zones are important natural biofilters, protecting aquatic environments from excessive sedimentation, polluted surface runoff, and erosion. They supply shelter and food for many aquatic animals and shade that limits stream temperature change. When riparian zones are damaged by construction, agriculture or silviculture, biological restoration can take place, usually by human intervention in erosion control and revegetation. If the area adjacent to a watercourse has standing water or saturated soil for as long as a season, it is normally termed a wetland because of its hydric soil characteristics. Because of their prominent role in supporting a diversity of species, riparian zones are often the subject of national protection in a biodiversity action plan. These are also known as a "plant or vegetation waste buffer".

Research shows that riparian zones are instrumental in water quality improvement for both surface runoff and water flowing into streams through subsurface or groundwater flow. Riparian zones can play a role in lowering nitrate contamination in surface runoff, such as manure and other fertilizers from agricultural fields, that would otherwise damage ecosystems and human health. Particularly, the attenuation of nitrate or denitrification of the nitrates from fertilizer in this buffer zone is important. The use of wetland riparian zones shows a particularly high rate of removal of nitrate entering a stream and thus has a place in agricultural management. Also in terms of carbon transport from terrestrial ecosystems to aquatic ecosystems, riparian groundwater can play an important role. As such, a distinction can be made between parts of the riparian zone that connect large parts of the landscape to streams, and riparian areas with more local groundwater contributions. Additionally, Richardson et al. showed that warming, nutrient enrichment, and predators interactively affect emergence, decomposition, phenology, and carbon cycling in riparian-stream systems.

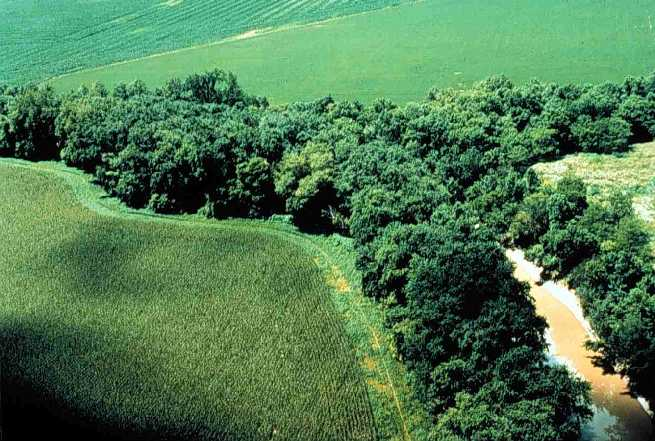
A well-preserved natural riparian strip on a tributary to Lake Erie

== Roles and functions ==
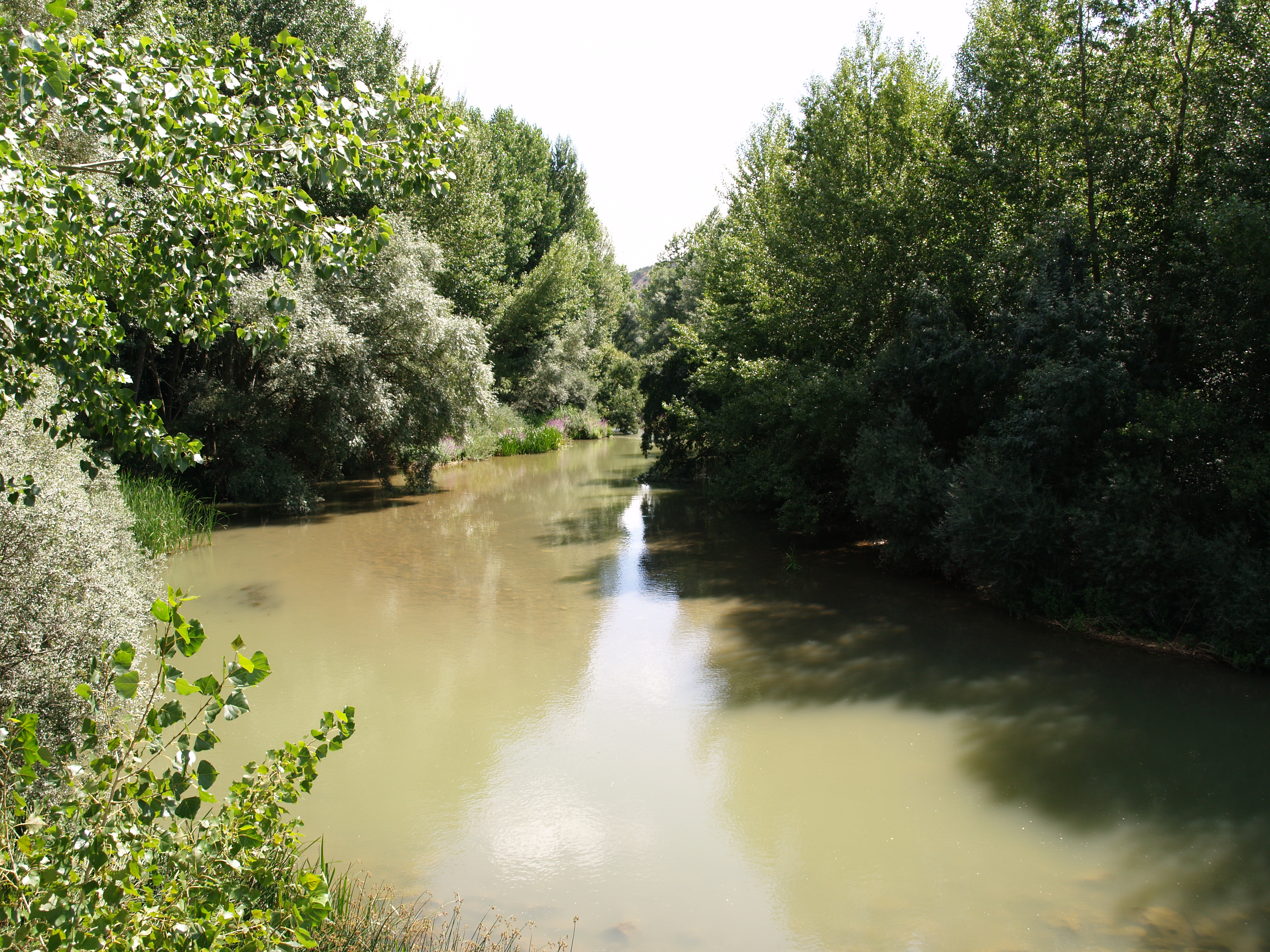
Thick riparian vegetation along the Pisuerga River in Spain

Riparian zones dissipate stream energy. The meandering curves of a river, combined with vegetation and root systems, slow the flow of water, which reduces soil erosion and flood damage. Sediment is trapped, reducing suspended solids to create less turbid water, replenish soils, and build stream banks. Pollutants are filtered from surface runoff, enhancing water quality via biofiltration.

The riparian zones also provide wildlife habitat, increased biodiversity, and wildlife corridors, enabling aquatic and riparian organisms to move along river systems avoiding isolated communities. Riparian vegetation can also provide forage for wildlife and livestock. Additionally, riparian vegetation supports the reproduction of species such as dragonflies, whose diverse egg-laying strategies depend on the presence of specific plants and substrates along stream banks.

Riparian zones are also important for the fish that live within rivers, such as brook and charr. Impacts on riparian zones can affect fish, and restoration is not always sufficient to recover fish populations.

They provide native landscape irrigation by extending seasonal or perennial flows of water. Nutrients from terrestrial vegetation (e.g. plant litter and insect drop) are transferred to aquatic food webs, and are a vital source of energy in aquatic food webs. The vegetation surrounding the stream helps to shade the water, mitigating water temperature changes. Thinning of riparian zones has been observed to cause increased maximum temperatures, higher fluctuations in temperature, and elevated temperatures being observed more frequently and for longer periods of time. Extreme changes in water temperature can have lethal effects on fish and other organisms in the area. The vegetation also contributes wood debris to streams, which is important to maintaining geomorphology.

Riparian zones also act as important buffers against nutrient loss in the wake of natural disasters, such as hurricanes. Many of the characteristics of riparian zones that reduce the inputs of nitrogen from agricultural runoff also retain the necessary nitrogen in the ecosystem after hurricanes threaten to dilute and wash away critical nutrients.

From a social aspect, riparian zones contribute to nearby property values through amenity and views, and they improve enjoyment for footpaths and bikeways through supporting foreshoreway networks. Space is created for riparian sports such as fishing, swimming, and launching for vessels and paddle craft.

The riparian zone acts as a sacrificial erosion buffer to absorb impacts of factors including climate change, increased runoff from urbanization, and increased boat wake without damaging structures located behind a setback zone.

== Role in logging ==
The protection of riparian zones is often a consideration in logging operations. The undisturbed soil, soil cover, and vegetation provide shade, plant litter, and woody material and reduce the delivery of soil eroded from the harvested area. Factors such as soil types and root structures, climatic conditions, and vegetative cover determine the effectiveness of riparian buffering. Activities associated with logging, such as sediment input, introduction or removal of species, and the input of polluted water all degrade riparian zones.

== Vegetation ==
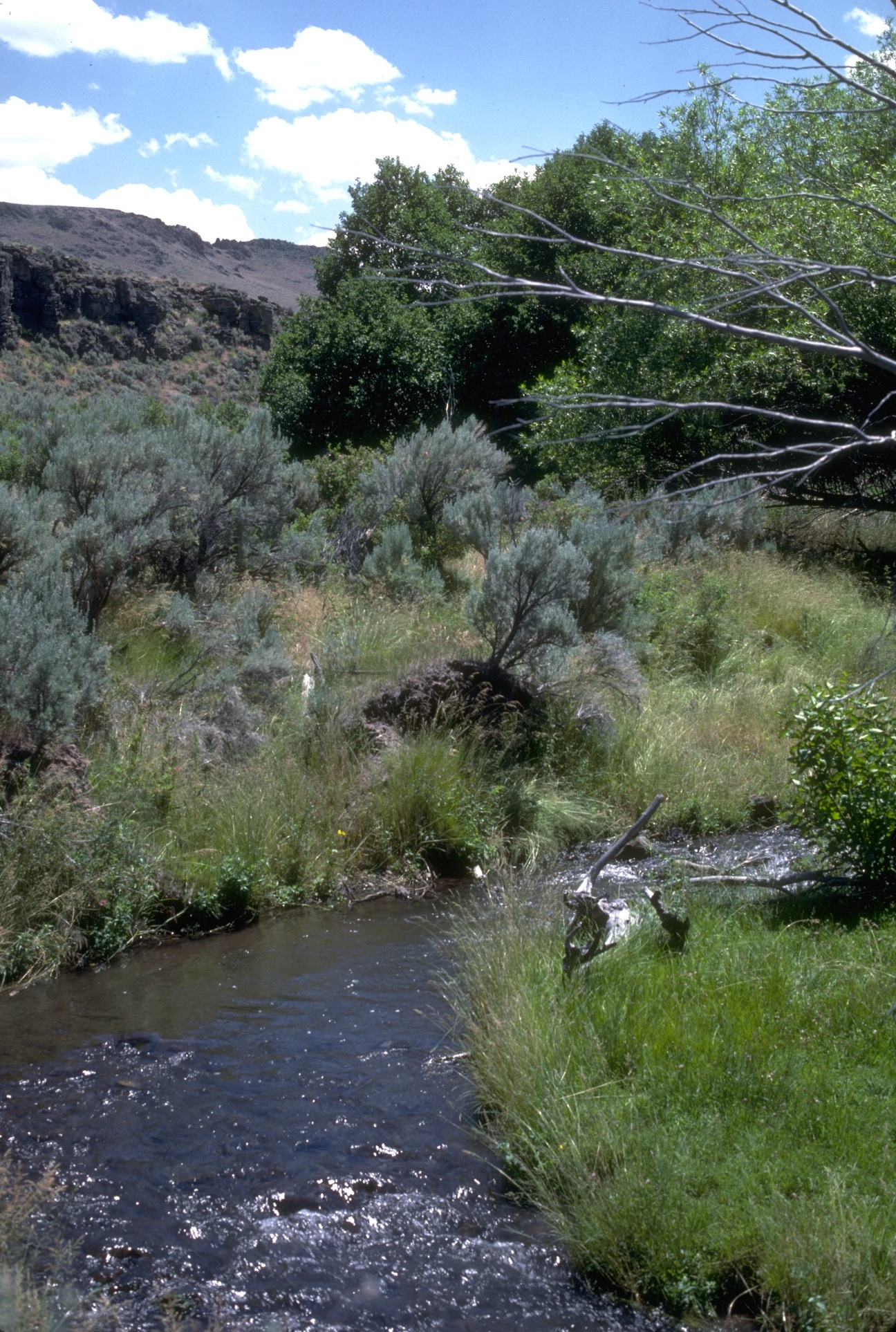
Riparian zone along Trout Creek in the Trout Creek Mountains, part of the Burns Bureau of Land Management District in southeastern Oregon. The creek provides critical habitat for trout.

The assortment of riparian zone trees varies from those of wetlands and typically consists of plants that are either emergent aquatic plants, or herbs, trees and shrubs that thrive in proximity to water. In South Africa's fynbos biome, riparian ecosystems are heavily invaded by alien woody plants. Riparian plant communities along lowland streams exhibit remarkable species diversity, driven by the unique environmental gradients inherent to these ecosystems.

== Riparian zones in Africa ==
Riparian forest can be found in Benin, West Africa. In Benin, where the savanna ecosystem prevails, "riparian forests" include various types of woodlands, such as semi-deciduous forests, dry forests, open forests, and woodland savannas. These woodlands can be found alongside rivers and streams. In Nigeria, you can also discover riparian zones within the Ibadan region of Oyo state. Ibadan, one of the oldest towns in Africa, covers a total area of 3,080 square kilometers and is characterized by a network of perennial water streams that create these valuable riparian zones. In the research conducted by Adeoye et al. (2012) on land use changes in Southwestern Nigeria, it was observed that 46.18 square kilometers of the area are occupied by water bodies. Additionally, most streams and rivers in this region are accompanied by riparian forests. Nevertheless, the study also identified a consistent reduction in the extent of these riparian forests over time, primarily attributed to a significant deforestation rate. In Nigeria, according to Momodu et al. (2011), there has been a notable decline of about 50% in the riparian forest coverage within the period of 1978 to 2000. This reduction is primarily attributed to alterations in land use and land cover. Additionally, their research indicates that if current trends continue, the riparian forests may face further depletion, potentially leading to their complete disappearance by the year 2040. Riparian zones can also be found in Cape Agulhas region of South Africa. Riparian areas along South African rivers have experienced significant deterioration as a result of human activities. Similar to many other developed and developing areas worldwide, the extensive building of dams in upstream river areas and the extraction of water for irrigation purposes have led to diminished water flows and changes in the riparian environment.

== North America ==
=== Water's edge ===
Herbaceous Perennial:

- Peltandra virginica – Arrow Arum
- Sagittaria lancifolia – Arrowhead
- Carex stricta – Tussock Sedge
- Iris virginica – Southern Blue Flag Iris

=== Inundated riparian zone ===
Herbaceous Perennial:

- Sagittaria latifolia – Duck Potato
- Schoenoplectus tabernaemontani – Softstem Bulrush
- Scirpus americanus – Three-square Bulrush
- Eleocharis quadrangulata – Square-stem Spikerush
- Eleocharis obtusa – Spikerush

=== Western ===
In western North America and the Pacific coast, the riparian vegetation includes:

Riparian trees

- Sequoia sempervirens – Coast Redwood
- Thuja plicata – Western Redcedar
- Abies grandis – grand fir
- Picea sitchensis – Sitka Spruce
- Chamaecyparis lawsoniana – Port Orford-cedar
- Taxus brevifolia – Pacific Yew
- Populus fremontii – Fremont Cottonwood
- Populus trichocarpa – Black Cottonwood
- Platanus racemosa – California Sycamore
- Alnus rhombifolia – White Alder
- Alnus rubra – Red Alder
- Acer macrophyllum – Big-leaf Maple
- Fraxinus latifolia – Oregon ash
- Prunus emarginata – Bitter Cherry
- Salix lasiolepis – Arroyo Willow
- Salix lucida – Pacific Willow
- Quercus agrifolia – Coast live oak
- Quercus garryana – Garry oak
- Populus tremuloides – Quaking Aspen
- Umbellularia californica – California Bay Laurel
- Cornus nuttallii – Pacific Dogwood

Riparian shrubs

- Acer circinatum – Vine Maple
- Ribes spp. – Gooseberies and Currants
- Rosa pisocarpa – Swamp Rose or Cluster Rose
- Symphoricarpos albus – Snowberry
- Spiraea douglasii – Douglas spirea
- Rubus spp. – Blackberries, Raspberries, Thimbleberry, Salmonberry
- Rhododendron occidentale – Western Azalea
- Oplopanax horridus – Devil's Club
- Oemleria cerasiformis – Indian Plum, Osoberry
- Lonicera involucrata – Twinberry
- Cornus stolonifera – Red-osier Dogwood
- Salix spp. – Willows

Other plants

- Polypodium – Polypody Ferns
- Polystichum – Sword Ferns
- Woodwardia – Giant Chain Ferns
- Pteridium – Goldback Ferns
- Dryopteris – Wood Ferns
- Adiantum – Maidenhair Ferns
- Carex spp. – Sedges
- Juncus spp. – Rushes
- Festuca californica – California Fescue bunchgrass
- Leymus condensatus – Giant Wildrye bunchgrass
- Melica californica – California Melic bunchgrass
- Mimulus spp. – Monkeyflower and varieties
- Aquilegia spp. – Columbine

== Asia ==
In Asia there are different types of riparian vegetation, but the interactions between hydrology and ecology are similar as occurs in other geographic areas.

- Carex spp. – Sedges
- Juncus spp. – Rushes

== Australia ==
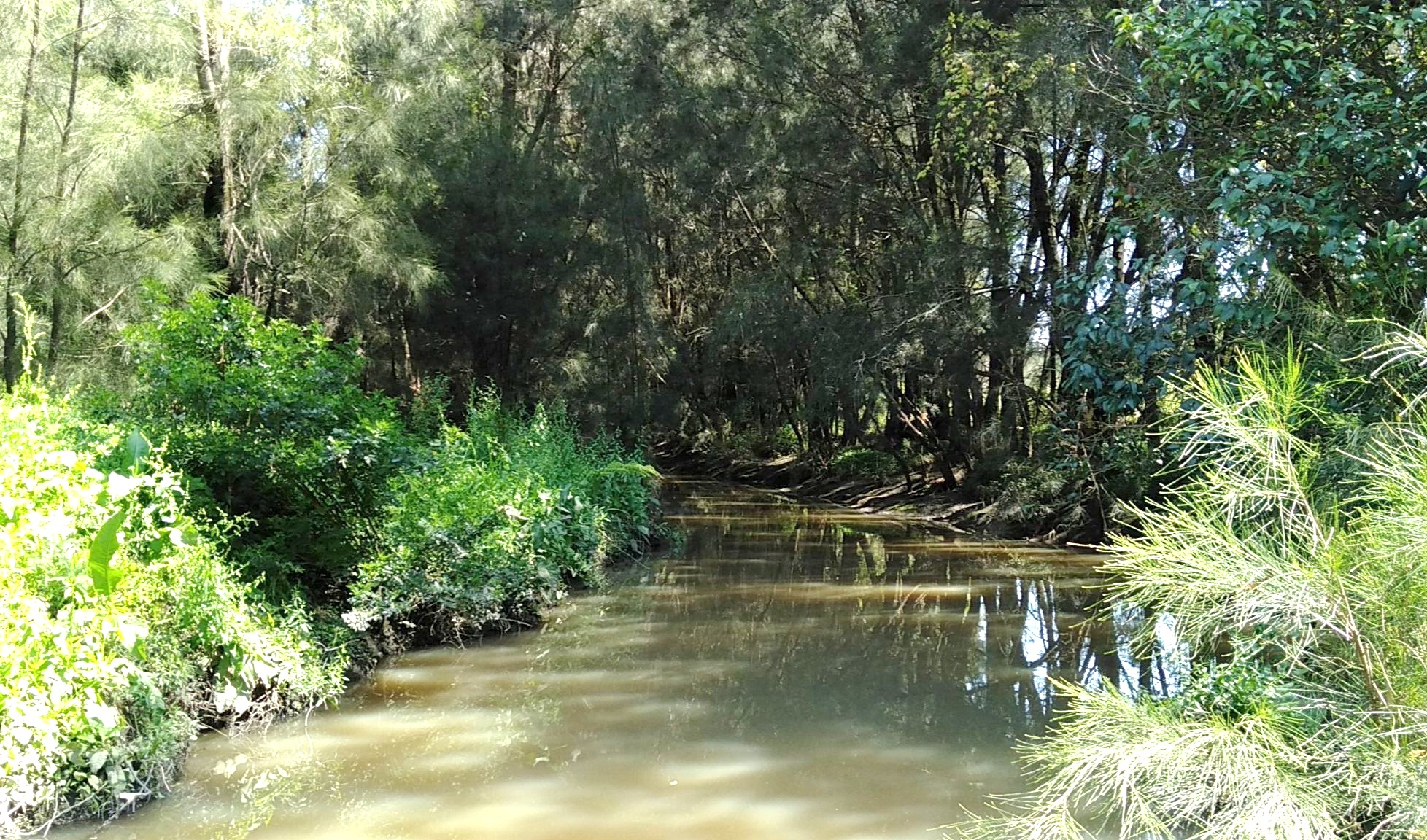
A riparian zone in Western Sydney

Typical riparian vegetation in temperate New South Wales, Australia include:

- Acacia melanoxylon – Blackwood
- Acacia pravissima – Ovens Wattle
- Acacia rubida – Red Stem Wattle
- Bursaria lasiophylla – Blackthorn
- Callistemon citrinus – Crimson Bottlebrush
- Callistemon sieberi – River Bottlebrush
- Casuarina cunninghamiana – River She-Oak
- Eucalyptus bridgesiana – Apple box
- Eucalyptus camaldulensis – River red gum
- Eucalyptus melliodora – yellow box
- Eucalyptus viminalis – manna gum
- Kunzea ericoides – Burgan
- Leptospermum obovatum – river tea-tree
- Melaleuca ericifolia – swamp paperbark

== Central Europe ==
Typical riparian zone trees in Central Europe include:

- Acer campestre – Field Maple
- Acer pseudoplatanus – Sycamore Maple
- Alnus glutinosa – Black Alder
- Carpinus betulus – European Hornbeam
- Fraxinus excelsior – European Ash
- Juglans regia – Persian Walnut
- Malus sylvestris – European Wild Apple
- Populus alba – White Poplar
- Populus nigra – Black Poplar
- Quercus robur – Pedunculate Oak
- Salix alba – White Willow
- Salix fragilis – Crack Willow
- Tilia cordata – Small-leaved Lime
- Ulmus laevis – European White Elm
- Ulmus minor – Field Elm

== Repair and restoration ==
Land clearing followed by floods can quickly erode a riverbank, taking valuable grasses and soils downstream, and later allowing the sun to bake the land dry. Riparian zones can be restored through relocation (of human-made products), rehabilitation, and time. Natural Sequence Farming techniques have been used in the Upper Hunter Valley of New South Wales, Australia, in an attempt to restore eroded farms to optimum productivity rapidly.

The Natural Sequence Farming technique involves placing obstacles in the water's pathway to lessen the energy of a flood and help the water to deposit soil and seep into the flood zone. Another technique is to quickly establish ecological succession by encouraging fast-growing plants such as "weeds" (pioneer species) to grow. These may spread along the watercourse and cause environmental degradation, but may stabilize the soil, place carbon into the ground, and protect the land from drying. The weeds will improve the streambeds so trees and grasses can return and, ideally, replace the weeds. There are several other techniques used by government and non-government agencies to address riparian and streambed degradation, ranging from the installation of bed control structures such as log sills to the use of pin groynes or rock emplacement. Other possible approaches include control of invasive species, monitoring of herbivore activity, and cessation of human activity in a particular zone followed by natural re-vegetation. Conservation efforts have also encouraged incorporating the value of ecosystem services provided by riparian zones into management plans, as these benefits have traditionally been absent in the consideration and designing of these plans.

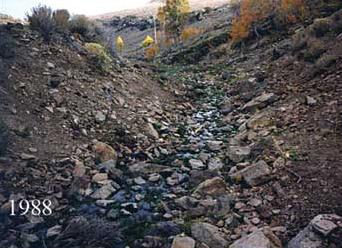
Cottonwood Creek riparian area in southeastern Oregon before restoration, 1988

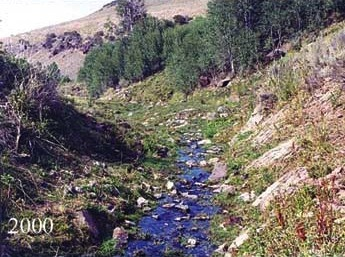
Cottonwood Creek riparian area during recovery, 2000

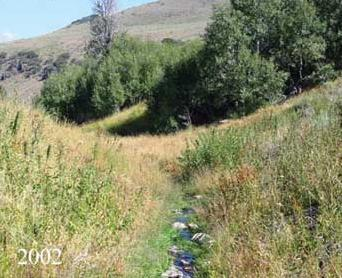
Cottonwood Creek riparian area after restoration, 2002

== See also ==
- Accropode – Concrete breakwater element
- Aquatic ecosystem – Ecosystem in a body of water
- Bioswale – Landscape elements designed to manage surface runoff water
- Bosque – Type of forest found along rivers in the Southwest United States
- Canebrake – Thicket of any of a variety of Arundinaria grasses
- Constructed wetland – Artificial wetland to treat wastewater, greywater or stormwater runoff
- Endorheic basin – Closed drainage basin that has no outflow
- Flood-meadow – Land adjacent to a river subject to seasonal flooding
- Floodplain – Land adjacent to a water body which is flooded during periods of high water
- Freshwater swamp forest – Forest growing on an alluvial zone
- Gallery forest – Type of riparian forest in dry regions
- Green belt – Largely undeveloped, wild, or agricultural land surrounding urban areas
- Marsh – Low-lying and seasonally waterlogged land
- Outwelling – Excess nutrients produced by salt marshes
- Riparian forest – Forested or wooded area of land adjacent to a body of water
- Riparian water rights – Property rights adjacent to waterways
- Riparian-zone restoration – Ecological restoration of river banks and floodplains
- Riprap – Rock or concrete protective armour
- Várzea forest – Seasonal floodplain forest inundated by whitewater rivers in the Amazon biome
- Vernal pool – Seasonal pools of water that provide habitat
- Vulnerable waters
- Water-meadow – Artificially irrigated meadow
- Wetland – Ecosystem that is flooded or saturated with water
