= Legacy sediment =

Sediment

Legacy sediment (LS) refers to depositional bodies of sediment inherited from the increase of human activities since the Neolithic. These include a broad range of land use and land cover changes, such as agricultural clearance, lumbering and clearance of native vegetation, mining, road building, and urbanization, as well as alterations brought to river systems in the form of dams and other engineering structures meant to control and regulate natural fluvial processes (erosion, deposition, lateral migration, meandering). The concept of LS is used in geomorphology, ecology, as well as in water quality and toxicological studies.

LS is distributed in spatially heterogeneous ways throughout a landscape and accumulates to form various landforms. It can progress through the fluvial system through facies changes from hillslope colluvium, to floodplain and wetland alluvium, to fine-grained lacustrine and estuarine slackwater deposits. The temporal nature of LS is time-transgressive, meaning that initiation and peak rates of deposition can take place at different times within a fluvial system, as well as at different times between regions. The intermittent transport of LS can be thought of as a cascading system that reworks LS deposits from hillslopes, into channels and onto floodplains, such that anthropogenic sediment will be mixed with and non-anthropogenic sediment.

River systems record past and present imprints of anthropogenically-forced changes to the environment. LS is an element of change in this context, as it drives fluxes of energy and matter (connectivity) through fluvial systems and provides indication of past land-uses and river dynamics that can inform future trajectories of river response. In this sense, acknowledging the concept of LS can benefit informed policy development in stream restoration, water quality and sediment budget management, protection of aquatic ecosystems, and flood risk. Moreover, the implications of legacy effects associated with anthropogenically modified sediment dynamics are critical in the context of ecosystem services.

== Definitions ==
=== Post-settlement alluvium ===
Definitions predominantly indicate post-settlement alluvium North America created as a result of agricultural clearance.

"Legacy Sediment (n.) Are sediments that (1) were eroded from upland slopes during several centuries of intensive land clearing, agriculture, and milling (in the eastern U.S., this occurred from the late 17th to late 19th Centuries); (2) collected along stream corridors and valley bottoms, burying pre-settlement streams, floodplains, wetlands, and dry valleys; and that altered the hydrologic, biologic, aquatic, riparian, and chemical functions of pre-settlement streams and floodplains; (3) accumulated behind ubiquitous low-head mill dams in slackwater environments, resulting in thick accumulations of fine-grained sediment, which distinguishes legacy sediment from fluvial deposits associated with meandering streams; (4) can also accumulate as coarser grained, more poorly sorted colluvial (not associated with stream transport) deposits, usually at valley margins; (5) can contain varying amounts of total phosphorus and nitrogen, which contribute to nutrient loads in downstream waterways from bank erosion processes. . ."

=== Anthropogenically-caused episodic sedimentary deposits ===
As a result of criticism related to the limited scope and applicability of this definition, a more flexible and generic definition has been proposed that (1) includes a broader range of human activities, (2) considers more sediment types apart from post-settlement alluvium, and (3) respects the spatial (nonuniform) and temporal (time-transgressive) variability of LS:

"Legacy sediment: Earth materials—primarily alluvium [or colluvium]—deposited following human disturbances such as deforestation, agricultural land use, or mining. The phrase is often used to describe post-European floodplain sediments, also known as post settlement alluvium. Awareness of legacy sediment has grown in response to the importance it plays in sediment budgets, water quality, river restoration, toxicity, lateral channel connectivity, and geomorphic theory. . ."

"Legacy sediment is primarily alluvium [and colluvium] that was deposited following human disturbances in a watershed. The disturbance may have been in the form of deforestation, plowing agricultural land, mining, or other land-use changes. In North America and Australia, legacy sediments are ubiquitous and represent episodic erosion in response to the colonization of land by European settlers who introduced Old World land- clearance technologies (e.g. steel tools and plows pulled by draft animals) and export economies. In these settings, legacy sediments are often described as post-settlement alluvium (PSA), which may cover entire floodplains and bury the pre- settlement soil with a thick mantle of relatively young stratified sediment."

== Types and related landforms ==
=== Types ===
LS encompasses sediment of differing structures and textures. They can be colluvial, containing poorly sorted, angular rock fragments deposited by mass wasting or sheet erosional processes, alluvial, containing well sorted, rounded clasts and very-fine grained suspended sediment deposited by fluvial processes.

=== Associated landforms ===
Most LS is generated on highlands by erosional processes related to mass-wasting, sheet flow, rills and gullies. The deposited colluvium has a low travel distance and accumulates in midslope drapes near the site of erosion, in aprons or sediment wedges at the base of the slope or in fans at the mouth of gullies, debris flows and tributaries.

Floodplains store alluvium through lateral and vertical accretion, i.e. bedload deposits are being incorporated into the floodplain. Depositional episodes reflect the balance between the amount of sediments available and the capacity for it to be transported. Accordingly, the nature of LS on floodplains can be of different nature: (1) graded, when an excess of sediment and a deficit in transport capacity buries floodplains in continuous deposits, (2) cascading, when abundant sediment and limited transport capacity results in a series of frequent, but separated pockets, (3) punctuated, when limited sediment supply but efficient transport leads to deposition only in locally isolated pockets.

In low energy environments like lakes, wetlands, estuaries, LS are dominated by very fine-grained material, such as silts and clays, and form beaches and beach-dune complexes.

=== Source to sink relationships ===
Another way to conceptualize the spatial pattern of LS throughout a watershed is through the notion of source and storage or sink zones. Stores differentiate themselves from sinks through their temporal persistence in the landscape, the first being temporary, while the second are more long-lasting. Highlands are characterized by local storage points near the sediment production zone, with larger storage spaces downstream in wider valleys with low gradients. Stores in this parts of a watershed have generally low residence times, as they are episodically reworked by the fluvial system. Sources are linked to sinks through transport or transfer zones, generally characterized by either high transport capacity or little accommodation space for sediment to accumulate in, e.g. steep narrow valleys that are highly effective in transferring sediment downstream. Sinks are most common in low-lying, low gradient areas where flow energy is dissipated across large surfaces, so that accumulation is dominant. Here, storage space and residence time of the deposits increases considerably relative to upstream parts of a watershed.

== Legacy effects ==
Scientific studies documenting the widespread alteration of sediment dynamics (i.e. sediment supply, sediment entrainment, transport, erosion, deposition and storage) by humans lead to the evidence that human activities have come to dominate erosional, depositional and geochemical processes in ecosystems. This is especially pronounced in river systems, given that rivers are the lowest topographic points of any landscape and consequently collect water, solutes, mineral sediment and particulate organic matter from the landscape, but also precipitation, solutes and particulates from the atmosphere. Furthermore, increased sediment supply to rivers but reduced sediment transport within a fluvial network resulted in the creation of legacy effects along almost all rivers across the world. For example, even though accelerated anthropogenic soil erosion has increased sediment transport of rivers across the globe by 2.3 (± 0.6) billion metric tons per year, sediment delivery to the world's coasts and oceans has been reduced by 1.4 (± 0.3) billion metric tons per year because of retention within reservoirs. More than 50% of the major watersheds over the world are impacted by dams. In the United States alone, it is estimated that only 2% of river kilometers are not affected by dams.

Human activities lead to legacy effects on river sediments, which manifest themselves as changes to the location, amount and composition of sediments. Legacy effects are temporally and spatially variable and the resulting sediment have varying spatial extents, accumulation rates and residence times within a river system. For example, removal of beaver dams may initially cause local sedimentation within a portion of basin that comprises solely a few hectares. Similarly, one milldam constructed within a river enhances deposition of sediment over several hectares. Conversely, construction of hundreds of kilometers of bank revetment structures, such as levees, has a much more extensive impact across a basin of nearly eliminating overbank sedimentation. Likewise, removal of native vegetation within an upland region of a basin may lead to significant aggradation of valley bottoms along almost the entire course of a river network. Wastewater treatment can remove contaminated sediment within less than a year, but heavy metals and synthetic chemicals may remain within river sediments at toxic standards for decades to centuries.

Three main effects of anthropogenic manipulation of ecosystems are to enhance sedimentation, to reduce or eliminate sedimentation and/or to contaminate sediments with various pollutants.

=== Enhanced sedimentation ===
Sedimentation is enhanced by activities that either increase sediment supply to the river from upstream (e.g. agricultural clearing, mining, grazing) or other parts of the watershed or decrease the transport capacity of the river (e.g. flow regulation).

The effects thereof may induce river metamorphosis, i.e. a whole-shift alteration of river morphology. For example, changing crops from grains to potatoes in late 19th century Poland resulted in such increased sediment yields, that meandering rivers metamorphosed into braided rivers. Copper mining in the headwaters of the Ok Tedi River in Papua New Guinea generated about 80 thousand tonnes per day of waste tailings and 121 thousand tonnes per day of mined wasted rock, which were discarded in the river and affected the entire course of the river network, as well as the nearshore environment. The river system responded by aggrading over 6 meters in parts of the basin a decade later. In California, the Bear River still continues to rework and move down sediment generated by mining activities more than a century after these stopped.

Indirectly, climate change can also enhance sedimentation through changes in precipitation and discharge patterns, which have been shown to result in increased mass movements, alterations of wildfire regimes and increased glacial melting.

=== Reduced sedimentation ===
Sedimentation is reduced or removed altogether when human activities reduce sediment yields from upstream (e.g. dams and reservoirs within upland regions, sediment detention basins) or reduce the river channel's physical complexity (e.g. channelization, drainage) or disconnect river channels from adjacent floodplains and wetlands (e.g. levees, removal of beaver dams and logjams/large woody debris).

Rapid dam construction in the Mekong River system resulted in 38 dams (as of 2014) and an additional 133 proposed for the main stream and its tributary streams – if all of these were to be constructed, the overall sediment trapping capacity would be 96%. Estimates show that about 100 billion metric tons of sediment are presently stored in reservoirs that have been constructed over the past 50 years. Levee construction in the lower Mississippi River reduced overbank flows by 90%. Bank stabilization measures associated with this project reduced bank erosion and meander lateral migration, while dikes induced bed scour during low flows due to increased flow velocity. Overall, this project lead to a decrease of sediment storage on the floodplain from 89,600 to 7,000 square kilometers between 1882–2000. In Australia's Cann River, wood removal from the channel transformed downstream segments of the river network from a sediment sink to a sediment source.

=== Contaminated sedimentation ===
Human activities introduce or concentrate naturally occurring (e.g. nitrogen, phosphorus) or synthetic contaminants and pollutants that get absorbed in sediments and may lead, at toxic levels, to chronic or severe disruption of physiologic mechanisms in all organisms. The most common contaminants that can absorb fine sediment are trace metals, nutrients (e.g. nitrogen, phosphorus), polynuclear aromatic hydrocarbons (PAHs), pathogens, polychlorinated biphenyls (PCBs), pesticides, volatile organic compounds (VOCs).

For instance, two tailing dams of gold mines located in Romanian tributaries of the Danube failed, thereby releasing vast amounts of cyanide-contaminated water and sediment for tens of kilometers downstream, which killed riverine organisms and affected human drinking-water supply for weeks. In the Rio San Juan basin of Peru, acid mine drainage was diverted into a natural lake, leading to extremely high concentrations copper, zinc and lead in the lake sediments. Samples taken by the USGS during 1993-2003 showed that median concentrations of nitrogen and phosphorus in agricultural streams are six times greater than background levels and that, across the US, concentrations in streams commonly lie above levels recommended by the US Environmental Protection Agency in order to protect aquatic life.

== See also ==
- Great Raft
- Vulnerable waters
