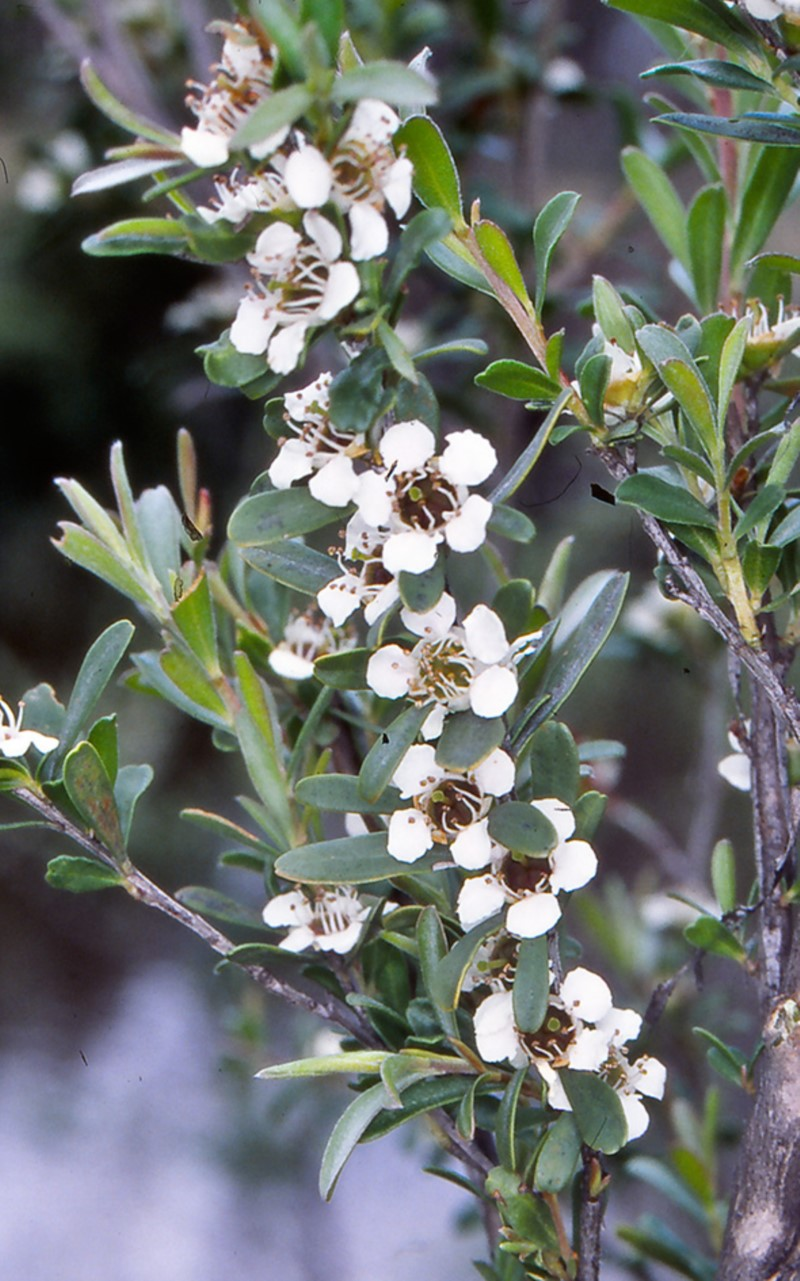
- Leptospermum obovatum in Namadgi National Park

Scientific classification
- Kingdom: Plantae
- Clade: Tracheophytes
- Clade: Angiosperms
- Clade: Eudicots
- Clade: Rosids
- Order: Myrtales
- Family: Myrtaceae
- Genus: Leptospermum
- Species: L. obovatum

Binomial name
- Leptospermum obovatum Sweet

Synonyms
- Leptospermum flavescens f. obovatum (Sweet) F.Muell. ex Siebert & Voss; Leptospermum flavescens var. obovatum (Sweet) F.Muell. ex Benth.; Leptospermum polygalifolium var. obovatum (Sweet) Domin

= Leptospermum obovatum =

River teatree

Species of plant

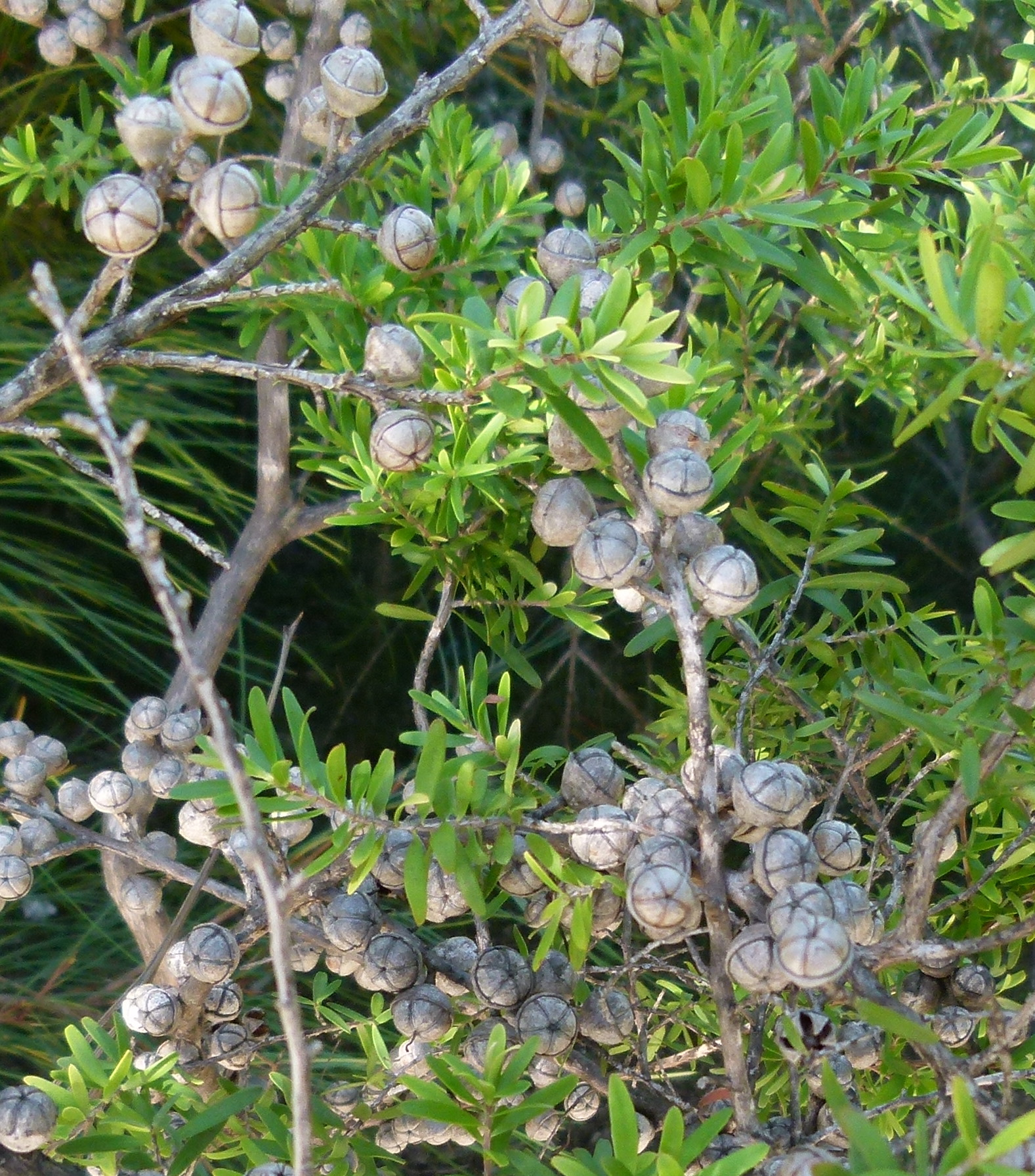
Fruit in the Jardí Botànic de Barcelona

Leptospermum obovatum, commonly known as river teatree, is a species of shrub that is endemic to south-eastern continental Australia. It has egg-shaped or lance-shaped leaves that are narrower at the base, white flowers usually arranged singly on short side shoots and fruit that remains on the plant until it dies.

== Description ==
Leptospermum obovatum is a densely foliaged shrub that typically grows to a height of about 2 m (6 ft 7 in) with thin, firm bark on the older stems. It has aromatic, egg-shaped or lance-shaped leaves that are narrower at the base, 5–20 mm (0.20–0.79 in) long and 2–8 mm (0.079–0.315 in) or more wide on a very short petiole. The flowers are borne singly, sometimes in pairs on short side shoots. The flowers are white, 8–12 mm (0.31–0.47 in) wide with reddish brown bracts at the base of the flower bud but that fall before the flowers open. The floral cup is glabrous, 2.5–3.5 mm (0.098–0.138 in) long on a short pedicel. The sepals are triangular to broadly egg-shaped or almost round, 2–2.5 mm (0.079–0.098 in) long, the petals 3–4 mm (0.12–0.16 in) long and the stamens 2–2.5 mm (0.079–0.098 in) long. Flowering mainly occurs from November to January and the fruit is a broadly hemispherical capsule 5–8 mm (0.20–0.31 in) in diameter and that remains on the plant until it dies, the sepal remnants having fallen.

== Taxonomy and naming ==
Leptospermum obovatum was first formally described by in 1827 Robert Sweet in his book Flora Australasica. The specific epithet (obovatum) is a Latin word meaning "obovate".

== Distribution and habitat ==
River teatree grows among rocks, near swift-flowing streams and often in swampy places. It is found on the Southern Tablelands and South Coast of New South Wales and is widespread in southern Victoria.

== Use in horticulture ==
This species can be grown from seed or from cuttings and is hardy in cultivation. It will grow in heavy shade, is frost hardy, and a useful screening plant.
