= Vulnerable waters =

Vulnerable waters refer to geographically isolated wetlands (GIWs) and to ephemeral and intermittent streams. Ephemeral and intermittent streams are seasonally flowing and are located in headwater position. They are the outer and smallest stems of hydrological networks. Isolated wetlands are located outside floodplain and show poor surface connection to tributaries or floodplains. Geographically isolated wetlands encompass saturated depressions that are the result of fluvial, aeolian, glacial and/or coastal geomorphological processes. They may be natural landforms or the result of human interventions. Vulnerable waters represent the major proportion of river networks.

These water bodies show vulnerability to natural and human disturbances because they are poorly hydrologically connected, and they are often located in the gray zone of countries and states' protected water regulatory frameworks. In the US, the protection status of GIWs and ephemeral/intermittent streams in regard to the Clean Water Act is being revised. In the context of European Union (EU) Water Framework Directive (WFD), small headwater streams are neglected, especially in agricultural setting.

These water bodies play an essential hydrological and ecological role at the local-to catchment scale. They control storage of water, sediment in the drainage network, increase sediment filtering and biochemical transformation. Furthermore, vulnerable waters contribute to increases in landscape biodiversity as they serve as refuge to endemic species and conduits for migration. Headwater streams and isolated wetlands shows hydrological and ecological connectivity through intermittent surface processes and groundwater processes.

== Definition, types and distribution of vulnerable waters ==
=== Ephemeral and intermittent headwater streams ===
Headwater streams refer to the smallest channels of a river network, where streamflow begins. They are considered first- to third-order streams in the Strahler 's stream classification system. The designation of intermittent and ephemeral stream refers to the continuum of streamflow within a year. An ephemeral stream flows episodically, following a precipitation event, while an intermittent stream flow continuously during a portion of the year. In both cases, the drying of the channel results from the local water table declining below the bed surface. The majority of ephemeral and intermittent streams are in headwater positions, but in lowland settings, small tributaries along the river network can be ephemeral or intermittent.

=== Geographically-isolated wetlands (GIWs) ===
Geographically isolated wetlands (GIWs) are wetlands entirely surrounded by uplands. GIWs receive water from adjacent uplands and precipitation. However, no stream of any type supplies water to GIWs. Despite GIWs having poor hydrological connectivity with stream networks, they can exhibit subsurface connectivity or even temporary surface-water outflows toward other wetlands or streams. GIWs lacking complete surface or subsurface hydrological connectivity with any water body will lose water mainly by evapotranspiration or to groundwater that is not connected to a stream network. Despite the absence of hydrological connectivity, they can exhibit biological and chemical connectivity with fluvial systems.

==== Non-floodplain wetlands ====
GIWs that are hydrologically connected (by subsurface connection or temporary surface connection) can be considered non-floodplain wetlands. Non-floodplain wetlands are located outside floodplains and display a unidirectional hydrological connectivity with streams, meaning the water is flowing only toward streams located at lower elevations. Hydrological connectivity between non-floodplain wetlands and streams occurs through surface or subsurface processes. Surface connections can be ephemeral and intermittent streams.

=== Morphological classification ===
In the US, the natural types of GIWS are: prairie pothole wetlands, playas, Nebraska's Rainwater Basin and Sandhills wetlands, West Coast vernal pools, sinkhole wetlands, Carolina bays, intradunal and interdunal wetlands, desert springs, endorheic basin in the Great Basin, and kettle-hole in glaciated regions.

Non-floodplain wetlands are classified in three categories which include GIWs: depressional wetlands, slope wetlands and flats wetlands. Depressional wetlands occur in topographic depressions with or without surface outlets. Depressional wetlands include kettle holes, potholes, vernal pools, playas lake and Carolina bays. Slope wetlands are located along hillslopes and are mainly recharged by groundwater inputs. Fens are the usual type of slope wetlands. Flats wetlands occur on large flat areas like interfluve, dried lake bottoms or large floodplain terraces. Large playas are a type of mineral soil-dominated flats. Flats wetlands can also be formed from organic soils, like peatbogs.

GIWs and non-floodplain wetlands can emerge from one or a combination of geomorphological processes: aeolian (potholes, playas, Rainwater basin, Carolina Bays, interdunal wetlands), (peri-)glacial (kettle, fens), karstic (sinkholes) and lacustrine (Carolina Bays, endorheic basin).

=== Relative abundance of vulnerable waters ===
Ephemeral and intermittent headwater streams and GIWs display the shortest drainage area and stream length, but together they can represent the major proportion of river networks and watersheds.

In the U.S., headwater streams represent more than 60% of the river network length and geographically isolated wetlands encompass about 16% of freshwater resources. In 17 states, there are streams with an intermittent-stream-length-over-total-length's ratio higher than 82%. North Dakota, South Dakota and Minnesota are the three states with the most hectares of geographically isolated wetlands. Many studies report that actual maps of U.S. hydrographic network underestimate the distribution of headwater streams

The approximate length of first to third order streams in the world is respectively 45 660 000, 22 061 000 and 10 660 100 km, and they represent the dominant Strahler' order of streams in the world.

== Vulnerable water legal status ==
The legal status of ephemeral and intermittent headwater streams and GIWs differ from one legislation to another.

=== United States ===
In the US, Environmental Protection Agency (EPA) has, since 1972, the responsibility to regulate the waters of the United States, under the Clean Water Act (CWA). The Clean Water Act, introduced by president Richard Nixon, made clear that continental waters should be "swimmable and fishable" for the American public. That was a great step toward protection of riverine habitats and improvement of water quality.

Because of the U.S Constitution, the federal government can only protect interstate waters that is used for navigation, which is defined as the "waters of the United States" (WOTUS). From 1972 to 2015, the EPA defined WOTUS as:

"`[...] traditional navigable waters, interstate waters (including interstate wetlands), all other waters that could affect interstate or foreign commerce, impoundments of waters of the United States, tributaries, the territorial seas, and adjacent wetlands" (CWA, (33 CFR 328.3; 40 CFR 122.2)

The CWA defined wetlands as:

"[...] areas that are inundated or saturated by surface or ground water at a frequency and duration sufficient to support, and that under normal circumstances do support, a prevalence of vegetation typically adapted for life in saturated soil conditions. Wetlands generally include swamps, marshes, bogs, and similar areas." (CWA, section 404).

The definition of WOTUS was challenged in court several times, especially regarding the integration of isolated wetlands, but until the years 2000, the U.S. Federal Court stood by the initial definition saying that floodplain wetlands are bound to the streams they are adjacent to. Then, In 2001, a judgement ruled that isolated wetlands are not comprised in the WOTUS definition because they do not show "significant nexus" with navigable streams. In 2006, in the Rapanos vs. United States case, further confusion was created concerning the WOTUS definition. No majority decision was obtained, as two main opinions divided the judges. The first one, defended by Justice Antonin Scalia, was that the scope of the CWA only included permanent streams and wetlands with a significant surface connections with navigable streams. The second opinion, led by Justice Anthony Kennedy, was that waters have a significant nexus with navigable waters if they are significantly affecting their chemical, physical, and biological integrity.

The definition of WOTUS is actually under revision. The United States President, Donald Trump, signed the executive Order 13778 (82 FR 12495, March 3, 2017), asking the EPA and United States Army Corps of Engineers Corps to review the definition of WOTUS in a manner that is consistent with Justice Antonin Scalia's opinion. This opinion calls for protection of permanent waters and wetlands showing surface connections to relatively permanent waters, which exclude GIWS, and ephemeral/intermittent streams.

=== European Union ===
In the European Union (EU), since 2000, the Water Framework Directive (WFD) aims to achieve a number of objectives to improve water quality of lakes, rivers and coastal areas. Key objectives are general protection of the aquatic ecosystem, protection of drinking water resources, and protection of swimmable waters. These objectives are realized through river management measures at basin scale. The WFD requires the delineation of water bodies that will be targeted for specific diagnosis and management measures. The smallest area range considered to identify those water bodies is 10 to 100 km square. Due to their small size, headwater streams are not usually identified as one of the water bodies targeted by the WFD and, therefore, become more vulnerable to human activities.

== Ecological functions ==
The U.S. Environmental Protection Agency (EPA) classifies headwater streams (including ephemeral/intermittent streams) and GIWs' ecological functions in five categories: source, sink, refuge, transformation and lag functions. These functions depend on the level of connectivity (hydrological, sedimentological, biological) in-between the sub-components of a river system (channel, floodplain, wetlands). Many functions are common among streams riverine wetlands and non-floodplain wetlands. Many more studies have been conducted on the role of headwater streams compared to GIWs.

=== Source function ===
Headwaters streams and GIWs represent the dominant sources of material and energy in river networks. They export water, sediment, nutrients, organic debris and organisms from the upland areas to the downstream portion of the river network.

Headwater streams are the dominant source of water in a river network. They supply water downstream that is essential to aquatic habitats. They contribute to flooding, and in doing so transfer sediments and nutrients to adjacent riverine habitats. Headwater streams are also typically erosion zones. They collect sediment from bank erosion and from colluvium in mountainous areas. Sediment inputs from headwater streams influence the dynamic equilibrium between runoff discharge and transport capacity, responsible for aggradation and degradation of channels. Headwater streams also collect wood, organic matter, nutrients and fine particles through erosion and flooding of riverine wetlands. Headwater streams provide rich-nutrient waters that benefit micro-organisms, like algae and invertebrates. For example, it was demonstrated that first-order streams contribute to 40% of nitrogen reaching fourth and fifth-order streams. It was also demonstrated that headwater streams are sources of invertebrates that benefit the whole food chain downstream: salmonidae are a good example of species that benefit. Headwater streams supply organic matter downstream that is essential to physical and biological processes throughout the river network. They also deliver wood logs and wood debris that exert an influence over channel morphology, runoff velocity and on the spatial distribution of ecological habitats.

GIWs can be the source of headwater streams. GIWs can provide the major proportion of stream's water in dry period. However, the process of water transfer from a GIWs to a stream is depending on antecedent moisture conditions prevailing in the GIWs. Under saturated conditions, GIWs will supply water to other downstream water bodies, including streams. There are abundant and diverse microbial populations in GIWs. Low pH, low salinity and presence of organic matter create favorable conditions for the development of sulfate-reducing bacteria. These bacteria are responsible for the production of methylmercury. GIWs are thus source of methylmercury, and other dissolved organic compounds and acids that can be transported downstream by temporary surface flows. Despite the fact the methylmercury is a particularly toxic pollutant, dissolved organic matter is a major source of energy for aquatic organisms located downstream in the river network.

=== Sink function ===
Sink function refers to the overall net import of energy and materials from the stream to the riparian environment or outside the stream network.

In natural settings, many exchanges of water occur between headwater streams and their riparian environments. Bed friction and friction with the riparian surface during overbank flows result in a net loss of flow energy, especially in mountainous streams with coarse bed loads. It results in net decrease of the erosion capacity of the stream in its downstream section. In the riparian zone, friction and shallow water depth contributes to decreases in flow velocity and to the deposition of suspended sediments. Meanwhile, a net loss of water from the flooded riparian environment to the atmosphere can occur through evaporation or by transpiration of vegetation. Intake of nitrogen by bacteria, as runoff water charged with nutrient penetrates the hyporheic zone, is another demonstration of headwater stream's sink function. Knight et al. (2010) determined that riverine wetlands acting as buffer are the most effective tool to mitigate the effect of non-point sources of pollution to streams.

GIWs, like riverine wetlands, can intercept nutrients and other pollutants from point-sources (ex. ditches, drainage pipes) or from diffuse (non-point) sources (ex. leaching from agricultural fields). Processes involved in capturing nutrients are various and include: the process of denitrification, phosphorus retention through plant assimilation and sorption or sedimentation processes. Removal of nutrients by GIWs has a great influence over water quality in stream networks. A study by Dierberg and Brezonik (1984) demonstrated that a forested non-floodplain wetland was responsible for removing 95% of phosphorus, nitrate, ammonium and total nitrogen after human sewage was applied. Under low-saturated conditions, GIWs will store water instead of releasing it. Storage of water and subsequent evapotranspiration will result in an overall loss of water for the stream network.

=== Refuge function ===
Refuge function refers to providing favorable conditions for many aquatic and terrestrial lifeforms.

Headwater streams and their riverine wetlands offer shelters from predation, drying, and extreme temperatures to many organisms. They provide habitats that are essential for the completion of a portion or of the full life cycle of fish species, macro-invertebrates, mammals, bird and amphibian species. Riverine wetlands display a mosaic of habitats due to the spatial heterogeneity of hydrological and morphological processes. The diversity of habitats and the abundance of food (see Source function) make riverine wetlands ideal feeding, breeding and shelter sites for fish species, amphibians and macroinvertebrates. Riverine wetlands also shelter a high diversity of plant species. Overbank flows within the floodplain are used by plants to disseminate their seeds In return, living organisms contribute to the spatial and temporal complexity of fluvial systems which is essential to maintaining a high level of connectivity between the streams and their riverine environment. For example, dams building by beaver create pools along headwater streams that eventually become suitable fish habitats and increase groundwater surface water interactions.

GIWs have been identified as breeding site for birds, fish species, mammals (muskrats, otters), amphibians and reptiles. Fish species benefit from the temporary rise of water levels and creation of surface connections to migrate from GIWs to streams or others wetlands. Mammals and bird species serve as transport vectors for the dissemination of plants seeds, algae and invertebrates.

=== Transformation function ===
Transformation function refers to the biogeochemical processing of organic and non-organic elements.

Nutrients entering headwater streams undergo many cycles of transformation through biological and chemical processes (absorption by algae, digestion by a fish, uptake by bacteria etc.). The cycling of nutrients through different forms and different compartments of the fluvial system is called "nutrient spiraling". Organic matter will also undergo cycle of transformation in headwater streams, mainly through respiration by organisms and microbes. Other processes of transformation of organic matter, like dead leaves, include immersion, physical abrasion and photodegradation. The exchanges of water through the hyporheic zone of headwater streams can also mediate the form and mobility of pollutants, hereby decreasing pollutant concentrations downstream. In riverine wetlands, a lot of transformation processes occur in which nutrients and other compounds are lost to the atmosphere or sequestered in the soil or vegetation.

Transformation of elemental mercury to methylmercury is performed by microbial communities living in acidic wetlands (see Source function). Methylmercury is a toxic form of mercury that is very mobile and that accumulates in the food chain. Denitrification is another transformation process occurring in GIWs.

=== Lag function ===
Lag function refers to the transient storage of energy and materials. Because they are the dominant sources of water in stream network, headwater streams and wetlands have a great impact on the frequency, duration and magnitude of downstream transfer of materials and energy. The intensity of the lag function is correlated to the abundance and diversity of local storage components (wetlands, alluvial aquifers, stream banks and floodplains) and to the level of connectivity between these components.

In headwaters streams, flowing water interacts with channel bedforms, stream banks and vegetation. These interactions result in reduced flow velocity and transient storage of groundwater, which lessen the flood's magnitude during heavy precipitation events. On the other end, during the dry season, the transient storage and delayed transfer of groundwater to the stream will maintain a minimum baseflow essential for aquatic species. The same process applies for sediments, nutrients and organic matter being transported downstream from the upper areas of a watershed and being temporarily stored in the floodplain, including riverine wetlands. Living organisms present in headwater streams contribute to delaying the downstream transfer of sediments, nutrients and organic matter through consumption, assimilation, and bioconsolidation.

Transient storage of water in GIWs contributes to a delay in input of precipitation water to streams or other connected water bodies. Such a function secures the base flow of streams and contributes to recharging local and regional aquifers, especially during dry periods Transient storage in GIWs contributes also to lessening flood magnitude during heavy precipitation events or during melt periods. In contrast, because storage capacity is largely determined by antecedent moisture conditions, a saturated GIWs will convey water downstream rapidly, which could increase flood magnitude. Following this idea, GIWs can also reduce base flow, through storage and evapotranspiration, when saturation conditions are low.
