= Antilles =

Archipelago bordering the north and east of the Caribbean Sea

The West Indies (red), which includes the Antilles and the Lucayan Archipelago.

The Antilles is an archipelago within the West Indies in the Caribbean region of the Americas. It is bordered by the Caribbean Sea to the south and west, the Gulf of Mexico to the northwest, and the North Atlantic Ocean to the north and east.

The Antillean islands are divided into two smaller archipelagos: the Greater Antilles and the Lesser Antilles. The Greater Antilles include the Cayman Islands and larger islands of Cuba, Hispaniola (subdivided into the nations of the Dominican Republic and Haiti), Navassa Island, Jamaica, and Puerto Rico. The Lesser Antilles contains the northerly Leeward Islands and the southeasterly Windward Islands, as well as the Leeward Antilles immediately north of Venezuela. The Lucayan Archipelago, consisting of The Bahamas and the Turks and Caicos Islands, though a part of the West Indies, is generally not included among the Antillean islands.

Geographically, the Antillean islands are generally considered a subregion of North America. Culturally speaking, Cuba, the Dominican Republic, and Puerto Rico – and sometimes the whole of the Antilles – are included in Latin America, although some sources use the phrase "Latin America and the Caribbean" instead.

In terms of geology, the Greater Antilles are mostly made up of continental rock accreted on the North American Plate from relative movement of the Caribbean Plate. The Lesser Antilles are mostly young volcanic islands created by the Lesser Antilles subduction zone.

== Etymology ==
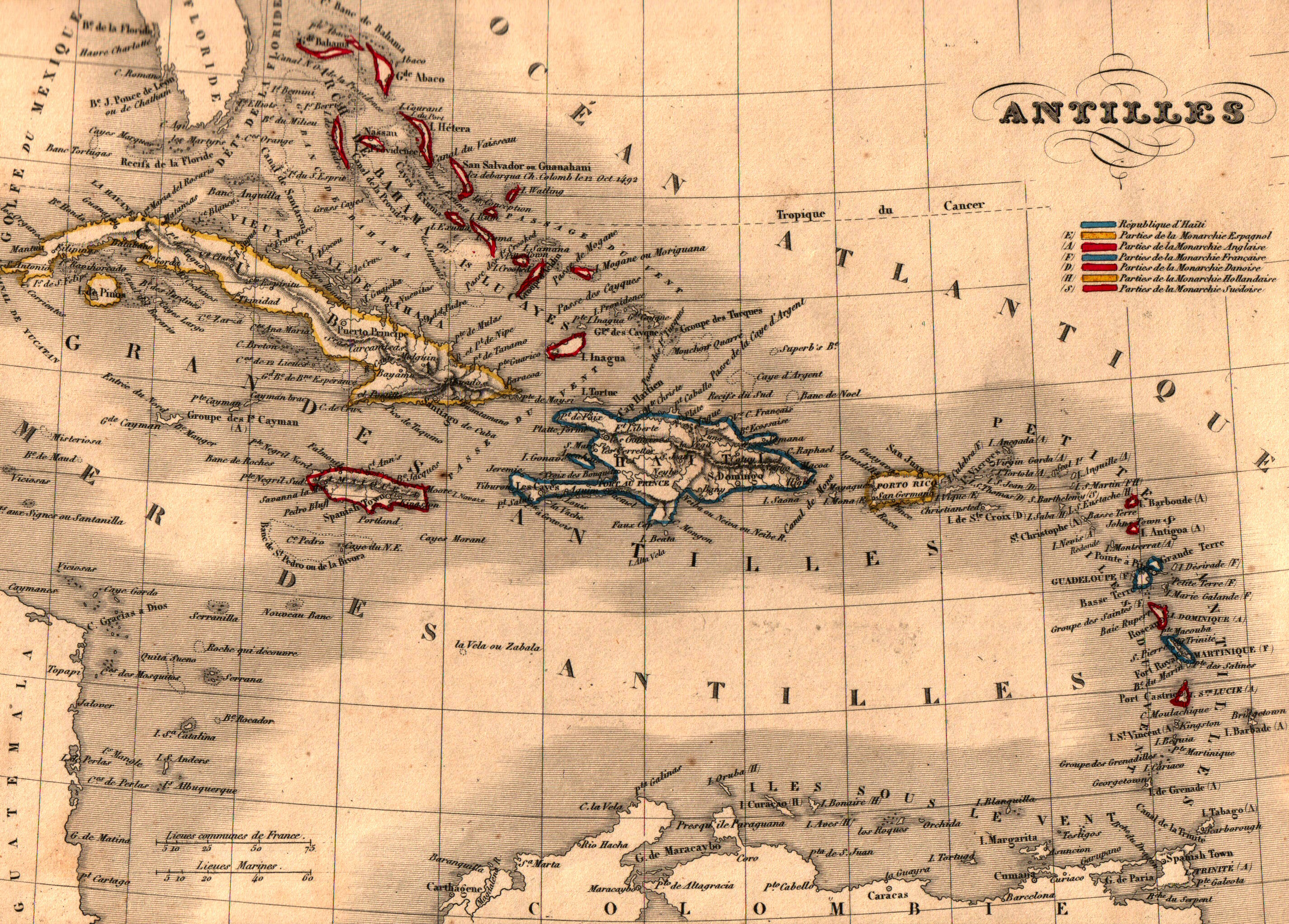
Map of Antilles / Caribbean in 1843

The word Antilles originated in the period before the European colonization of the Americas, Antilia depicted on many medieval charts, sometimes as an archipelago, sometimes as continuous land of greater or lesser extent, its location fluctuating in mid-ocean between the Canary Islands and India.

After the 1492 arrival of Christopher Columbus's expedition in what was later called the West Indies, the European powers realized that the dispersed lands constituted an extensive archipelago in the Caribbean Sea and the Gulf of Mexico. The Antilles were called multiple names before their current name became the norm. Early Spanish visitors called them the Windward Islands (today having a narrower definition). They were also called the Forward Islands by 18th-century British. Thereafter, the term Antilles was commonly assigned to the formation, and "Sea of the Antilles" became a common alternative name for the Caribbean Sea in various European languages.

== Countries and territories by subregion and archipelago ==
NASA World Wind image of the Antilles

=== Lucayan Archipelago ===
- The Bahamas
- Turks and Caicos Islands (United Kingdom)

=== Greater Antilles ===
- Cayman Islands (United Kingdom)
- Cuba
  - Isle of Youth
- Hispaniola
  - Haiti
  - Dominican Republic
- Jamaica
- Puerto Rico (United States)

=== Lesser Antilles ===
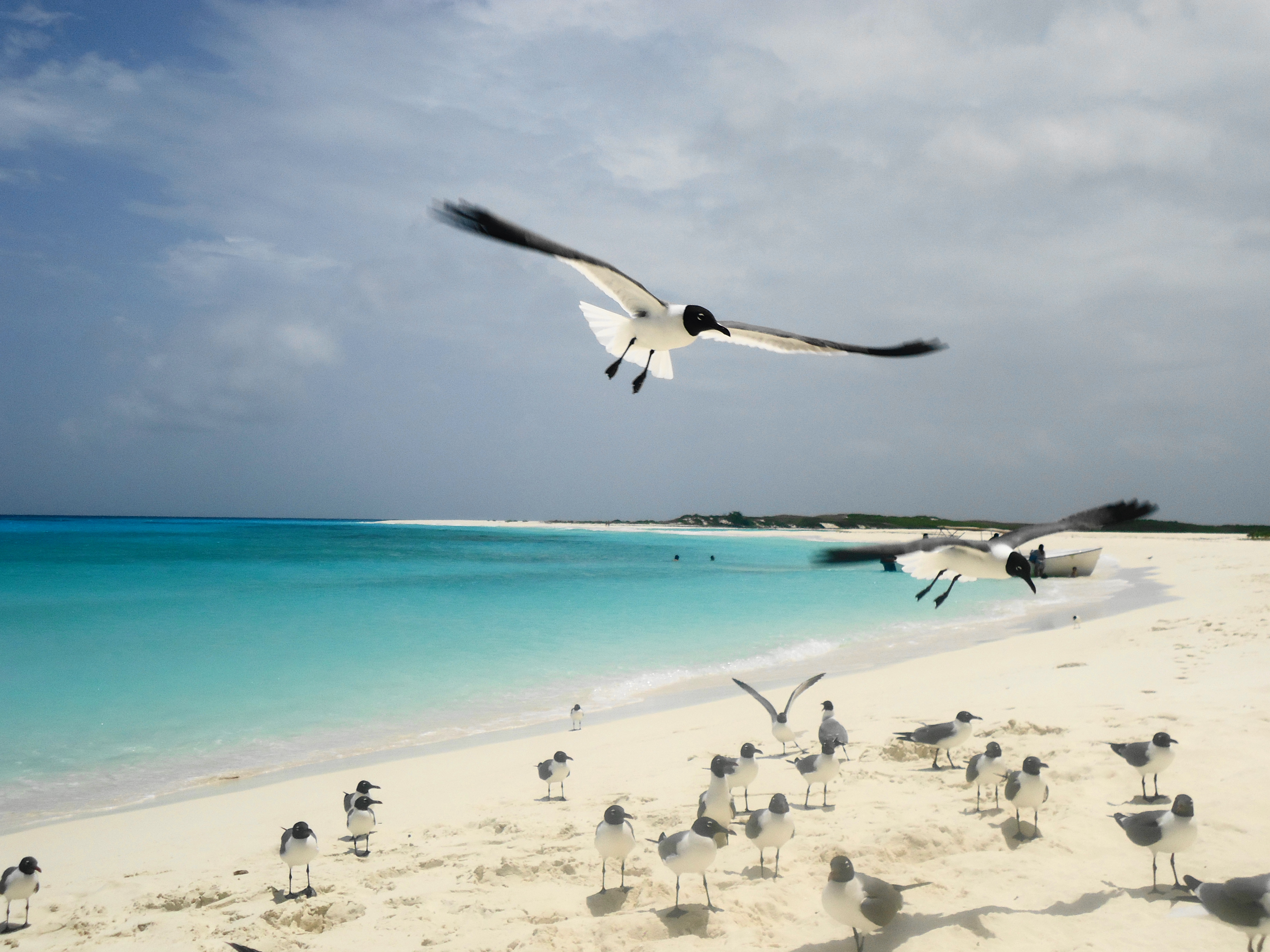
Los Roques, Venezuela, Lesser Antilles

==== Leeward Antilles ====
- Aruba (Kingdom of the Netherlands)
- Bonaire (Netherlands)
- Curaçao (Kingdom of the Netherlands)
- Federal Dependencies of Venezuela
  - Aves Island
  - Los Monjes Archipelago
  - La Tortuga Island
  - La Sola Island
  - Los Testigos Islands
  - Los Frailes Islands
  - Patos Island
  - Los Roques Archipelago
  - Blanquilla Island
  - Los Hermanos Archipelago
  - Orchila Island
  - Las Aves Archipelago
- Nueva Esparta (Venezuela)
  - Margarita Island
  - Coche
  - Cubagua

==== Leeward Islands ====
- Anguilla (United Kingdom)
- Antigua and Barbuda
  - Antigua
  - Barbuda
  - Redonda
- British Virgin Islands (United Kingdom)
- Guadeloupe (France)
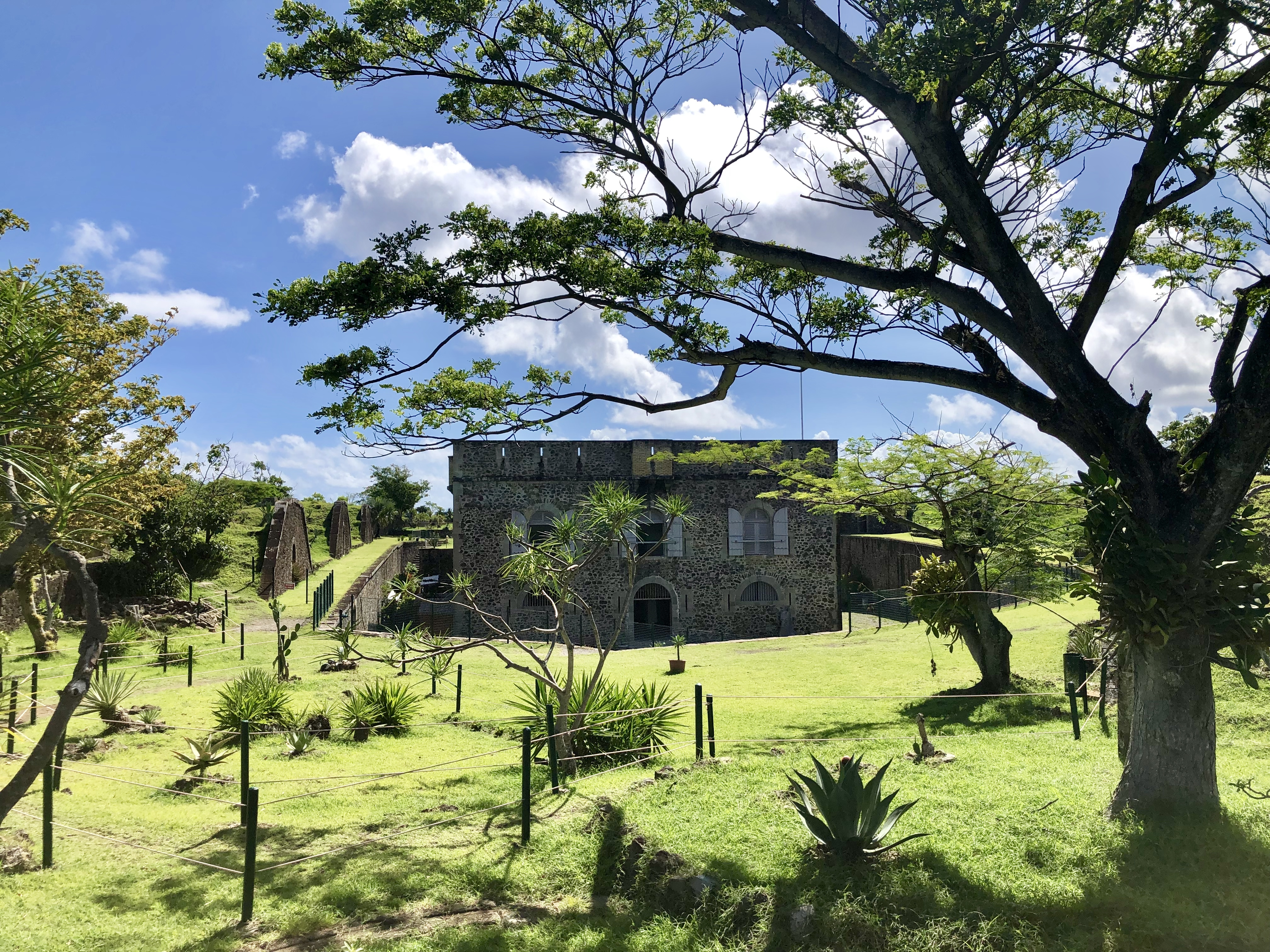
  - Fort Napoléon, Les Saintes, Guadeloupe
    La Désirade
  - Les Saintes
  - Marie-Galante
- Montserrat (United Kingdom)
- Saba (Netherlands)
- Saint Barthélemy (France)
- Saint Martin
  - Saint Martin (France)
  - Sint Maarten (Kingdom of the Netherlands)
- Saint Kitts and Nevis
  - Saint Kitts
  - Nevis
- Sint Eustatius (Netherlands)
- Spanish Virgin Islands (Puerto Rico)
- United States Virgin Islands (United States)
  - Saint Croix
  - Saint Thomas
  - Saint John

==== Windward Islands ====
- Dominica
- Grenada
- Martinique (France)
- Saint Lucia
- Saint Vincent and the Grenadines

=== Other islands ===
- Barbados
- Trinidad and Tobago
  - Trinidad
  - Tobago

== See also ==
- Antillia
