= Venezuelan Caribbean =

Mainland coast and islands

Map of Venezuela, showing its extensive coastline

The Venezuelan Caribbean consists of the coastal mainland and Caribbean islands.

== Coastal Mainland States ==
- Anzoátegui
- Aragua
- Carabobo
- Falcón
  - Paraguaná Peninsula (tied island)
- Federal Dependencies of Venezuela
  - Aves Island
  - Blanquilla Island
  - Los Frailes Islands
  - Francisco de Miranda Insular Territory
    - Las Aves Archipelago
    - La Orchila
    - Los Roques Archipelago
  - Los Hermanos Archipelago
  - Los Monjes Archipelago
  - Patos Island
  - La Sola Island
  - Los Testigos Islands
  - La Tortuga Island
- Miranda
- Nueva Esparta
  - Coche Island
  - Cubagua Island
  - Margarita Island
- Sucre
- Vargas
- Zulia
