= Index of Venezuela-related articles =

The location of the Bolivarian Republic of Venezuela

The following is an alphabetical list of topics related to Venezuela.

== 0–9 ==
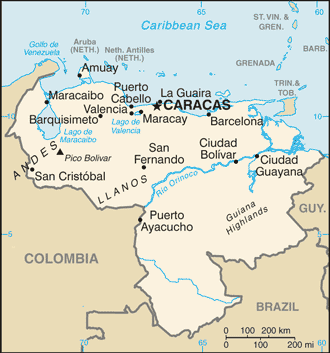
A map of Venezuela

- .ve – Internet country code top-level domain for Venezuela

== A ==
- Amazonas State, Venezuela
- Americas
  - South America
    - Islands of Venezuela
      - North Atlantic Ocean
        - Mar Caribe (Caribbean Sea)
          - Golfo de Venezuela (Gulf of Venezuela)
- Angostura
- Añu
- Apure
- Araguaney
- Angel Falls
- Amazon biome
- Amazon rainforest
- Atlas of Venezuela

== B ==
- Barinas
- Bolivarian Republic of Venezuela (República Bolivariana de Venezuela)

== C ==
- Capital of Venezuela: Santiago de León de Caracas (Caracas)
- Caracas (Santiago de León de Caracas) – Capital of Venezuela since 1777
- Caribbean
- Caribbean Community (CARICOM)
- Caribbean Sea
- Categories:
  - Category:Venezuela
    - Category:Buildings and structures in Venezuela
    - Category:Communications in Venezuela
    - Category:Culture of Venezuela
    - Category:Economy of Venezuela
    - Category:Education in Venezuela
    - Category:Environment of Venezuela
    - Category:Films set in Venezuela
    - Category:Geography of Venezuela
    - Category:Government of Venezuela
    - Category:Health in Venezuela
    - Category:History of Venezuela
    - Category:Images of Venezuela
    - Category:Law of Venezuela
    - Category:Military of Venezuela
    - Category:Politics of Venezuela
    - Category:Science and technology in Venezuela
    - Category:Society of Venezuela
    - Category:Sport in Venezuela
    - Category:Transport in Venezuela
    - Category:Venezuela stubs
    - Category:Venezuelan people
    - Category:Venezuela-related lists
  - commons:Category:Venezuela
- Coat of arms of Venezuela
- Congress of Angostura
- Constitution of Venezuela
- Corruption in Venezuela
- Crisis in Venezuela
- Culture of Venezuela
- Currency of Venezuela
- Cuisine of Venezuela

== D ==
- Defensoría del Pueblo (Venezuela)
- Demographics of Venezuela
- Diplomatic missions of Venezuela

== E ==
- Economy of Venezuela
- Essequibo River

== F ==
The Flag of Venezuela

- Flag of Venezuela
- Foreign relations of Venezuela

== G ==
- "Gloria al Bravo Pueblo"
- Golfo de Venezuela
- Guajira Peninsula
- Gulf of Venezuela
- Geography of Venezuela
- Government of Venezuela

== H ==
- Hugo Chávez
- Human rights in Venezuela

== I ==
- International Organization for Standardization (ISO)
  - ISO 3166-1 alpha-2 country code for Venezuela: VE
  - ISO 3166-1 alpha-3 country code for Venezuela: VEN
  - ISO 3166-2:VE region codes for Venezuela
- Islands of Venezuela:
  - Blanquilla Island
  - Isla Aves
  - Isla de Coche
  - Isla de Cubagua
  - Isla de Patos
  - Isla Margarita
  - Islas Los Frailes
  - La Orchila
  - La Sola Island
  - La Tortuga Island
  - Las Aves Archipelago
  - Los Hermanos Archipelago
  - Los Monjes Archipelago
  - Los Roques Archipelago
  - Los Testigos Islands

== L ==
- La Guaira Bank
- Lake Maracaibo
- Latin America
- Lists related to Venezuela:
  - Diplomatic missions of Venezuela
  - List of anthems of Venezuela
  - List of companies of Venezuela
  - List of diplomatic missions in Venezuela
  - List of earthquakes in Venezuela
  - List of football stadiums in Venezuela
  - List of governors of Aragua
  - List of governors of Bolívar
  - List of governors of Guárico
  - List of governors of Monagas
  - List of governors of Vargas
  - List of Guarenas / Guatire metro stations
  - List of islands of Venezuela
  - List of newspapers in Venezuela
  - List of players from Venezuela in Major League Baseball
  - List of political parties in Venezuela
  - List of presidents and governors of Zulia
  - List of presidents of Venezuela
  - List of state trees of Venezuela
  - List of Venezuela governors
  - List of Venezuelan artists
  - List of Venezuelan writers
  - List of Venezuela-related topics
  - Lists of Venezuelans
  - Ranked list of Venezuelan states
  - Television in Venezuela

== M ==
- Manuel Cabré
- Mar Caribe
- Media of Venezuela
- Miss Venezuela
- Monagas
- Music of Venezuela

== N ==
- National anthem of Venezuela

== O ==
- Orinoco
- Outline of Venezuela

== P ==
- Palafitos
- Carlos Andrés Pérez
- Public Ministry of Venezuela

== R ==
- República Bolivariana de Venezuela (Bolivarian Republic of Venezuela)
- Cristóbal Rojas

== S ==
- Santiago de León de Caracas (Caracas) – Capital of Venezuela since 1777
- Se llamaba SN
- Shabono
- Simón Bolívar
- Spanish colonization of the Americas
- Spanish language
- States of Venezuela
  - Ranked list of Venezuelan states

== T ==
- Tabebuia
- Television in Venezuela
- Torture in Venezuela
- Transportation in Venezuela
- Tinaquillo

== U ==
- United Nations founding member state 1945
- Arturo Uslar Pietri

== V ==
- Venezuela
- Venezuelan War of Independence
- Venezuela (song)

== W ==
- Water supply and sanitation in Venezuela
- Wikimedia Atlas of Venezuela
- Wikipedia:WikiProject Topic outline/Drafts/Outline of Venezuela

== Z ==
- Zulia

== See also ==
- List of international rankings
- Lists of country-related topics
- Outline of geography
- Outline of South America
- Outline of Venezuela
- United Nations
