= Insular Region, Venezuela =

Natural region in Venezuela

Insular Region Región Insular
- Geographic/Natural and Administrative Region
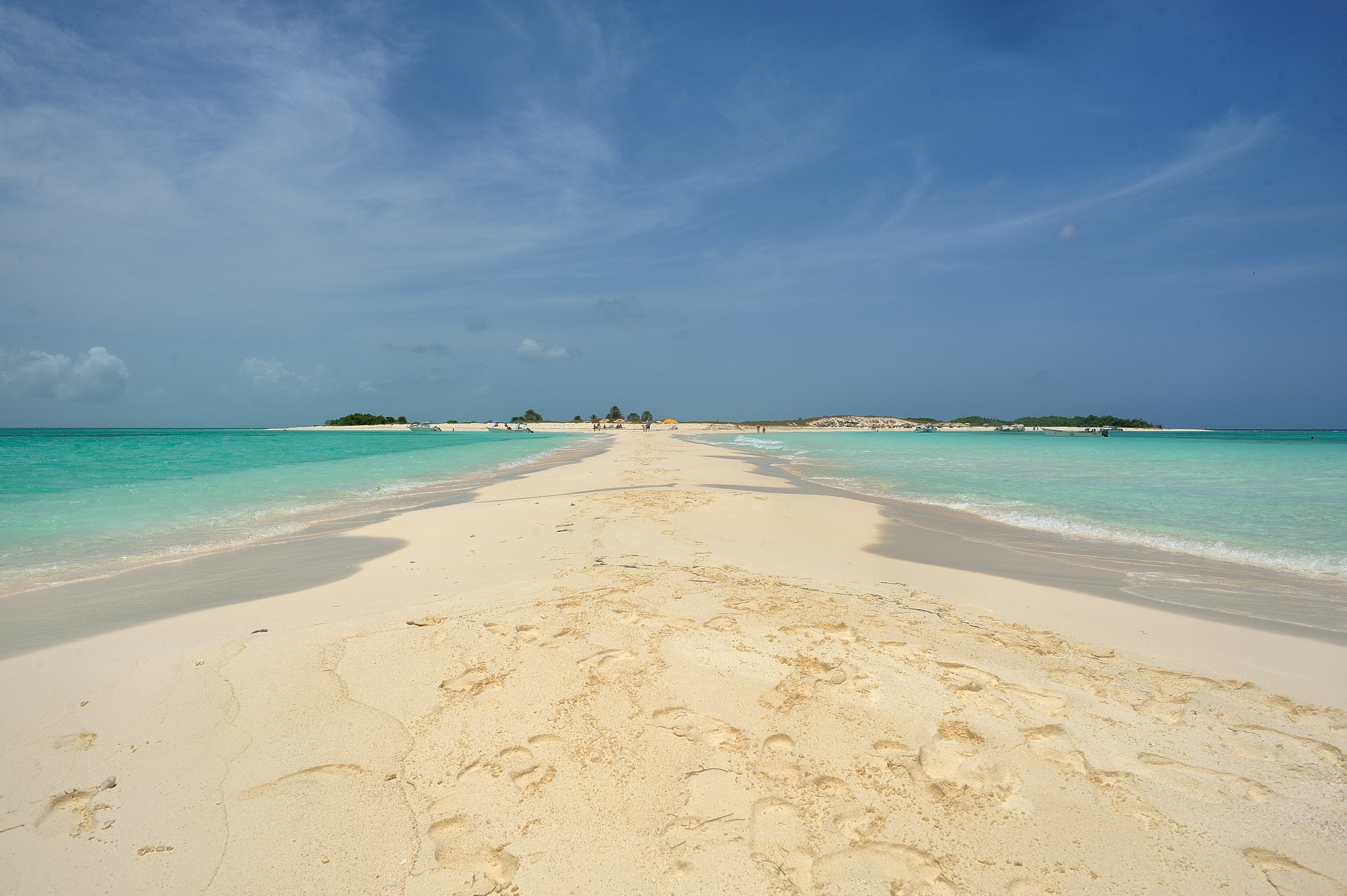
- Cayo de Agua Island, Los Roques archipelago

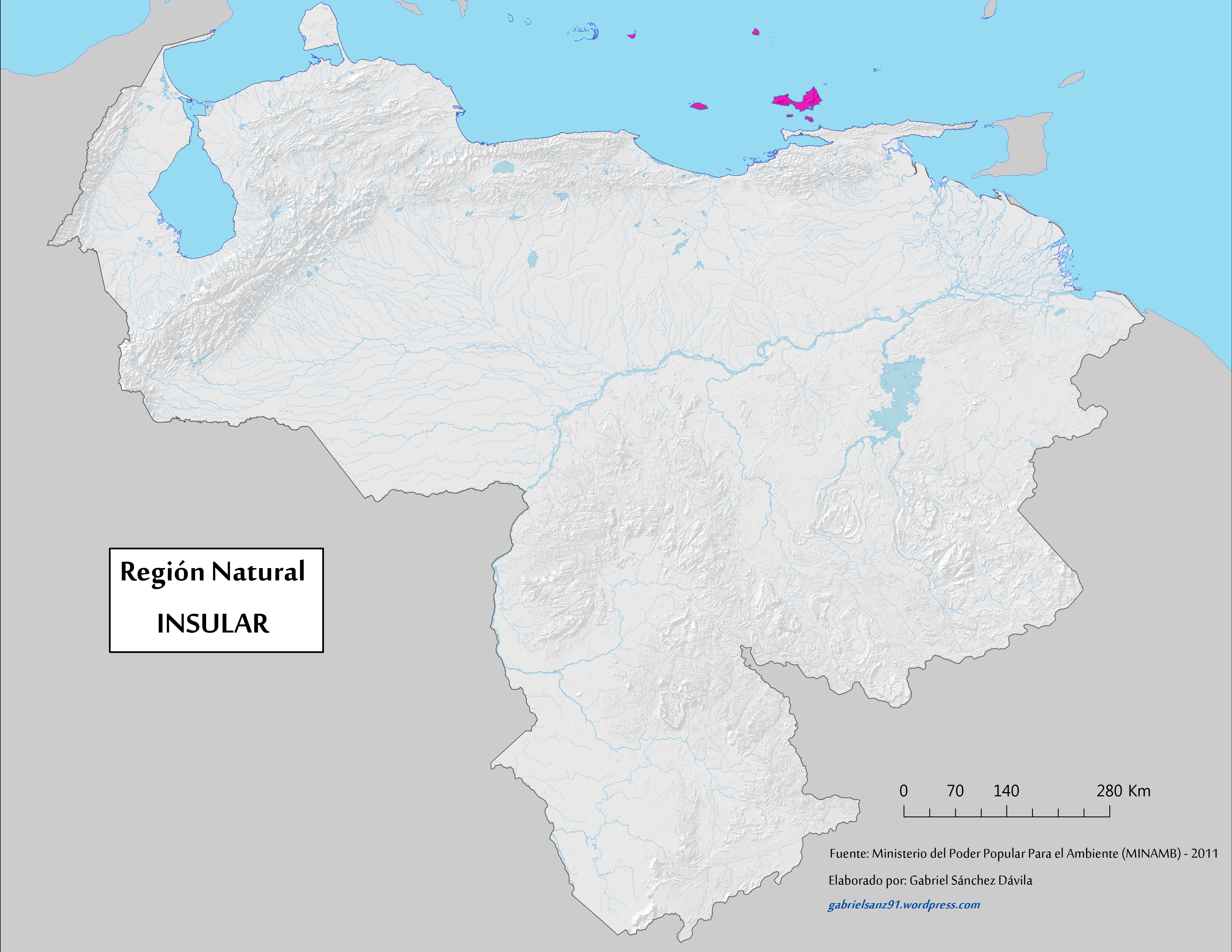
- Geographic map of Insular natural region
- Coordinates: 11°N 64°W
- Country: Venezuela
- State: Nueva Esparta and Federal Dependencies
- Region: Caribbean Sea

Population (2011)
  - Total: 493,765

The Insular Region (Spanish: Región Insular) is one of the eight natural regions and one of the nine administrative regions of Venezuela. It comprises all of the nation's offshore islands and is formed by the state of Nueva Esparta and the Federal Dependencies.

== History ==
On August 15, 1498, during the third voyage, Christopher Columbus arrived in Margarita Island. On that trip, the Admiral also arrived on the mainland, Venezuela. That August day, Columbus sighted three islands, two of them small, low and arid (the present Coche and Cubagua).

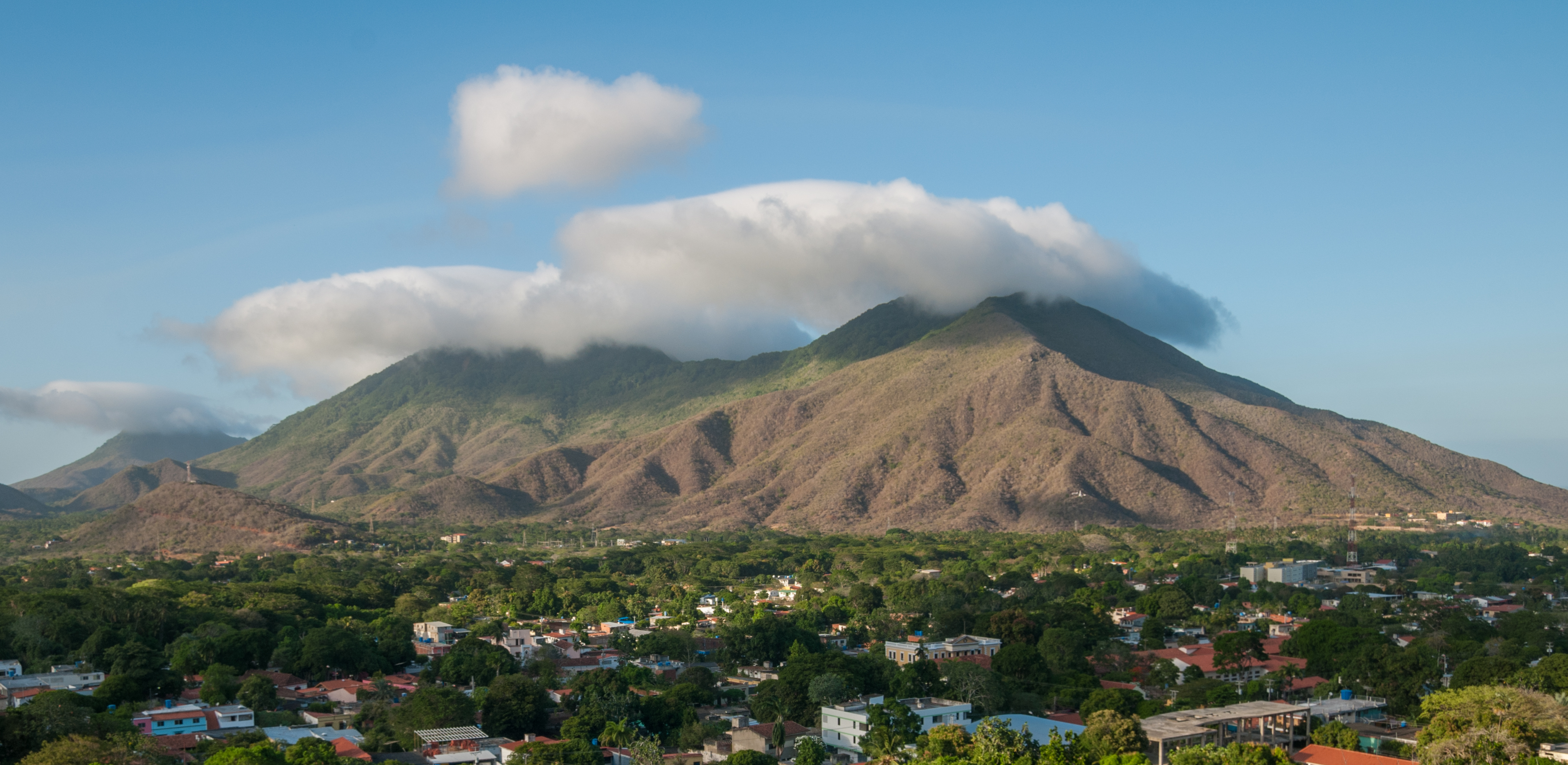
La Asunción, capital of the Nueva Esparta State, was founded by the Spanish in 1565

On April 19, 1810, Margarita was one of the seven Venezuelan provinces that declared their independence from the Spanish Crown, and in 1830, when the Republic of Colombia (Gran Colombia) was dissolved and the independent Republic of Venezuela emerged, it was also one of its 13 original provinces.

On November 8, 1777, the Royal Decree of Charles III of Spain recognized that the group of Spanish islands near the southeast of the Caribbean Sea would come under the jurisdiction of the Captaincy General of Venezuela. With the Venezuelan independence, all the islands remained under the dominion of Venezuela and in the same way until the formation of the Great Colombia.

On August 22, 1871, Venezuelan President Antonio Guzmán Blanco decided to group all the Venezuelan islands, except Coche, Cubagua, Margarita and Isla de Aves, as the Federal Territory of Columbus, which would be controlled by a governor appointed by the President of the Republic.

The United Kingdom wanted the Isla de Patos, but on February 26, 1942, it was resolved by the delimitation of the soil and subsoil of the Gulf of Paria. The Los Monjes Archipelago, which Venezuela integrated as part of its territory, was the object of controversy, but in 1952, the Colombian Foreign Minister recognized Venezuelan sovereignty over the territory through a diplomatic note and in 1992, the Colombian government affirmed that it would not claim the territory.

In October 2011, a new decree was approved as an organic law for the Federal Dependencies and island territories. With this, the Insular Territory Francisco de Miranda grouped Los Roques, La Orchila, Isla de Aves and Las Aves in the same entity.

== Geography ==
The region is the smallest in the country, its main characteristic is its condition of being composed of small islands. The climate is warm, and tropical. The largest islands of Venezuela are located in the State of Nueva Esparta and the Federal Dependencies.

=== Demographics ===
The population is mostly concentrated in the state of Nueva Esparta, with about 400,000 inhabitants, the Federal Dependencies have more than 2,150 inhabitants concentrated on the island of Gran Roque (Los Roques Archipelago) with 1,471 inhabitants according to data from the National Institute of Statistics of Venezuela

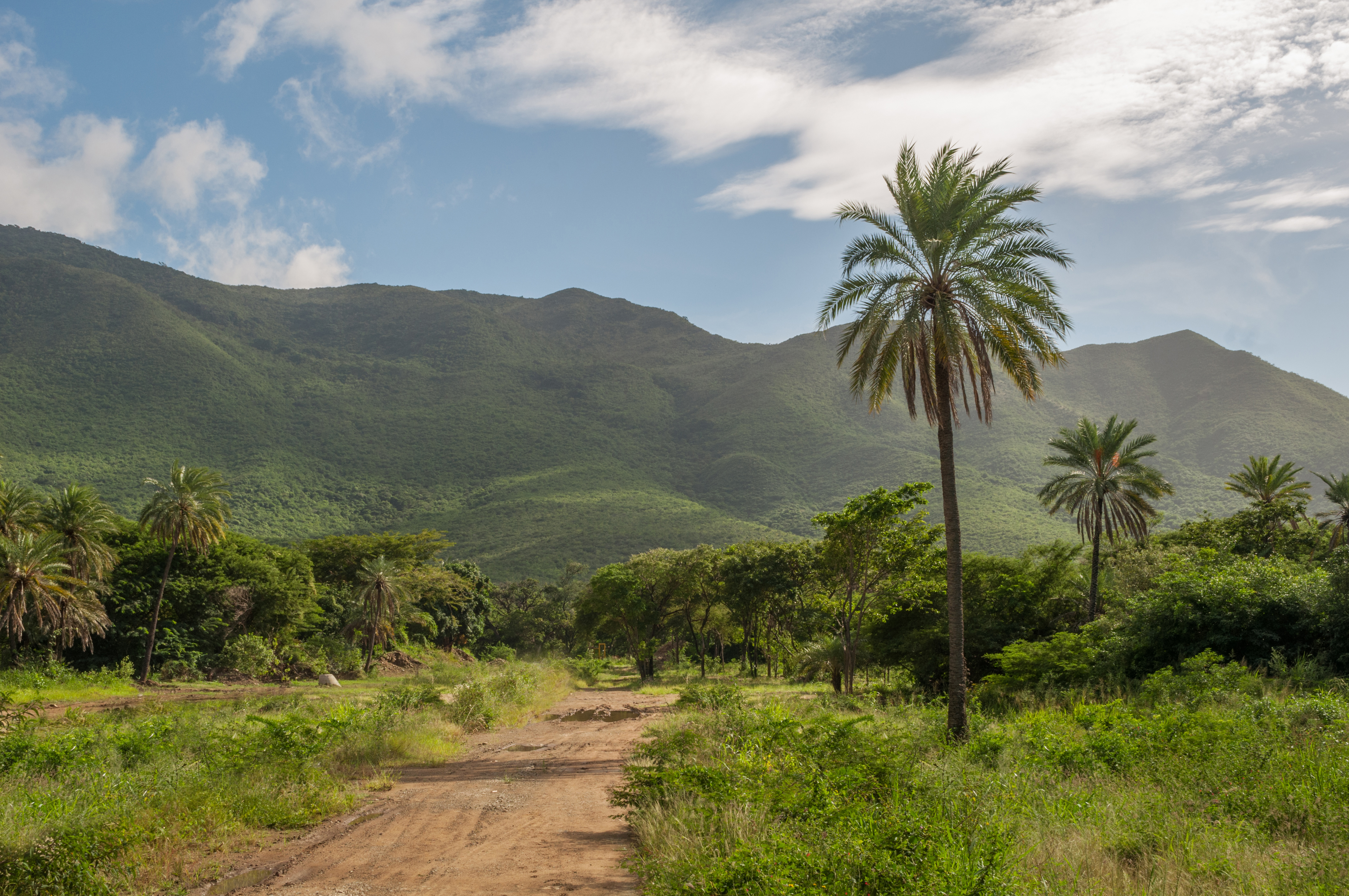
San Juan Valley, Margarita Island

=== Hydrography ===
As far as hydrography is concerned, the region has only small streams because most of its territory consists of small islands in the Caribbean Sea.

== Economy ==
The regional economy revolves almost entirely around tourism, because of its beautiful landscapes and beaches. Nueva Esparta and the federal dependencies are one of the favorite places for Venezuelans and foreigners to spend their vacations. There are also fishing activities around the islands.

The Archipelago of Los Roques is one of the biggest tourist attractions of the country with a variety of beaches and cays that are visited by tourists from all over the world.

== Gallery ==
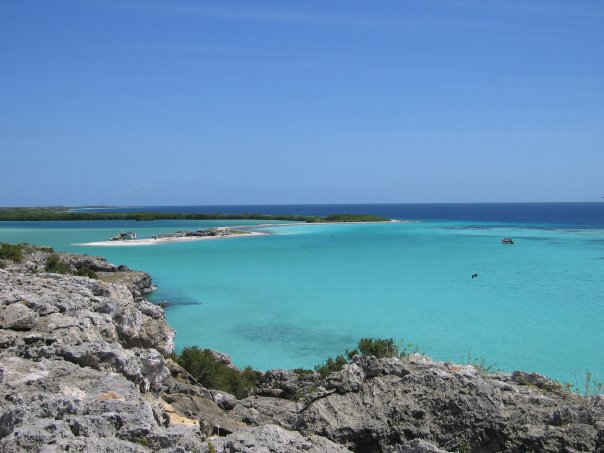
La Tortuga Island, Venezuela

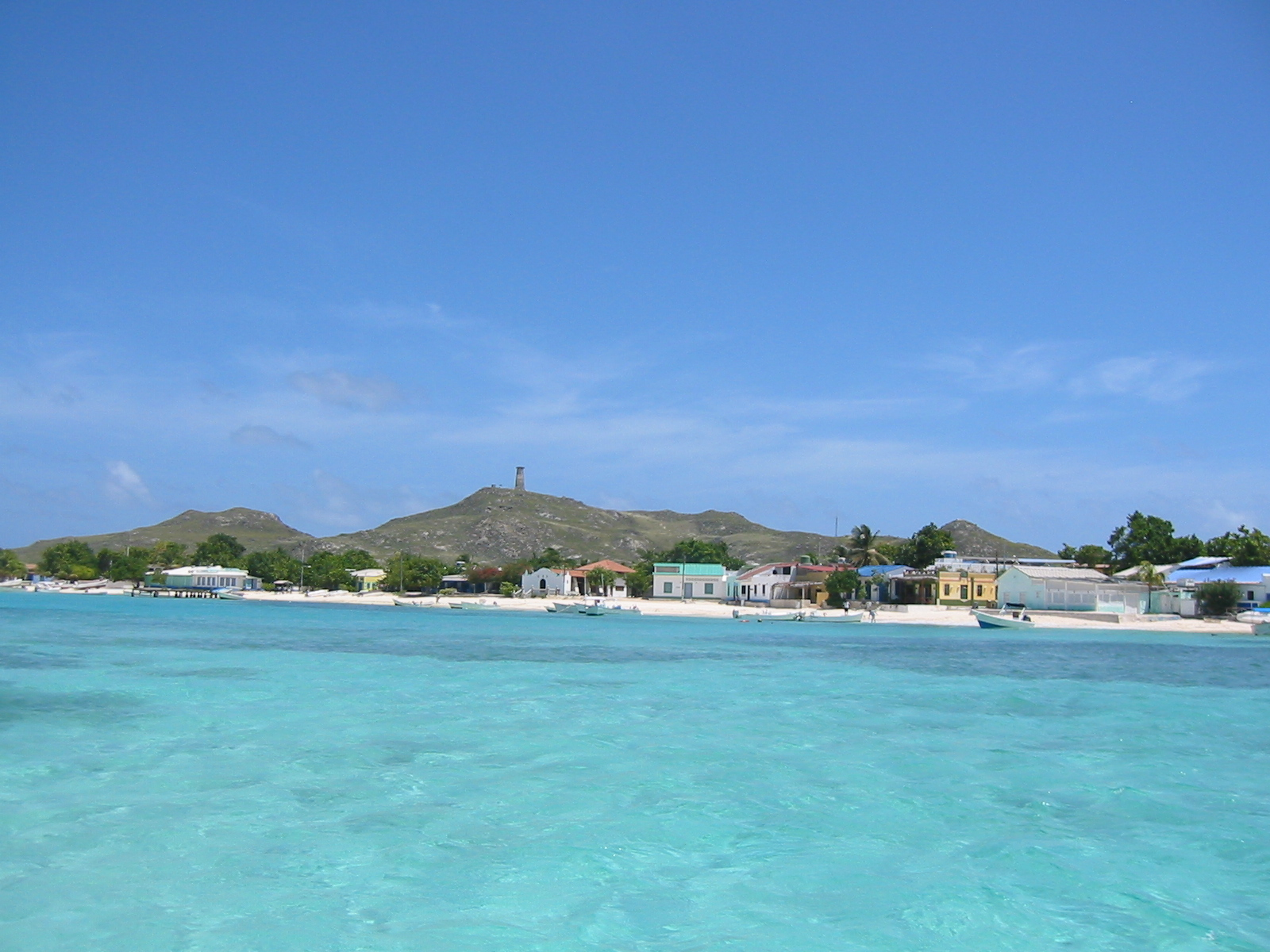
Gran Roque Island, Los Roques National Park

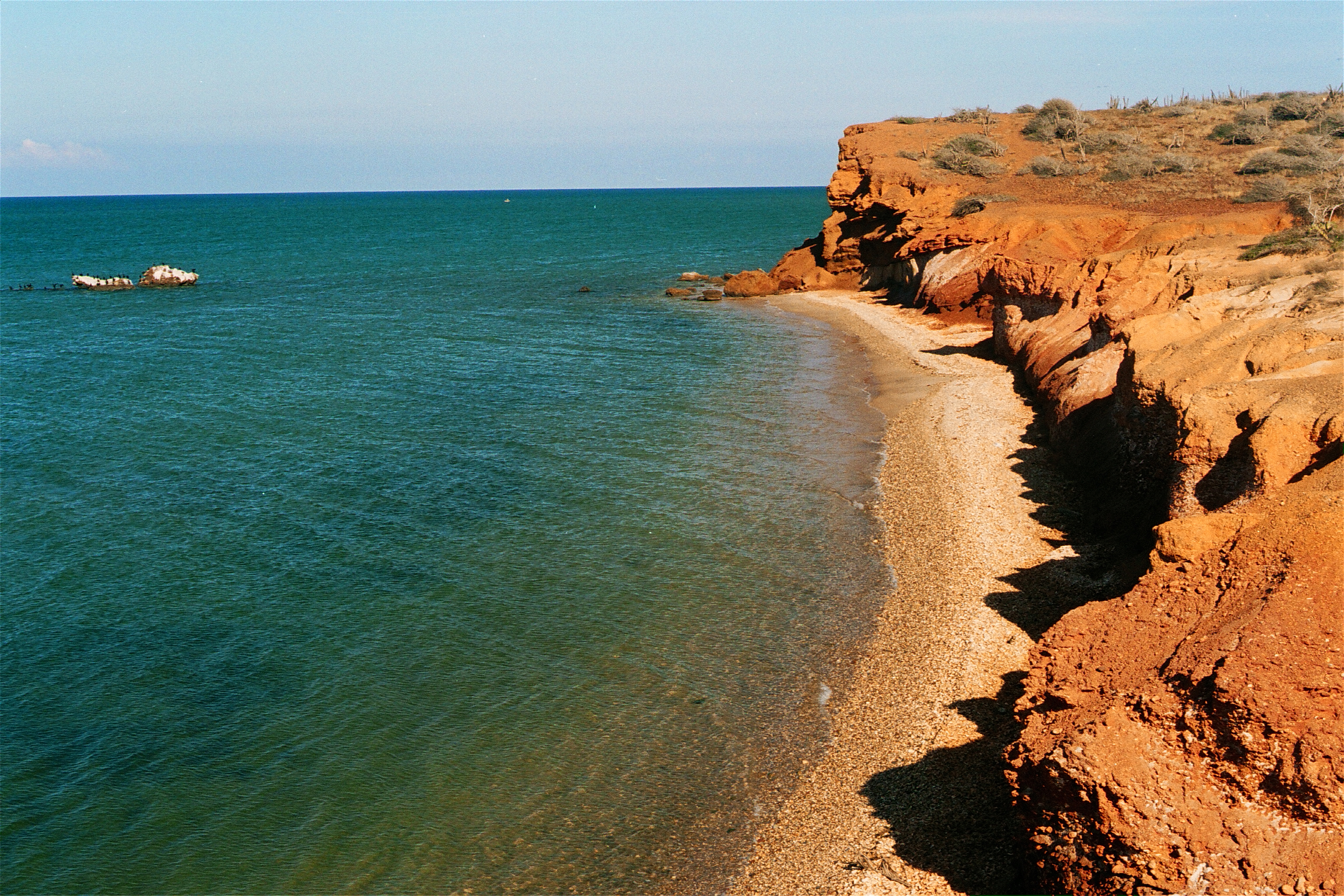
El Amor Beach, Coche Island

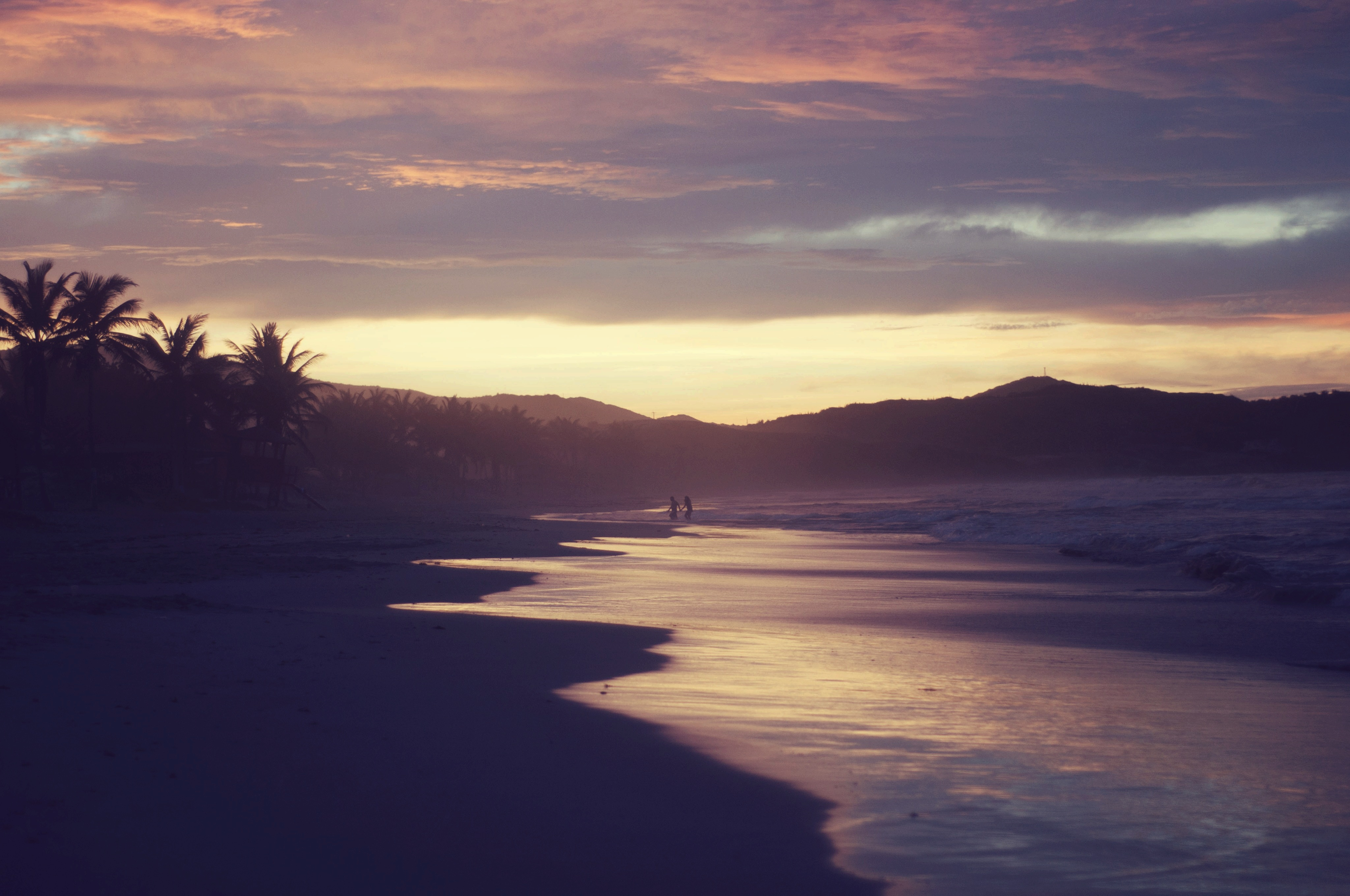
El Agua Beach, Margarita Island

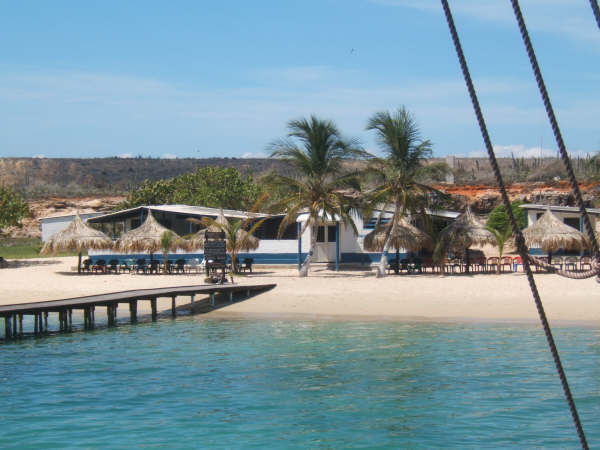
Cubagua Island, Nueva Esparta State
