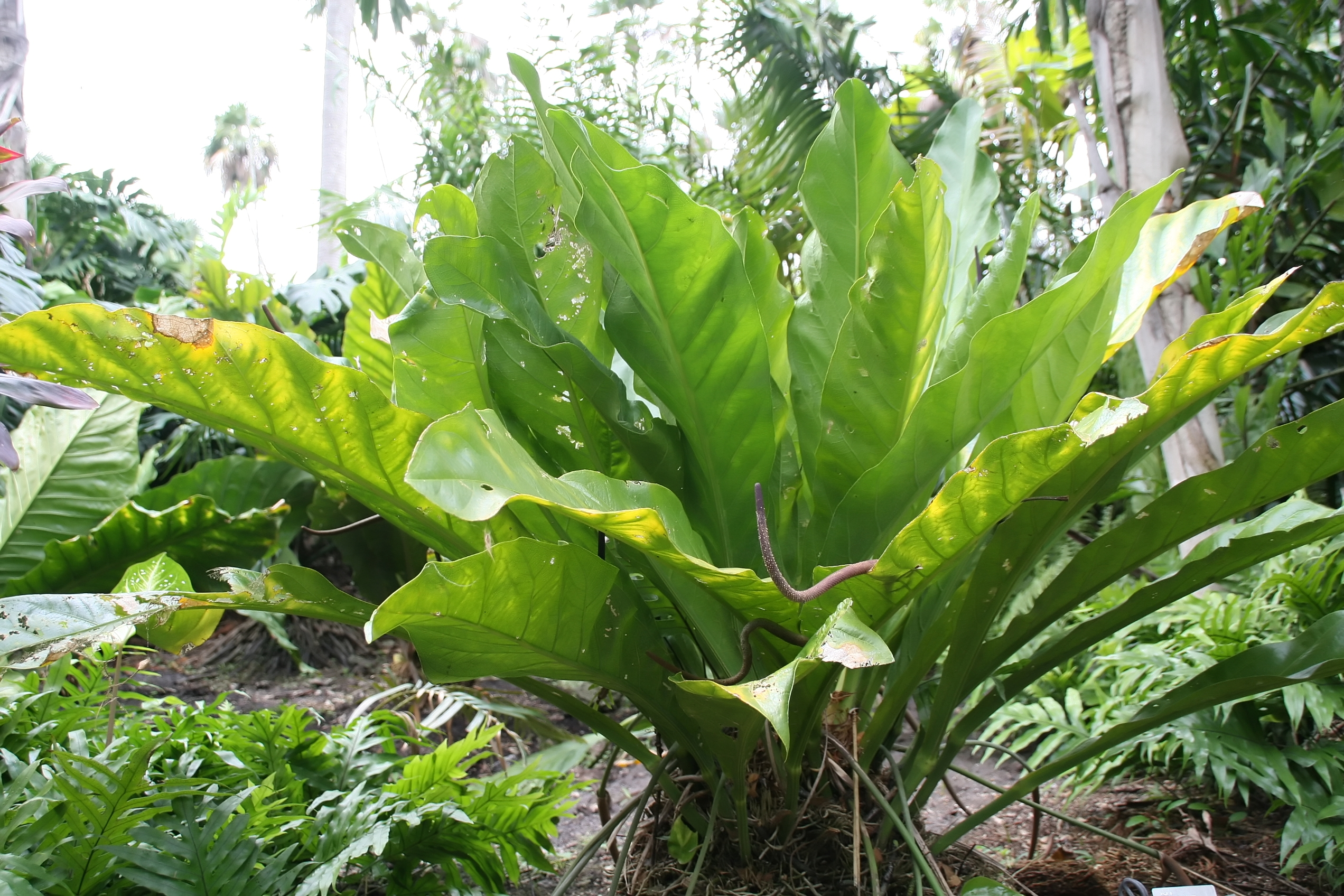
- Leaves can reach 1 m (3.3 ft)
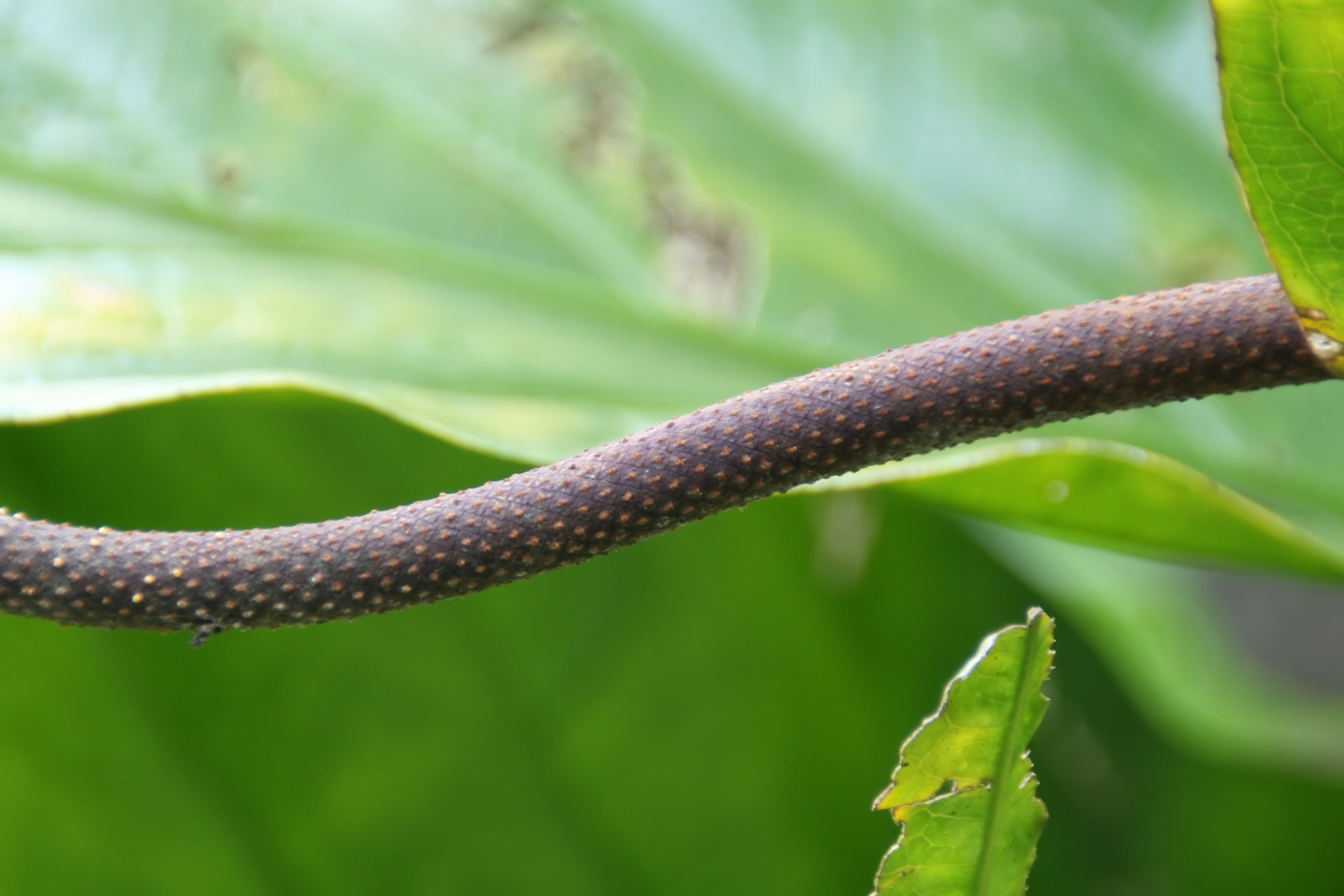
- Spadix

Scientific classification
- Kingdom: Plantae
- Clade: Embryophytes
- Clade: Tracheophytes
- Clade: Angiosperms
- Clade: Monocots
- Order: Alismatales
- Family: Araceae
- Genus: Anthurium
- Species: A. crenatum

Binomial name
- Anthurium crenatum (L.) Kunth

Synonyms
- Anthurium acaule var. brevipes Engl.; Anthurium acaule var. scolopendrium (Spreng.) Kuntze; Pothos crenatus L.; Pothos scolopendrius Spreng.

= Anthurium crenatum =

Species of flowering plant

Anthurium crenatum, the scalloped laceleaf, is a species of flowering plant in the family Araceae, native to the Dominican Republic, Puerto Rico, and the U.S. Virgin Islands, and introduced to the Venezuelan Antilles. With its large, textured leaves it is suitable for containers.
