= Cyperus bonariensis =

Scientific classification
- Kingdom: Plantae
- Clade: Tracheophytes
- Clade: Angiosperms
- Clade: Monocots
- Clade: Commelinids
- Order: Poales
- Family: Cyperaceae
- Genus: Cyperus
- Species: C. bonariensis

Binomial name
- Cyperus bonariensis G.C.Tucker

Species of plant endemic to South America

Cyperus bonariensis is a species of flowering plant in the family Cyperaceae, native to Venezuela and two groups of offshore Caribbean islands, the Netherlands Antilles and the Venezuelan Antilles. It was first described by Gordon C. Tucker in 2013.
