= Volvarina morrocoyensis =

Scientific classification
- Kingdom: Animalia
- Phylum: Mollusca
- Class: Gastropoda
- Subclass: Caenogastropoda
- Order: Neogastropoda
- Family: Marginellidae
- Genus: Volvarina
- Species: V. morrocoyensis

Binomial name
- Volvarina morrocoyensis Caballer, Espinosa & Ortea, 2013

Species of gastropod

Volvarina morrocoyensis is a species of sea snail, a marine gastropod mollusk in the family Marginellidae, the margin snails.

== Description ==
First described by Manuel Caballer, Jose Espinosa, Jesus Ortea, and Samuel Narciso in 2013, the species was observed to have brownish bands in the shell, paired parallel plications, white body with red spots, and mantle with black spots grouped in bands.

The length of the shell attains 4.72 mm, its diameter 2.24 mm.

== Distribution ==
This marine species occurs off Tortuga Island, Venezuela.
