= La Sola Island =

Small island in the southeastern Caribbean Sea

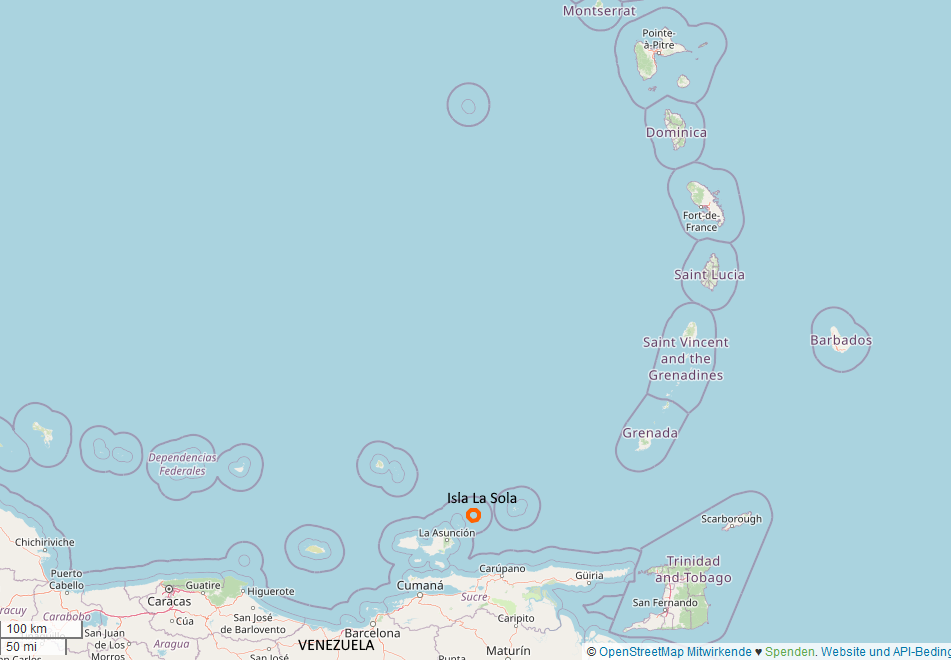
Location

La Sola Island (Spanish: Isla La Sola) is a small island in the southeastern Caribbean Sea. The island is a part of the Dependencias Federales (Federal Dependencies) of Venezuela.

== Geography ==
La Sola Island is located about 370 km (230 mi) northeast of Caracas, about 20 km (12 mi) northeast of Islas Los Frailes and about 55 km (34 mi) southeast of Islas Los Testigos. The coordinates are 11°18′21.2″N 63°34′20.2″W.

The uninhabited island has an area of barely 500 square meters, with the highest point reaching 8.5 meters (28 feet).

== History ==
In 1938, the island was put under the administration of the Ministerio del Interior y de Justicia (Ministry of Interior and Justice) (2) as part of the Dependencias Federales.

On August 9, 1972, the island, together with the other islands of the Dependencias Federales, were declared a national park (3) with the park being established on August 18.

== See also ==
- Federal Dependencies of Venezuela
- List of marine molluscs of Venezuela
- List of sponges of Venezuela
