= Los Hermanos Archipelago =

Chain of seven rocky barren islets part of the Federal Dependencies of Venezuela

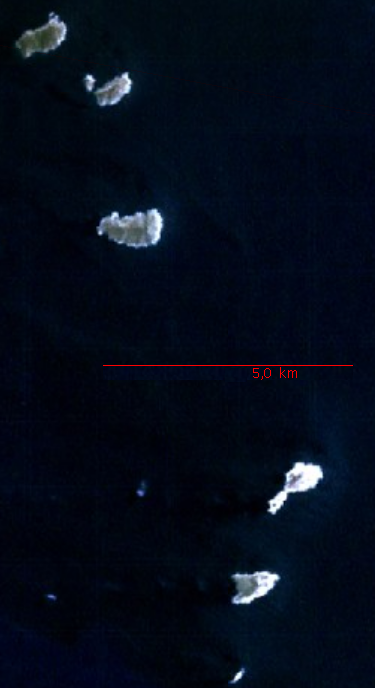
Satellite view

The Los Hermanos Archipelago is a chain of seven rocky barren islets that is part of the Federal Dependencies of Venezuela, at 11°45′N 64°25′W.

== Islands ==
The individual islands are:

- Isla La Orquilla
- Islote El Rajao
- Isla Los Morochos
- Islote Papelón
- Isla Grueso
- Isla Pico (Isla Pando)
- Isla Fondeadero
- Isla Chiquito

== See also ==
- Federal Dependencies of Venezuela
- List of marine molluscs of Venezuela
- List of Poriferans of Venezuela
