= La Blanquilla Island =

Caribbean island belonging to Venezuela

La Blanquilla
Native name: Dependencia Federal Isla La Blanquilla
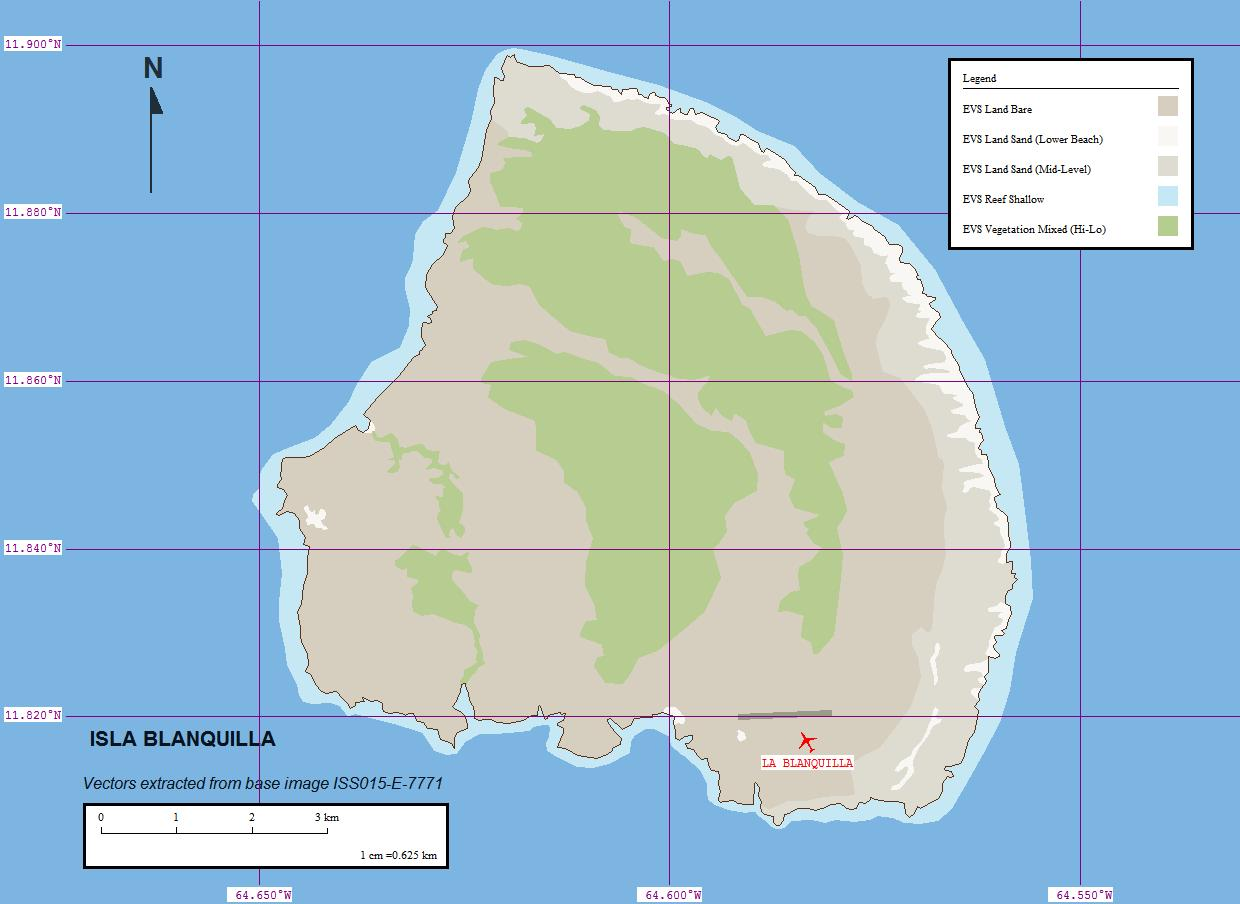
- Blanquilla Island
- Interactive map of La Blanquilla

Geography
- Location: Caribbean Sea
- Coordinates: 11°51′12″N 64°35′55″W
- Area: 64.53 km^{2} (24.92 sq mi)

Administration
- Venezuela
- Federal Dependencies of Venezuela

Demographics
- Population: 0
- Pop. density: 0/km^{2} (0/sq mi)

Blanquilla is an island, one of the Federal Dependencies of Venezuela, located in the south-eastern Caribbean Sea about 293 km (182 miles) north-east of Caracas. It is a popular location for divers, as well as famous for its white sand beaches, for which it is named.

== Geography ==
The island is formed by the Aves Ridge, a seafloor feature which protrudes above water to the north, forming several other islands. Its reefs are notable for their black coral, which is used for jewelry and other crafts. The island has an area of around 64.53 km^{2}

=== Environment ===
The island's wildlife includes local cacti and green iguanas, as well as feral donkeys and goats. It, along with its surrounding waters, has been designated an Important Bird Area (IBA) by BirdLife International because it supports significant populations of brown pelicans, brown and masked boobies, and yellow-shouldered amazons.

== See also ==
- Federal Dependencies of Venezuela
- List of marine molluscs of Venezuela
- List of Poriferans of Venezuela
