= Federal Dependencies of Venezuela =

Administrative division of Venezuela

Federal Dependencies of Venezuela Dependencias Federales de Venezuela
- Federal territory of Venezuela
- Flag

- Location in Venezuela
- Country: Venezuela
- Created: 1938
- Capital: Gran Roque
- Islands and Groups: List: Aves Island (Isla de Aves); Las Aves Archipelago (Archipiélago Las Aves); La Blanquilla Island (Isla La Blanquilla); Los Frailes Archipelago (Archipiélago Los Frailes); La Sola Island (Isla La Sola); Patos Island (Isla de Patos); Los Hermanos Archipelago (Islas Los Hermanos); Los Monjes Archipelago (Archipiélago Los Monjes, disputed area); La Orchila Island (Isla La Orchila); Los Roques Archipelago (Archipiélago Los Roques); Los Testigos Islands (Islas Los Testigos); La Tortuga Island (Isla La Tortuga)

Government
  - General President: Delcy Rodríguez (acting)

Area
  - Total: 342 km^{2} (132 sq mi)

Population (2011 Census)
  - Total: 2,155
- Time zone: UTC−04:00

The Federal Dependencies of Venezuela (Spanish: Dependencias Federales de Venezuela) encompass most of Venezuela's offshore islands in the Caribbean Sea, excluding those islands that form the state of Nueva Esparta and some Caribbean coastal islands that are integrated with nearby states. These islands, with a total area of 342 square kilometres, are sparsely populated – according to the preliminary results of the 2011 Census only 2,155 people live there permanently, with another hundred from Margarita Island who live there seasonally to engage in fishing. Local government is officially under the authority of the central government in Caracas, although de facto power is often held by the heads of the sparse and somewhat isolated communities that decorate the territories. of the population of the Federal Dependencies can be found in the Archipelago of Los Roques dating back to approximately 1200 BC, when it is believed that Indigenous Caribs came from Curaçao, Aruba or the mainland visited the islands, especially Two Mosquises Sur, Crasquí and Cayo Sal, to supply themselves with food and salt.

Sample of the presence of these first settlers are the concheros of botutos that abound in the beaches of Los Roques. These sporadic waves of Indigenous ethnic groups became more frequent towards the year 1000 AD, when in Dos Mosquises North fishermen and farmers from Ocumare de la Costa and the Central Coast, who formed the only ocumaroid settlement in the Venezuelan Antilles, where they exploited their natural resources and cultivated much of its artistic manifestations.

A new migratory wave took place in 1300 approximately, when the carriers of the Valencioid ceramics arrived to the archipelago and settled in Dos Mosquises Sur.

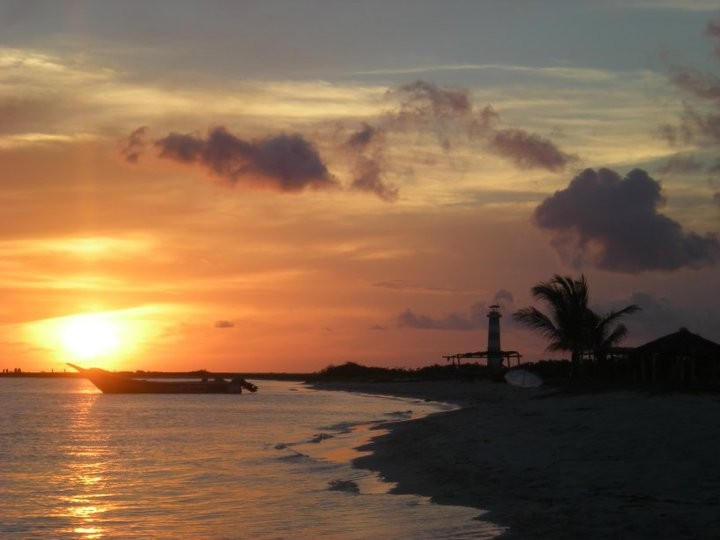
The Dutch settled in La Tortuga in 1605 until they were again evicted by the Spanish in 1631.

== Spanish colonization ==
Between the 16th and 18th centuries salt was one of the most coveted resources and their exploitation in the Venezuelan natural salt mines was controlled by the authorities of the Colony. At the end of the 18th century in the salt mines of Cayo Sal, located in the southwestern part of the Los Roques archipelago, the Spanish authorities installed a small customs office of which it is believed that there are still remains (foundations of its infrastructure made of coral formations).

Old references indicate that the Dutch expelled from Araya by the Spaniards in 1605 settled in La Tortuga to exploit its salt mines until they were again evicted in 1631. In 1840 Agustín Codazzi made a description of the island mentioning also the extraction of salt. It was not until the end of the 19th century and beginning of the 20th century that La Tortuga aroused the interest of scientists, who have studied its fauna and flora.

One of the most interesting facts in history of the federal dependencies was given between the 8 and the December 12, 1842, when three corvetas that transported to the country the rest of Simón Bolívar managed to flee of a storm when taking refuge in Los Roques.

On November 8, 1777, it was recognised by the Royal Decree of Charles III of Spain that the group of Spanish islands near the southeast of the Caribbean Sea would come under the jurisdiction of the Captaincy General of Venezuela. With the Venezuelan independence, all the islands remained under Venezuelan rule and in the same way until the formation of Gran Colombia. In 1830, Venezuela seceded from Gran Colombia and regained sovereignty over its islands in the Caribbean. On March 30, 1845, Venezuela and Spain signed a Treaty of Peace and Friendship in which Isabela II of Spain officially recognised Venezuela's independence and all the territories and islands that belonged to the Captaincy General of Venezuela at the time of independence.

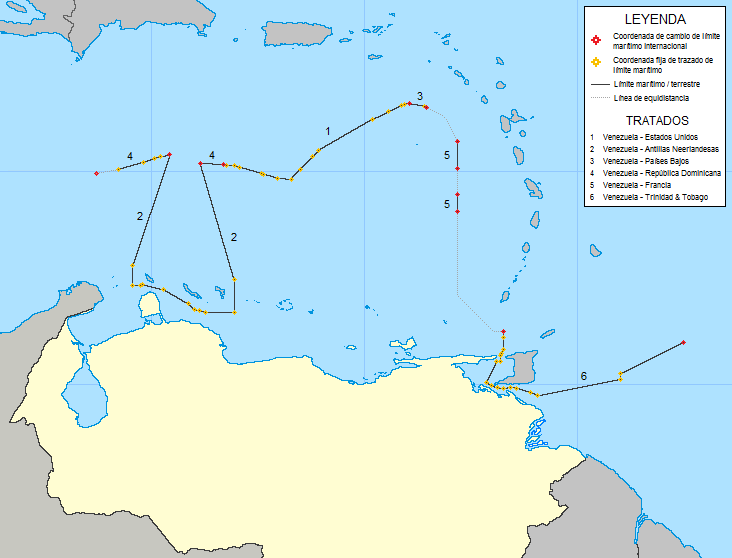
Map showing the maritime border treaties between Venezuela and the US, France, the Netherlands, Dominican Republic and Trinidad and Tobago, setting part of the borders of the Federal Dependencies.

In 1777, when the Captaincy General of Venezuela was created, the island of Patos became part of the province of Cumaná. In 1803, through a treaty known as the Peace of Amiens, Spain ceded the island of Trinidad to England, since it had been occupied by British citizens since 1797.

== Independent Venezuela ==
Although the island of Patos was not mentioned in the treaty. When the British took over the island, they considered it part of Trinidad and annexed it to their possessions. In 1942 England recognized Venezuelan sovereignty over the island on the occasion of the delimitation of the underwater areas of the Gulf of Paria and the Venezuelan flag was raised on its shores on September 28, 1942.

On April 28, 1856, a new Law of Political Territorial Division was decreed, where the creation of the Province of Margarita was resolved. One of its cantons, called Cantón Norte, was composed of 10 parishes, of which 4 are part of what today are some of the current Federal Dependencies, these are San Juan and the islands of Tortuga, Blanquilla, Testigos and Aves de Barlovento with all those that are adjacent to them.

The US began exploiting guano on Aves Island in the mid-nineteenth century. Venezuela claimed sovereignty over the islands, and after a long legal dispute, the United States recognized Venezuelan sovereignty over the island in 1861. The Netherlands made claims over these same islands but the conflict was resolved through arbitration in 1865 by recognizing again Venezuelan sovereignty over Isla de Aves.

On August 22, 1871, Venezuelan President Antonio Guzman Blanco decided to group all the Venezuelan islands except Coche, Cubagua, Margarita and Isla de Aves as Federal Territory Colón,4 which would be controlled by a governor appointed by the President of the Republic. Then, under the presidency of Joaquin Crespo, on July 4, 1895, the Aves Island was included within the Federal Territory by national decree. On May 16, 1905, Cipriano Castro decided to include Coche Island within the Federal Territory, establishing its capital in San Pedro de Coche; however, this decision was short-lived due to the protests the government received from Margarita Island. After three years, on August 31, 1908, the island was returned to Nueva Esparta and the Federal Territory of Colon was dissolved, establishing direct control of the islands by the National Executive.

On July 4, 1938, the Ley Orgánica de las Dependencias Federales was passed under the government of Eleazar López Contreras, which completely regulated the situation of the islands. The United Kingdom wanted Isla de Patos, but on February 26, 1942, it was resolved by delimiting the soil and subsoil of the Gulf of Paria. The Archipelago of Los Monjes, which Venezuela integrated as part of its territory, was the subject of controversy but in 1952 the Colombian Foreign Minister recognised Venezuelan sovereignty over the territory through a diplomatic note and in 1992 the Colombian government stated that it would not claim the territory. On August 23, 1972, the Bird Island was declared a national Wildlife Refuge. On June 2, 1978, the "Simón Bolívar" Naval Scientific Base was created on Aves Island. That same year, an attempt was made in the Chamber of Deputies of the then National Congress to approve a bill for the creation of the Caribbean Archipelago Territory, but this proposal could not be carried out because it was against some provisions of the 1961 Venezuelan Constitution.

On March 28 and 31, 1978 the final maritime limits with the United States were signed (1978 Treaty between the United States and Venezuela or United States–Venezuela Maritime Boundary Treaty) which set the limits with Puerto Rico and the US Virgin Islands. and the Netherlands (1978 Treaty between the Netherlands and Venezuela or Netherlands–Venezuela Boundary Treaty) which set the limits with the Netherlands Antilles, then on July 17, 1983, it did the same with France.

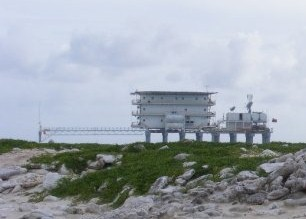
The Simón Bolívar Scientific-Military Base on the Aves Island established in 1978

These three treaties establish Venezuela's current continental shelf and exclusive economic zone in the Caribbean Sea. On April 4, 1986, the National Directorate for the Coordination of Border Development and Federal Departments was set up under the Ministry of the Interior and Justice to administer the territory.

== 21st century ==
In October 2011, a new decree was approved as an organic law for the Federal Dependencies and island territories. A subdivision called Territorio Insular Francisco de Miranda was then created, which includes Los Roques, Las Aves and La Orchila.

In 2015, a diplomatic problem occurred between Venezuela and Colombia due to the incursion of Colombian and US frigates.

In recent years the Los Roques Airport has been expanded and remodeled and various structures have been built and renovated. On La Tortuga Island an ecological hotel was built and several buildings were erected to attract tourism.

== Geography ==
The federal dependencies are composed of 600 islands and smaller formations; many have an area of less than 10,000 square metres and are essentially simple rocks. The largest island, La Tortuga, accounts for almost half of the territory of the federal dependencies.

Dependencias Federales stretch for 900 km (560 mi) along the coast from Archipiélago Los Monjes in the west at the Gulf of Venezuela to Isla de Patos southeast of Isla Margarita at the Gulf of Paria in the east.

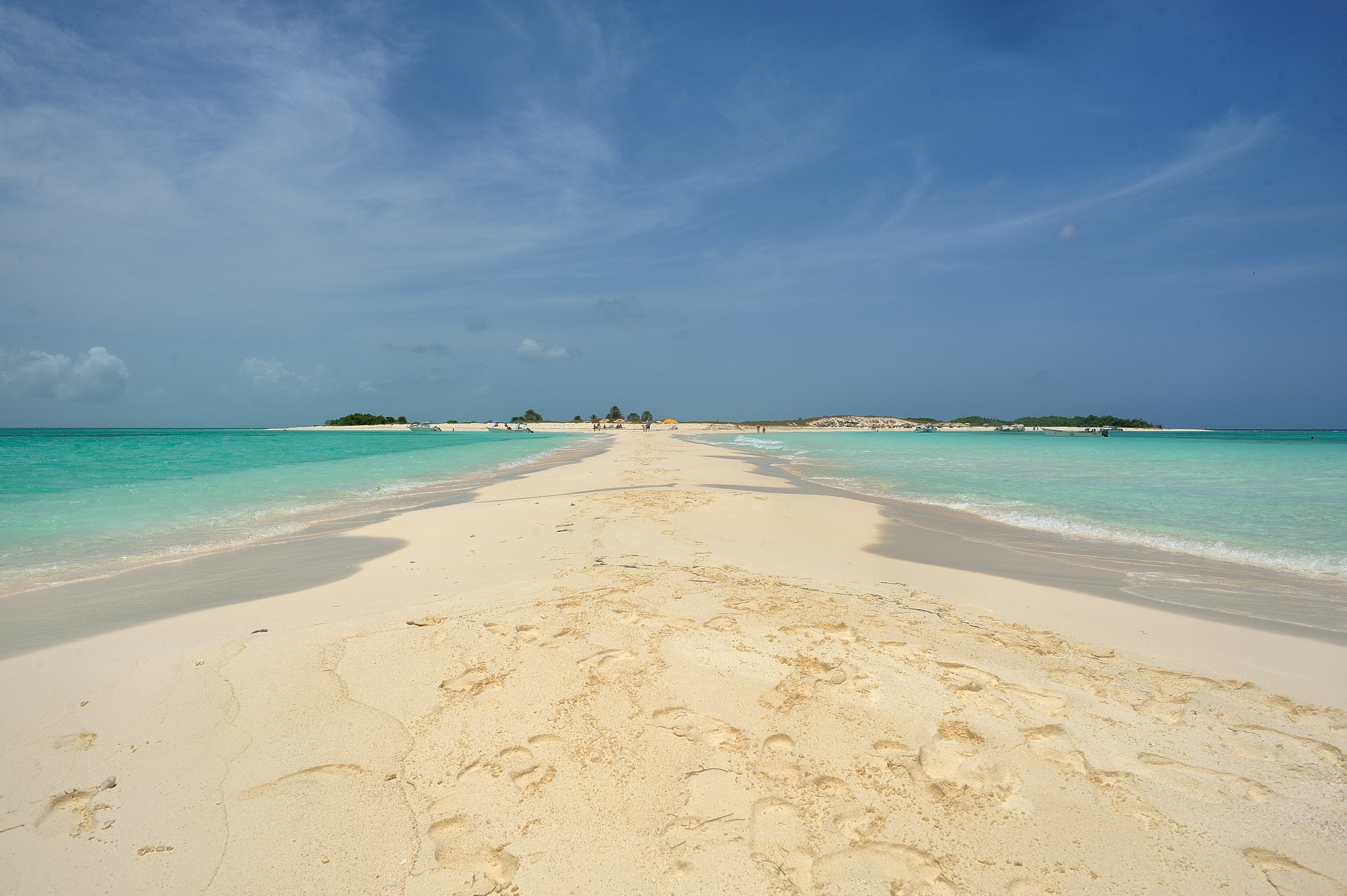
Cayo de Agua, Los Roques Archipelago

=== Biogeographical area ===
The World Geographical Scheme for Recording Plant Distributions groups the islands, excluding the abyssal Aves Island, into an area it calls the "Venezuelan Antilles" (Level 3 code "VNA").

=== Principal islands and archipelagos ===
These are set out below:

- Los Monjes Archipelago (Archipiélago Los Monjes)
- La Tortuga Island (Isla La Tortuga)
- La Sola Island (Isla La Sola)
- Los Testigos Islands (Islas Los Testigos)
- Los Frailes Archipelago (Archipiélago Los Frailes)
- Patos Island (Isla de Patos)
- Los Roques Archipelago (Archipiélago Los Roques)
- La Blanquilla Island (Isla La Blanquilla)
- Los Hermanos Archipelago (Archipiélago Los Hermanos)
- La Orchila Island (Isla La Orchila)
- Las Aves Archipelago (Archipiélago Las Aves)
- Aves Island (Isla de Aves)

Political Map Federal Administrative Agencies numbering based on the table of islands. 12 (Isla de Aves) is too far north to be shown.
Nr.	Island or archipelago	Surface km^{2}	Population; 2011 Census (preliminary return)	Members Islands	Coordinates
Within the Continental Shelf
1	Los Monjes Archipelago	0.20	-	Monjes del Norte – Monje del Este – Monjes del Sur	12°21′N 70°55′W
2	La Tortuga Island	156.60	-	Isla La Tortuga – Islas Los Tortuguillos – Cayo Herradura – Los Palanquines – Cayos de Ño Martín – Islote El Vapor – Cayos de Punta de Ranchos	10°55′N 65°18′W
3	La Sola Island	0.0005	-	Isla La Sola	11°18′N 63°34′W
4	Los Testigos Islands	6,53	172	Isla Conejo – Isla Iguana – Isla Morro Blanco – Isla Rajada – Isla Noroeste – Peñón de Fuera – Isla Testigo Grande	11°22′N 63°06′W
5	Los Frailes Archipelago	1.92	-	Chepere – Guacaraida – Puerto Real – Nabobo – Cominoto – Macarare – Guairiare – Guacaraida – La Balandra – La Peche	11°12′N 63°44′W
Outside of the Continental Shelf
6	Patos Island (Este)	0.60	-	Isla de Patos Este	10°38′N 61°52′W
7 (Note A)	Los Roques Archipelago	40.61	1,471	Gran Roque – Cayo Francisquí – Isla Larga – Nordisquí – Madrisquí – Crasquí – Dos Mosquises – Cayo Sal – Cayo Nube Verde – Cayo Grande – Noronquí – Espenquí – Cayo Carenero – Cayo Selesquí – Cayo Bequevé – Cayo de Agua – Cayo Grande	11°51′N 66°45′W
8	La Blanquilla Island	64.53	-	Isla La Blanquilla	11°50′N 64°35′W
9	Los Hermanos Archipelago	2.14	-	La Orquilla – Isla Los Morochos – Isla Grueso – Isla Pico (ó Isla Pando) – Isla Fondeadero – Isla Chiquito	11°45′N 64°25′W
10 (Note A)	La Orchila	40.00	-	Isla La Orchila – Cayo Agua – Cayo Sal – Cayo Noreste	11°47′N 66°10′W
11 (Note A)	Las Aves Archipelago	3.35	-	Isla Aves de Barlovento – Isla Tesoro – Cayo Bubi – Cayo de Las Bobas – Isla Aves de Sotavento – Isla Larga – Cayo Tirra – Isla Saquisaqui – Cayos de La Colonia – Isla Maceta – Cayo Sterna	12°00′N 67°40′W
Abyssal
12	Aves Island (Norte)	0.045	-	Isla de Aves	15°40′N 67°37′W
	Federal Dependencies of Venezuela	342.25	2,155		

- Note A: within the Dependencias Federales, the Archipiélago Los Roques, the Archipiélago Las Aves and the Isla La Orchila together comprise the Territorio Insular Francisco de Miranda, which was established on November 10, 2011.

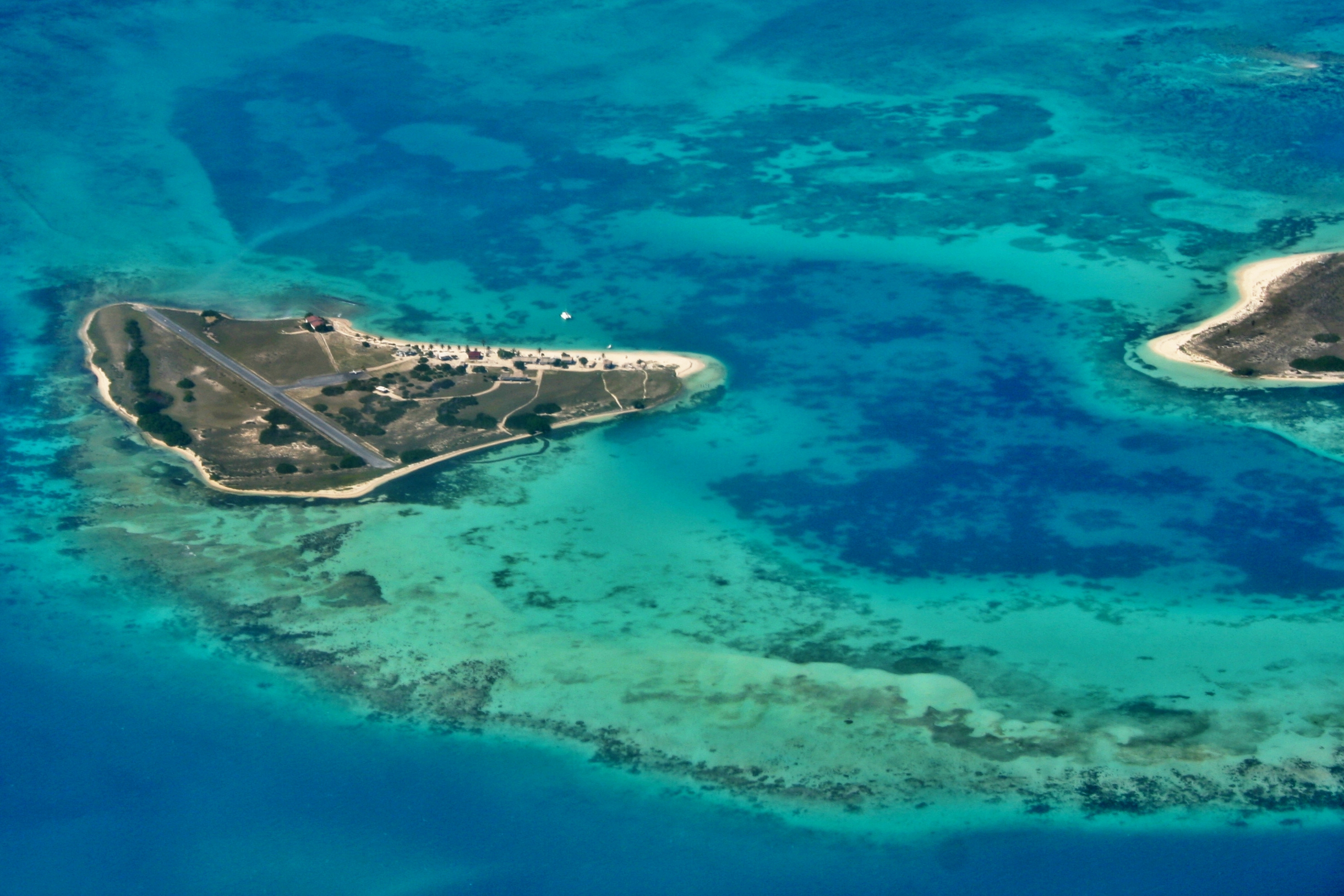
Reefs in the Dos Mosquises Islands

=== Reefs ===
Coral reefs form one of the most valuable ecosystems on the planet, thanks to their biodiversity, their high productivity and their appreciated fishing resources. Six of the twelve islands of the Federal Dependencies have recent reef formations. Venezuela has some of the most important reef formations in the Caribbean, such as the complex reefs of Las Aves Archipelago and Los Roques.

These complexes describe spectacular barrier reefs, fringing or coastal reefs, keys or coral islands and reef patches. The rest of the islands present recent coral formations of lesser extension and complexity, as is the case with Aves Island, which is mostly a fringing reef. La Blanquilla Island has only fringing reefs along the west and south coast. According to Méndez, the southern reef is more developed and not has as much coral variety as in Los Roques and Las Aves archipelago.

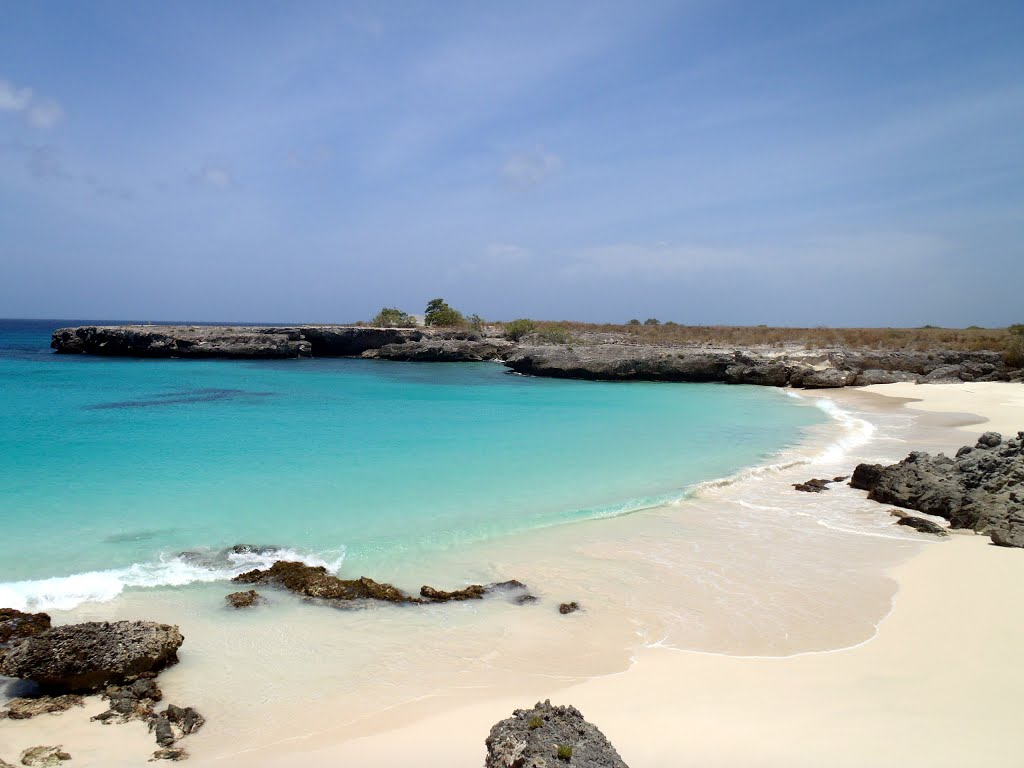
La Blanquilla is one of the largest islands in the Federal Dependencies

In primary formation is the northeastern barrier reef of the archipelago La Orchila and in the island LaTortuga the southern fringe reef is discontinuous. The archipelago Los Roques, Aves of Barlovento, Aves de Sotavento and La Blanquilla present similar characteristics in terms of the underwater morphology of the southern reef fronts. The reefs that extend along the southern perimeters of these complex reefs have a steep slope that extends to 40 m where there are two intermediate terraces at 14 and 22 m".

This rugged barrier reef exhibits a biological diversity of coral communities, of different forms of expression, associated with a fauna characteristic. In terms of threats, coral reefs are exposed to natural disturbances, such as coral bleaching, mainly due to warming waters. Other natural phenomena that impact the coral reefs are storms and hurricanes, as is the case with Aves Island. As well as natural disturbances, anthropogenic impacts also affect reefs, as is the case with pollution produced by sewage, hydrocarbons and tourist activity. Among the tourist activities, snorkeling, the diving, sport fishing, collecting fish, corals and snails, cause some damage. Also the grounding of ships and boats generates a great environmental impact on the reefs, which leads to their destruction.

=== Mangroves ===
The mangrove ecosystem is one of the most characteristic of the tropical zone and is very well represented in some of the islands of the Federal Dependencies. They constitute coastal forests of incredible biodiversity and are, therefore, one of the most productive and diverse in the world. Their ecological function is decisive as a site of reproduction, refuge and feeding of different species of terrestrial animals such as birds, reptiles and mammals, and marine life, such as molluscs, crustaceans and algae, among others.

Some mangroves are important sanctuaries for the maintenance of some species that are born in nearby ecosystems, such as coral reefs or seagrass beds, which are currently threatened with extinction, such as some species of sea turtles. The main mangrove ecosystems are represented in the List of Wetlands of International Importance, as is the case of Los Roques National Park, which is promoting the conservation, integrated management and sustainable use of its resources (Ramsar Convention, 1988).

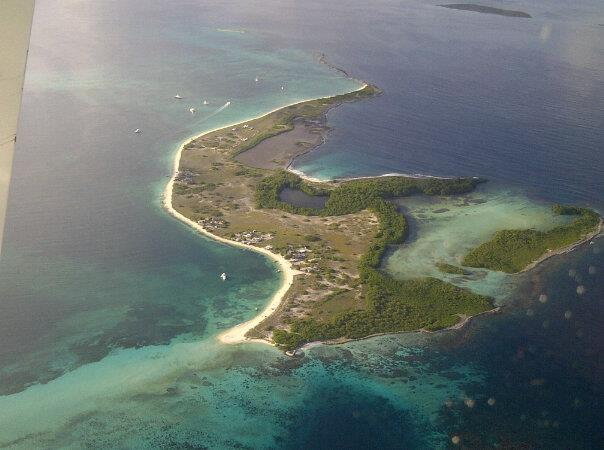
Mangroves in Federal Dependencies

Its width can vary from less than 100 meters to several kilometers. Its apparent homogeneity is reflected by a tree structure arranged in bands, according to the adaptability of the species, the instability of the substrate and salinity. The floristic representatives are the following: the red mangrove (Rhizophora mangle), the black mangrove (Avicenniae germinans), the white mangrove of the family Laguncularia and the button mangrove (Conocarpus erectus). The mangroves of the islands of the Federal Dependencies correspond to geomorphological environments associated with surfaces of recent or old low energy carbonates, of the type of shallow tropical areas. They are located on the coast line and its limit can end abruptly on a cliff or can extend to plains muddy or offshore banks of marine angiosperms. Some researchers point to coral island mangroves as the least productive.

At present, there is no accurate assessment of the distribution and extent of mangroves of the islands of the Federal Dependencies. Those of the archipelago Los Roques are very well-known, where they present/display better development; these are distributed ample and densely in the southeastern part of its islands and cays, represented by the four characteristic species. The predominant species is the red mangrove, followed in importance by the black mangrove.

In the most consolidated and sandy places of the archipelago are sporadically found the white mangrove and the button mangrove. In Aves de Sotavento, in Isla Larga and in some sectors of interior lagoons. In Aves de Barlovento, on Tesoro Island and El Faro, mangrove formations have developed, represented by the four types of mangroves but with less development and coverage than in Los Roques. Small patches of mangrove are also observed in other keys of this archipelago.

In the archipelago La Orchila they are distributed to the north, in the coralline keys mainly, where the formations of red mangrove are abundant and dense. On the island they are located to the southwest, bordering lagoons, represented mostly by button mangrove and some isolated black mangrove. In the eastern and southeastern parts of the country there are quite extensive areas of degraded and underdeveloped mangroves.

On the south coast of La Tortuga Island there are some sectors with Dense strips of red and black mangrove formations, bordering open lagoons protected by sand bars, such as the Los Mogotes and El Carenero lagoons. In other places, they appear in smaller extension like in the lagoon sectors of Boca de Cangrejo and Boca de Palo. In the northeastern coast of the most northern island, Los Tortuguillos, find themselves with little development.

On the island of La Blanquilla they are known in very specific places, in the form of narrow strips and of little development, in the most sheltered parts of the coves Las Tres Playas, El Caño Las Lisas, El Falucho, Garantón and Ño Martín. In these bay bottoms the mangroves are of the species Rhizophora mangle, very particular ecosystem from where most of the crabs of this zone come from.

== Politics and government ==
This federal entity is the only one in the whole Republic that has neither a Governor nor a Mayor, since it has neither the status of a Federal State nor that of an Autonomous Municipality. It is a special administrative division provided for in Article 17 of the Constitution:

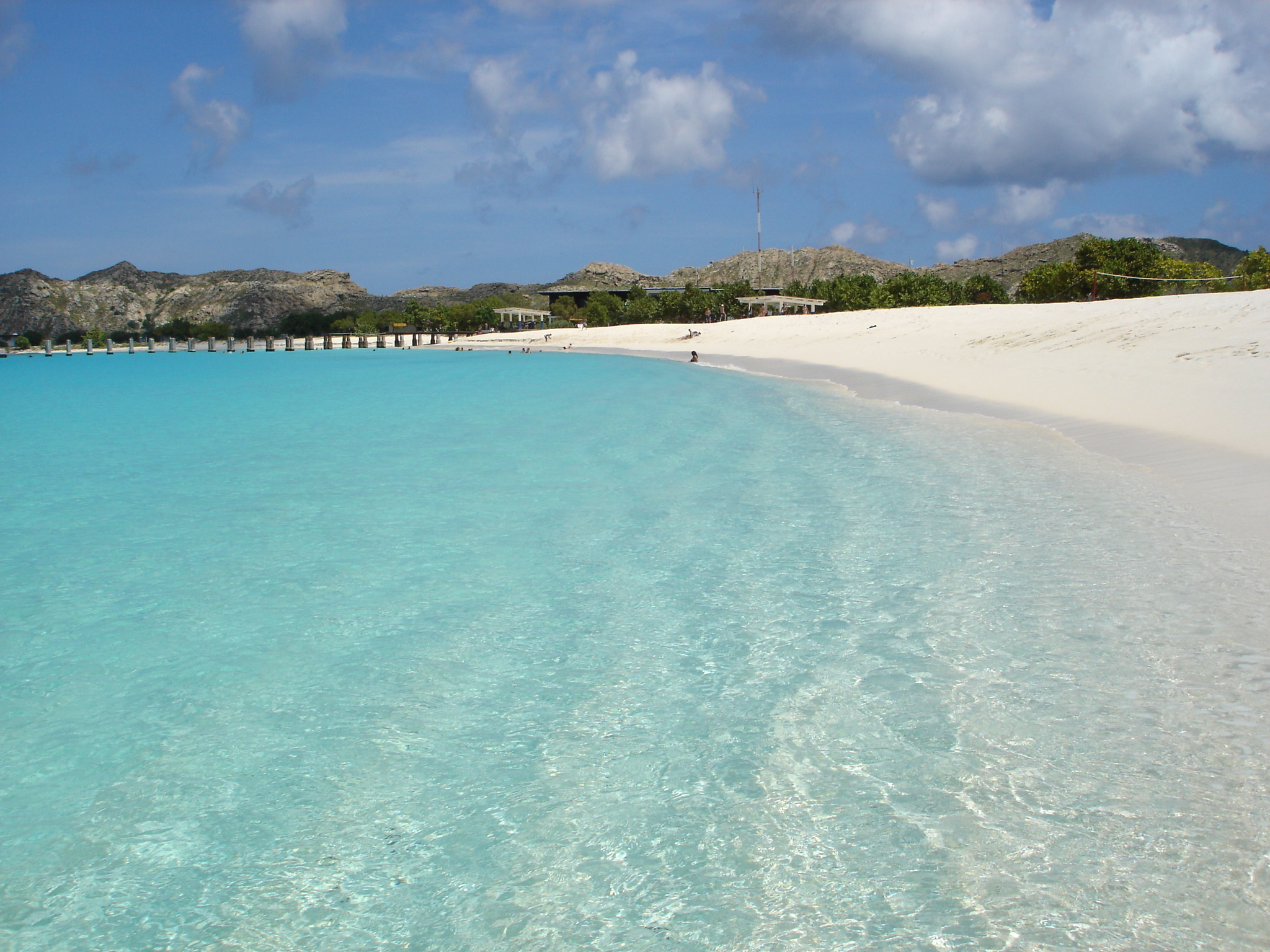
La Orchila is one of the 3 federal dependencies included in the Francisco de Miranda Insular Territory since 2011.

"Federal dependencies are maritime islands not integrated into the territory of a State, as well as islands which are formed or appear in the territorial sea or on the continental shelf. Their description, geographical position, regime and administration shall be set out in the law".

According to the Ley orgánica de las Dependencias Federales (Organic Law on Federal Dependencies) of 1938, in force until 2011, everything related to the government and administration of these Dependencies corresponds directly to the Federal or National Executive (Art.3). They are under the administration of the Dirección Nacional de Coordinación del Desarrollo Fronterizo y de las Dependencias Federales (National Directorate for the Coordination of Border Development and Federal Dependencies).

Even though the Federal Dependencies does not form a federal state, it is part of the Island Region together with the State of Nueva Esparta. Currently, there are several proposals to solve the ambiguous condition of the Federal Dependencies, some currents of thought maintain that the islands should be integrated into the territories of the closest Federal States, and others, that they should be elevated to the category of State within the Federation in order to promote their sustainable development at all levels, without disintegrating the identity they have developed as a geographical and cultural whole.

The populated sites of the Federal Dependencies used to have a General Commissioner appointed by the President of the Republic and in the case of the Los Roques Archipelago this was administered by a Single Area Authority (Created in 1990) also appointed by him, which had jurisdiction over the territory of the national park of the same name until 2011.

Location of the Francisco de Miranda Insular Territory.

On October 15, 2011, the central government of Venezuela issued a decree with the rank, value and force of organic law that created new legislation for the Federal Departments, through a new organic law that repeals the 1938 law and establishes that the political and administrative organization of the departments will be articulated through island territories and minor development districts. On October 27 the law was endorsed by the Supreme Court of Justice and published in Official Gazette 39.787.

In August 2011, the President of the Republic, using his legislative powers, promulgated the law creating the first island territory of the Federal Dependencies, called the Francisco de Miranda Insular Territory, with its capital in Gran Roque, covering the central sector of the Federal Dependencies, which includes Los Roques, the Archipelago of Las Aves and the Archipelago of La Orchila, as well as a large portion of the Venezuelan Caribbean Sea. The new institution is headed by a Head of Government (Jefe de Gobierno) who is freely appointed and removed by the President of Venezuela.

== Tourism ==
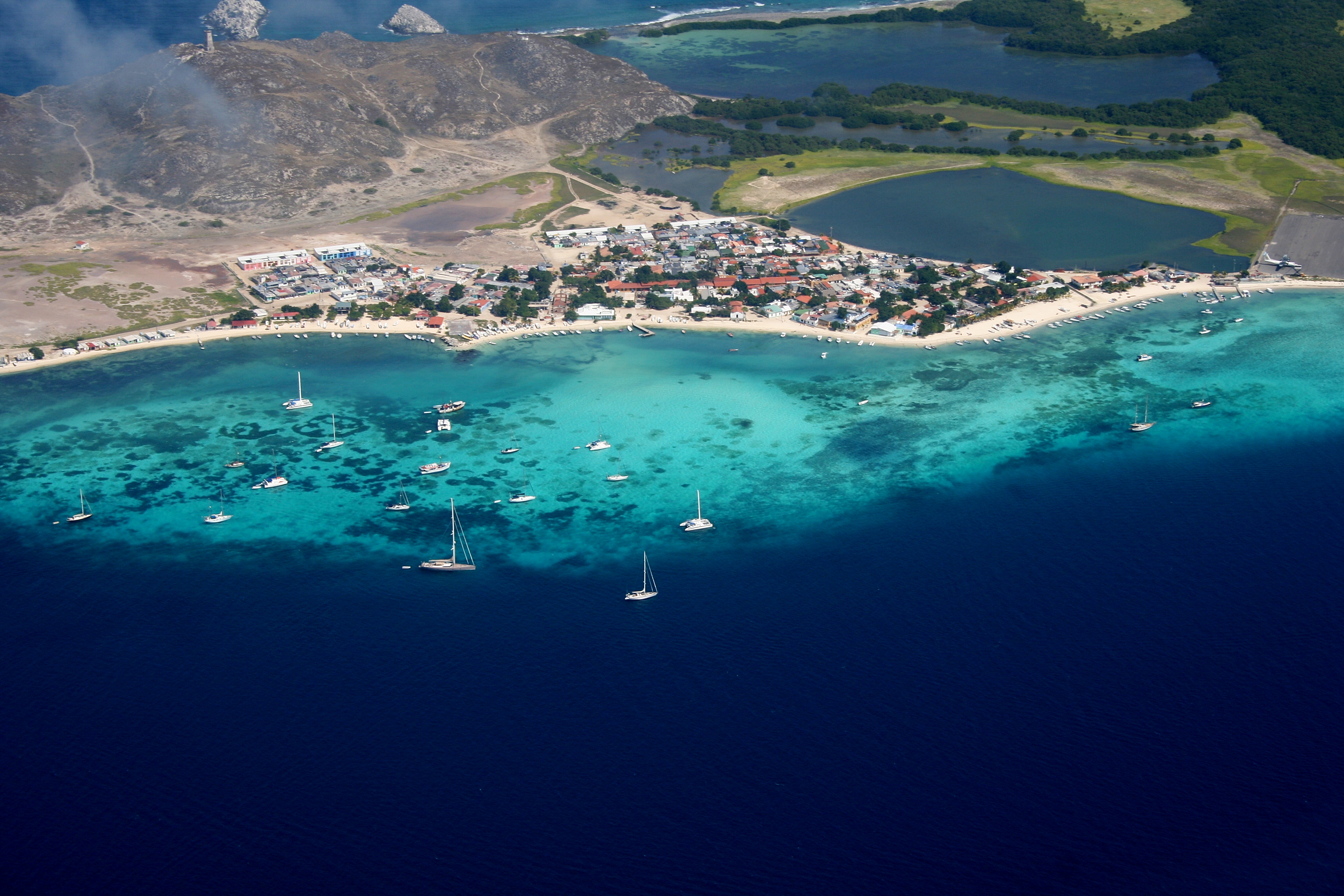
Gran Roque Island, One of the most visited islands of the Federal Dependencies

The Venezuelan islands represent a tourist-recreational potential, with several attractions located inside and outside the mainland, as well as a diversity of tropical beaches and large coral formations.

Los Roques Archipelago, together with Aves Island and La Orchila Island form the "oceanic islands", separated from the continental platform by deep channels and bathed by warm and transparent oceanic waters. Los Roques has been one of the areas that has presented greater development of its tourist services, hence its importance as a centre of recreation for foreigners and Venezuelans.

El Gran Roque is the only centre that has some infrastructure for tourist accommodation, although recently plans have been approved to create tourist developments on uninhabited islands such as La Tortuga Island.

=== Beaches ===
The sandy beaches are ecosystems of unconsolidated sedimentary environments, they host a large number of animals and plants that depend on the processes of the coastal dynamics. The beaches are home to diatoms, algae, mollusks and planktonic organisms that serve as a food base for the species that frequent them.

In the sedimentary ecosystems of beaches associated with sea grass ecosystems, nesting phenomena of sea turtles also occur. In this sense, Aves Island is one of the most important green turtle nesting sites in the Caribbean Sea. On the other hand, as a whole, the white sand beaches of the reef complexes of Las Aves and Los Roques are qualified as the main attraction of the tourist offer of the Venezuelan Caribbean.

The beaches of La Tortuga Island are varied, with sand spits and points forming parts of the coastline. The island's beach ecosystems take several forms and cover large areas along the eastern coast.

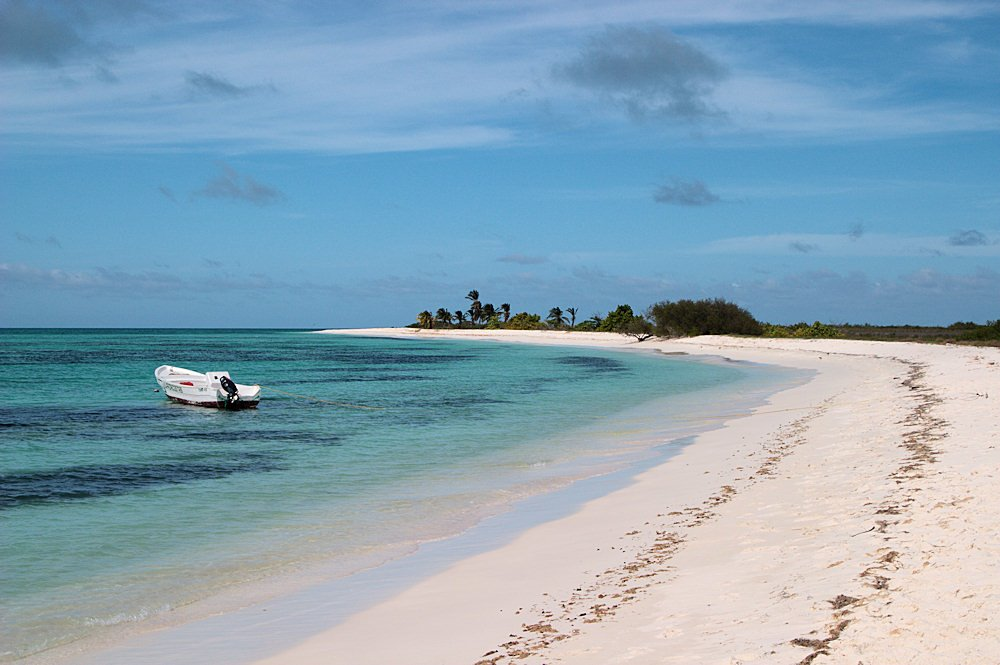
Beaches of Las Aves Archipelago east of Bonaire and west of Los Roques

Associated with a rocky coastal relief, the beaches often occupy bottom positions of cove or inlet, where a harmonious arch develops between the cliffs that serve as support. This is the case of all the beaches on the island of La Blanquilla and in some sectors of La Orchila. This type of beach, also known as "pocket beach", develops in the sheltered areas of the slopes The island is located on the eastern side of Iguana Island, on the eastern slope of the island, and on the rocky and cliffy Los Testigos archipelago.

Another sedimentary environment is the coastal dunes that are formed by the wind, whose development is linked to the growth of plants that fix the sand that the wind brings from the beach. The dunes represent natural sedimentary pantries, with respect to their sandy beaches and form recreational areas, normally of high landscape value. On La Tortuga Island they have developed extensively on the west coast, but are low in height.

In contrast, in the Los Testigos archipelago, specifically in Testigo Grande, there is a small but imposing dune of 100 meters high. Also to the interior of the island La Orchila exist great extensions of relict dunes, colonized and stabilized by vegetation. The main pressures and threats to the beach ecosystem of most of these islands is the lack of a coastal management that establishes regulations for its sustainable management. Only Los Roques National Park and, recently, La Tortuga Island have management plans.

=== Protected areas ===
==== Los Roques Archipelago National Park ====
The archipelago Los Roques is an extensive group of islands located north of the Venezuelan coast, formed by fifty islets and more than three hundred keys and banks of sand. To protect its scenic environment of transparent waters and white sands, as well as its valuable biodiversity, it was declared a national park in 1972, and as a wetland of international importance in 1996.

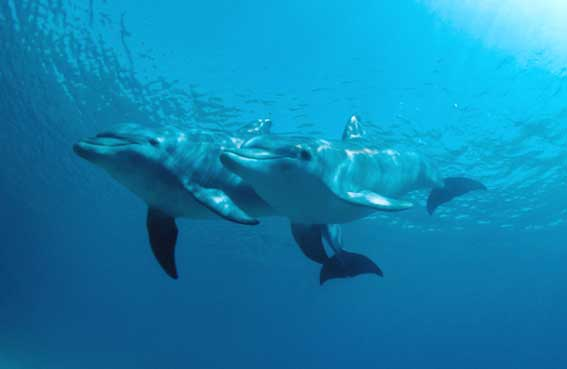
Dolphins in Los Roques Archipelago National Park

With two coral reefs and hundreds of keys and islands that border a large inland lagoon of shallow water, the Los Roques archipelago resembles a volcanic atoll in the Pacific Ocean and constitutes an unparalleled formation in the Atlantic. The keys have picturesque names related to the Dutch who in the past exploited the guano of the birds: Francisquí, Crasquí, Madrisquí or Noronquí. The largest key (Cayo grande) is 17 km^{2}, while the Gran Roque, with only 1.7 km^{2}, is the only one with a permanent population. In the Dos Mosquises key there is a biological station.

The high solar radiation, the extreme heat and the not very fertile soil, only allow the existence of small plant communities known as halophytes, some cactus and small shrubs. In several cays, elegant mangroves thrive in whose branches nest sea birds, while its roots serve as a refuge for fish, oysters, starfish and sponges. In the shallow waters grow extensive seagrass meadows of great importance for snails, fish and turtles.

More than half of the ninety-two species of birds reported in Los Roques are migratory, and many of them arrive from North America. Twenty-four species of birds nest in the archipelago, including pelicans, gulls, cotúas, playeritos, bobas and flamingos, and six endemic subspecies, such as the black queen roqueña. The terrestrial mammals and reptiles are represented by the fishing bat and very tame black lizards.

The sea in Los Roques is suitable for divers. Invertebrates that populate these waters include corals, jellyfish, anemones, sponges, sea urchins, starfish, crustaceans, and mollusks, as well as lobsters and botutos. Dolphins and whales are also present. The white beaches host a colony of hawksbill turtles, along with three other nesting species of sea turtles. The area contains 350 species of reef fish and fish consumed by humans, including isabelites, parrot fish, groupers, and the whale shark, which can measure up to twelve meters in length.

In the past, the islets were frequently visited by indigenous people who came from the mainland in search of fish, turtles, botutos and salt. There is evidence that they practiced ritual ceremonies during their stays. In Dos Mosquises there is an important archaeological site where hundreds of valuable objects have been unearthed, including anthropomorphic clay figures.

== See also ==
- Administrative divisions of Venezuela
- Federal Territories of Venezuela
- Insular Region
- Nueva Esparta
