= Los Testigos Islands =

Group of islands in the southeastern Caribbean Sea

Los Testigos
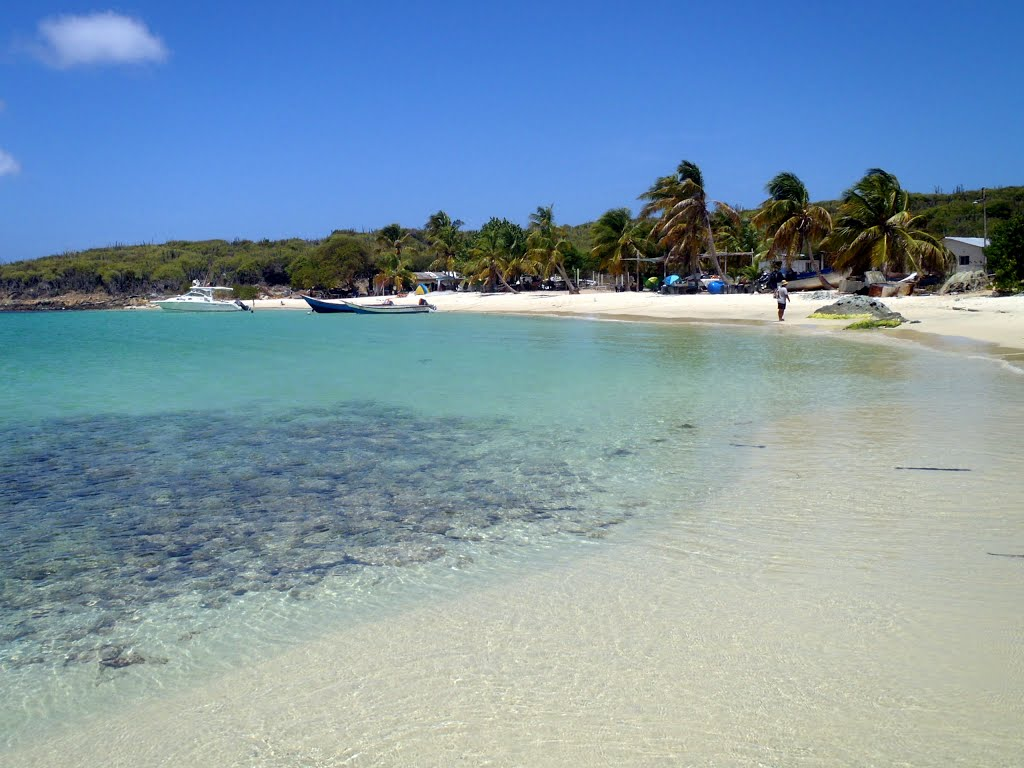
- Los Testigos Islands
- Interactive map of Los Testigos

Geography
- Location: Caribbean Sea
- Coordinates: 11°22′59″N 63°05′50″W

Administration
- Venezuela
- Federal dependencies of Venezuela

Los Testigos Islands (Spanish: Islas Los Testigos, Witnesses Islands) are a group of islands in the southeastern Caribbean Sea. They are a part of the Dependencias Federales (Federal Dependencies) of Venezuela.

== Geography ==
The Los Testigos Islands are located about 400 km (250 mi) northeast of Caracas and about 80 km (50 mi) northeast of Isla Margarita. The coordinates of the main island are 11°22′59″N 63°05′50″W. The archipelago has an area of 6.53 square km (2.52 square miles) (1) and consists of 6 major islands and a number of smaller rock islets.

The larger islands are:

- Isla Testigo Grande, main island
- Isla Conejo, east of the main island
- Isla Iguana, south of the main island
- Isla Morro Blanco, south of the main island
- Isla Noreste, northeast of the main island
- Isla Rajado, east of the main island

The larger rock islets are:

- El Chivo
- Peñón de Fuera

The population is about 200 inhabitants (according to 2001 census) mostly being fishing families. There is a small military base operated by the Venezuelan navy on the main island.

== History ==
In 1938, the islands were put under the administration of the Ministerio del Interior y de Justicia (Ministry of Interior and Justice) (2) as part of the Dependencias Federales.

On August 9, 1972, the islands, together with the other islands of the Dependencias Federales, were declared a national park (3) with the park being established on August 18.

== See also ==
- Federal Dependencies of Venezuela
- List of marine molluscs of Venezuela
- List of Poriferans of Venezuela
