= Los Frailes Archipelago =

Archipelago of rock islets of Venezuela

Coordinates: 11°12′N 63°45′W

Los Frailes
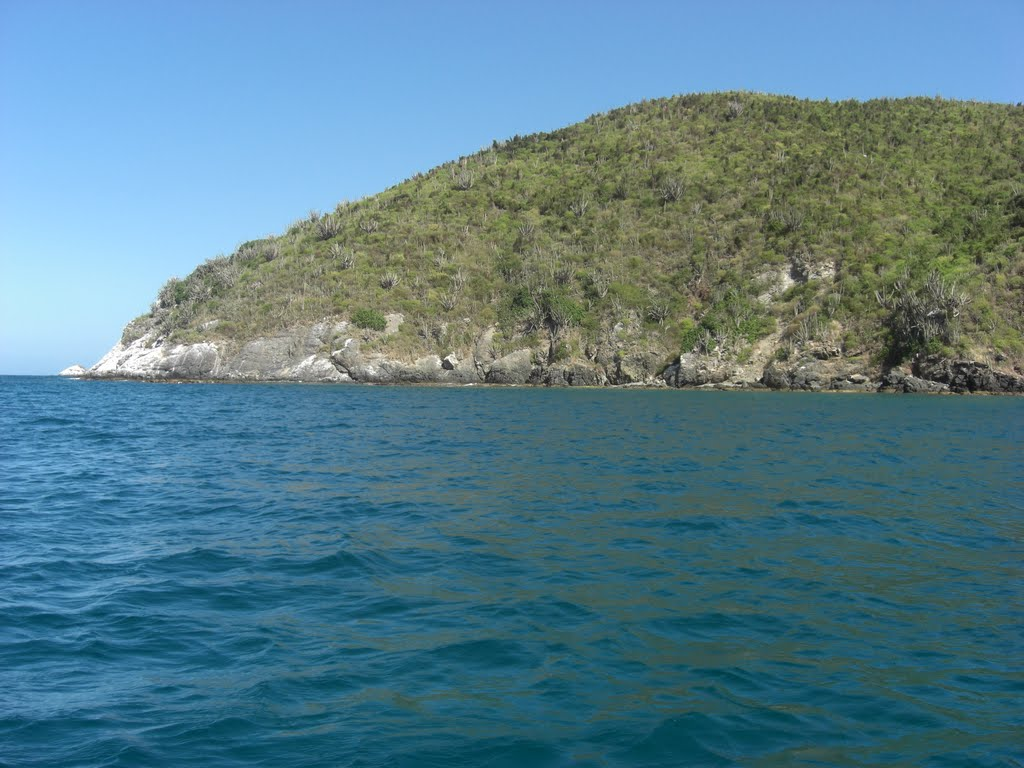
- Los Frailes
- Interactive map of Los Frailes

Geography
- Location: Caribbean sea
- Archipelago: Los Frailes
- Total islands: 10
- Major islands: Isla Fraile Grande
- Area: 1.92 km^{2} (0.74 sq mi)

Administration
- Venezuela
- Status: Federal Dependency

Demographics
- Population: 6 (approximately)

The Islas Los Frailes are an archipelago of rock islets with sparse scrub vegetation belonging to the Federal dependencies of Venezuela, part of Venezuela.

The flotilla of Spanish explorer Alonso de Ojeda sighted in 1499 the archipelago composed of ten islands:

- Chepere
- Guacaraida
- Isla Fraile Grande
- Nabobo
- Cominoto
- Macarare
- Guairiare
- Guacaraida
- La Balandra
- La Peche

The largest island is called Fraile Grande or Puerto Real and is 2,200 metres (7,218 ft) long and occupies 1.92 km^{2} (0.74 sq mi). The southern islet has an elevation of 91 m (299 ft). About eight kilometres (5.0 mi) north of Los Failes is Roca del Norte (North Rock), which is 3 m (10 ft) high.

== See also ==
- Federal Dependencies of Venezuela
- List of marine molluscs of Venezuela
- List of Poriferans of Venezuela
