= Los Monjes Archipelago =

Federal dependency of Venezuela

Los Monjes
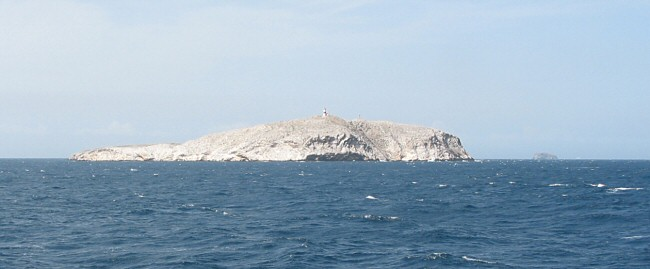
- Los Monjes
- Interactive map of Los Monjes

Geography
- Location: Caribbean Sea
- Coordinates: 12°22′N 70°54′W
- Area: 0.24 km^{2} (0.093 sq mi)
- Highest elevation: 72 m (236 ft)

Administration
- Venezuela
- Status: Federal Dependency

The Los Monjes islands (Spanish: Archipiélago Los Monjes) is a federal dependency of Venezuela are located to the northwest 80 kilometres (49.7 miles) of the Gulf of Venezuela, 34.8 kilometres (21.6 miles) off the coast of Guajira Peninsula at the border between Colombia and the Venezuelan state of Zulia.

== History ==
It is believed that they were discovered by the Spanish explorer Alonso de Ojeda in 1499, who named the islands after the similarity of the rock formations to the hoods worn by monks. This archipelago and the unwillingness of the governments of Colombia and Venezuela to define their maritime boundaries has generated diplomatic friction between the two nations.

With the Michelena-Pombo Treaty of 1833, the Guajira Peninsula was divided longitudinally between Venezuela and Colombia. However, the Venezuelan Congress refused to ratify that document because it was considered unfavorable to the nation in several of its parts.

In 1856, Venezuela protested Colombia's attempt to grant a guano concession, which finally did not materialize.

On August 22, 1871, the Venezuelan government included the islands as part of "Territorio Colón" (along with other archipelagos such as Los Roques, or islands such as La Tortuga), an entity that organized the islands that were not incorporated into the Venezuelan states but belonged to their territory.

In 1891, Queen María Cristina of Spain issued an arbitration ruling recognizing Colombia's ownership of almost the entire Guajira Peninsula based on the 1777 and 1790 decrees on the segregation of Maracaibo and Sinamaica, stating that all differences over boundaries were terminated.

In 1922, a Swiss arbitration decision reiterated the previous terms.

In July 1938, the Organic Law was approved by which Venezuela included the territory as part of the Federal Dependencies.

In 1952, the Colombian president in charge, Roberto Urdaneta Arbeláez, through his foreign minister Juan Uribe Holguín, in response to a claim by Venezuela, recognized Venezuelan sovereignty over Los Monjes through a diplomatic note (GM-542):

"The Government of Colombia declares that it does not object to the sovereignty of the United States of Venezuela over the Los Monjes Archipelago and that consequently it does not object to the exercise of that sovereignty, or to any act of claim that it may make with respect to the exercise of that sovereignty, or to any act of domination by that country over the archipelago in question."

The Venezuelan government, through its ambassador Luis Gerónimo Pietri, thanked for the recognition and on November 29, 1952, the Venezuelan flag was raised on the islands, with which the government of the Venezuelan general Marcos Pérez Jiménez ended the matter and began the effective occupation of the group of islands by Venezuela, installing a scientific-military observatory.

On March 31, 1978, the Maritime Boundary Treaty between the Netherlands and Venezuela was signed, establishing the maritime border between Venezuela and the island of Aruba, which at that time belonged to the Netherlands Antilles, using the Los Monjes archipelago as a reference base.

On August 9, 1987 the frigate ARC Caldas of the Colombian Navy sailed in undefined waters of the Gulf that Venezuela considers its own, very close to the archipelago, which caused strong tension between both countries and military mobilization by both governments that included in the Venezuelan case: the F-16 fighters, later the Colombian frigate withdrew from the area without fighting.

On October 22, 1992, the Colombian Council of State issued a ruling rejecting the objections regarding lack of jurisdiction and res judicata, and declaring null and void Diplomatic Note GM-542 of November 22, 1952, concerning the recognition of Los Monjes as part of Venezuela.

On January 22, 1999, the then President of Venezuela, Rafael Caldera, almost at the end of his second term of office (1994-1999), inaugurated the works that allowed the union of the two main islands located to the south of the Monks' archipelago, by creating an artificial rock bridge with land gained from the sea, using the material obtained from blasting in the islands themselves, as well as inaugurating a security port.

== Geography ==
The islands consist of rocks rising steeply out of the sea, without any beaches or natural landing. The Venezuelan Navy maintains a base on El Sur, where it constructed a pier. The islands have no natural resources and must be supplied from the mainland. Fishing is the main activity around the islands, usually by fishing boats making the short trip from Guajira and the Paraguaná Peninsula.

There are three islands or island groups, with a total area of 0.2 km^{2} (0.1 sq mi):

- Monjes del Sur (12°22′N 70°54′W) consists of the two largest islands, connected by an artificial dam. The southern of the two islands reaches a height of 70 metres (230 ft) and has a lighthouse.
- Monjes del Este (12°24′N 70°51′W), a small rock 5.3 km (3.3 mi) northeast of Monjes del Sur, reaches a height of 43 metres (141 ft).
- Monjes del Norte (12°30′N 70°55′W), is 12.3 km (7.6 mi) NNW of Monjes del Este, and consists of five small rocks, the largest one of which reaches a height of 41 metres (135 ft).

In 2012 the Bolivarian Navy of Venezuela named a Damen Stan Lander 5612 landing craft after the islands.

== See also ==
- Federal Dependencies of Venezuela
- List of marine molluscs of Venezuela
- List of Poriferans of Venezuela
