= La Tortuga Island =

Federal dependency of Venezuela

Native name: Isla La Tortuga
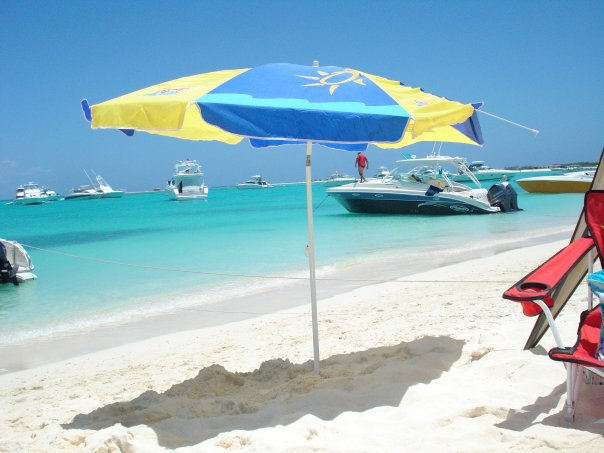
- A beach on La Tortuga island
- Interactive map of La Tortuga Island

Geography
- Location: Caribbean Sea
- Coordinates: 10°55′54″N 65°18′29″W
- Major islands: 1
- Area: 156.60 km^{2} (60.46 sq mi)
- Highest elevation: 45 m (148 ft)
- Highest point: Altos de Garambeo

Administration
- Venezuela
- Federal dependencies of Venezuela

La Tortuga Island (Spanish: Isla La Tortuga; "La Tortuga" means literally "the turtle") is an uninhabited island of Venezuela, the largest in the Federal Dependencies of Venezuela. It is part of a group of islands that include the Tortuguillos and Cayo Herradura. Isla La Tortuga has an area of 156 km^{2} (60 sq mi).

== History ==
The island was visited by Amerindians from the coast of present-day Venezuela to exploit its natural resources including salt, fish and turtles, well before Spanish colonization of the New World. It is not known by which European explorer the island was first seen and named, yet the name derives from the large numbers of marine turtles that come to lay eggs on its long sandy beaches every year.

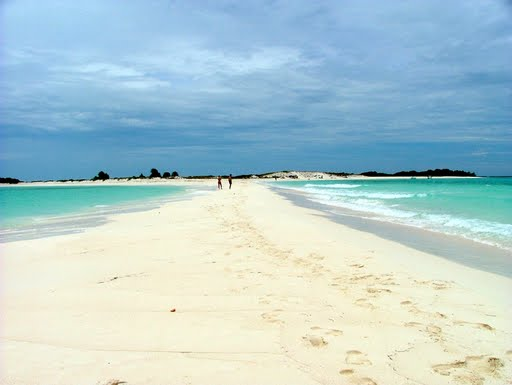
Cayo Herradura

The island was seasonally visited by the Dutch who came there to exploit the salt evaporation ponds on the east of the island between 1624 and 1638. They constructed a fort on the island to guard their salt works and repel the Spanish who were eager to keep the Dutch off the island. They were definitively expelled in 1638 when the Spanish governor of Cumaná, Benito Arias Montano, and his forces destroyed their facilities and flooded the salt pans.

Since then, with the exception of fishermen who visit the island seasonally, the island has remained unpopulated and largely untouched. There is some tourism on the island.

== Gallery ==
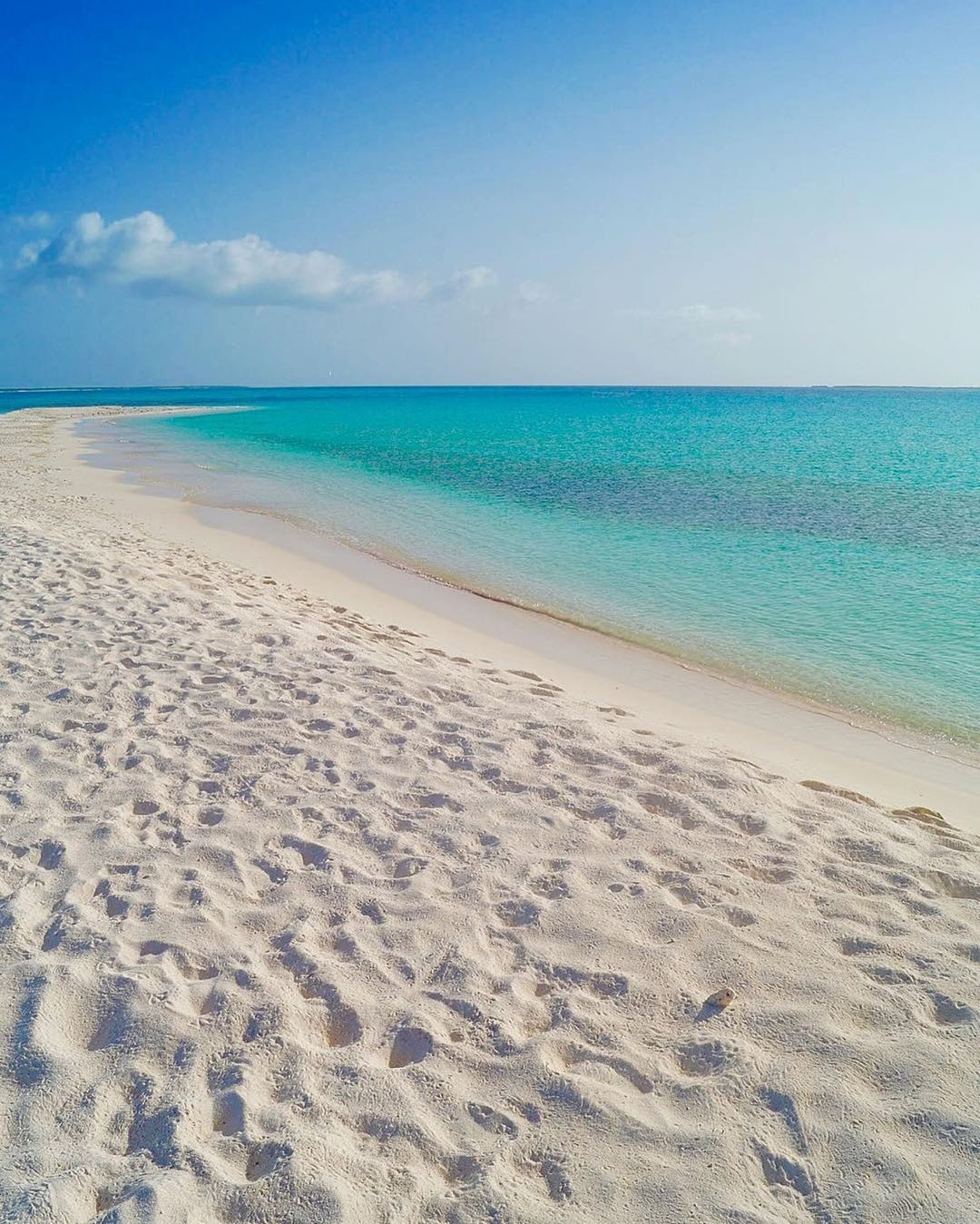

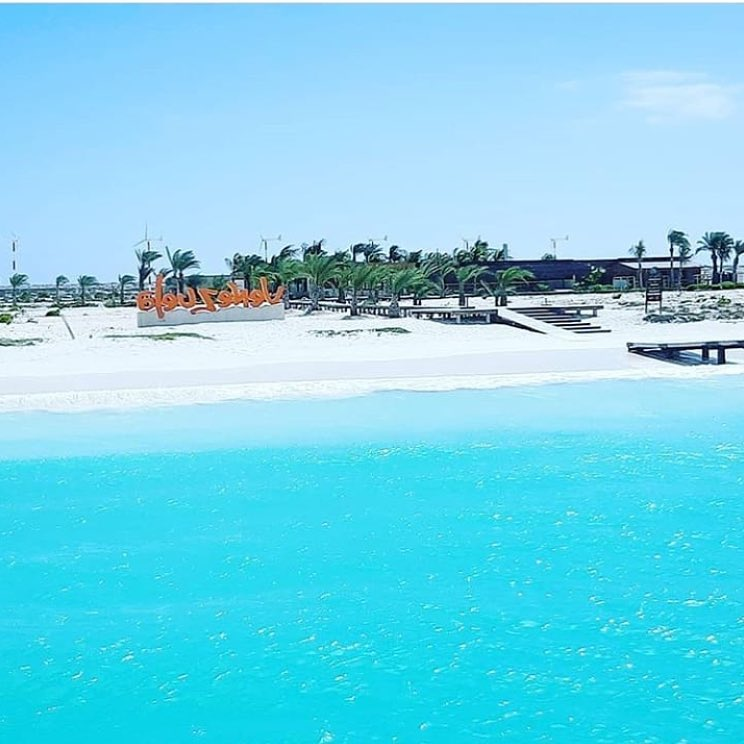

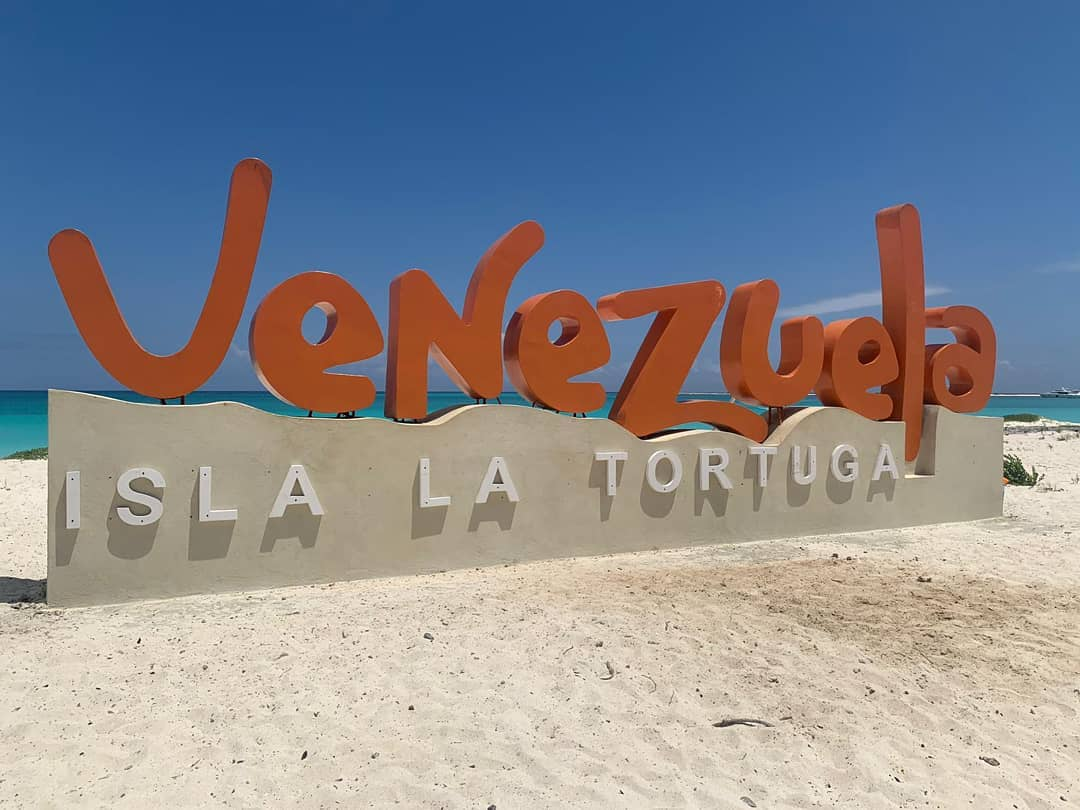

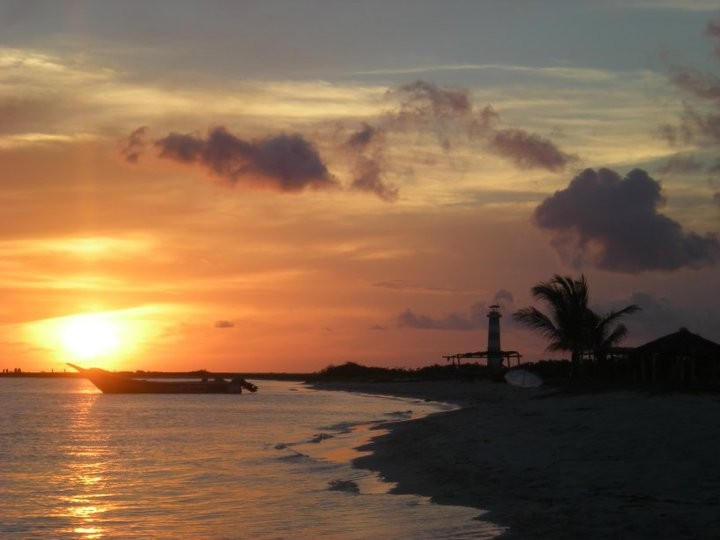

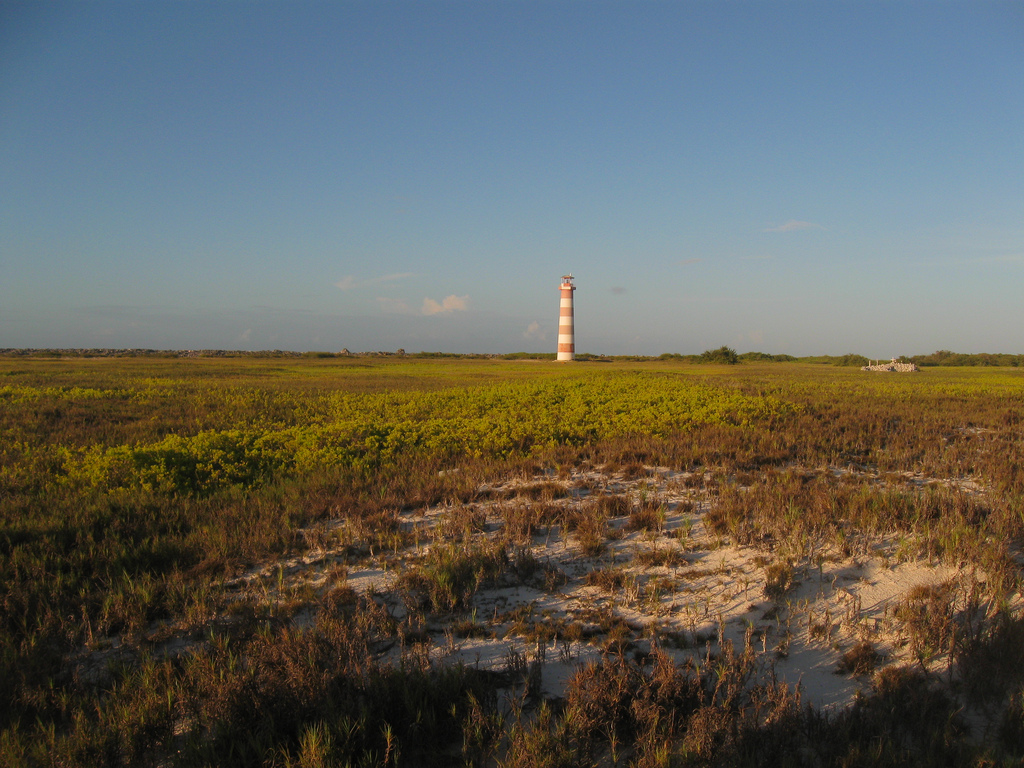

== See also ==
- Federal Dependencies of Venezuela
- List of marine molluscs of Venezuela
- List of Poriferans of Venezuela
- Cariaco Basin
