= Missoni (surname) =

Missoni is an Italian surname. Notable people with the surname include:

- Eduardo Missoni (born 1954), Italian medical doctor
- Margherita Missoni (born 1983), Italian fashion designer, model and actress
- Ottavio Missoni (1921–2013), Italian founder of the fashion label Missoni
- Roberta Missoni (born Floriana Panella in 1980), Italian pornographic actress
- Rosita Missoni (1931–2025), Italian knitwear designer, wife of Ottavio
- Vittorio Missoni (1954–2013), Italian CEO of Missoni, the fashion house founded by Ottavio Missoni

== See also ==
- Missoni, high-end Italian fashion house
