= List of accidents and incidents involving general aviation =

This list of accidents and incidents involving general aviation is grouped by the years in which the accidents or incidents occurred. "General aviation" here includes private as well as corporate aircraft operating under general aviation rules,^{[note A]} i.e. not flights of airliners, commuter or military aircraft.

Overall, this is an incomplete listing, but is intended to be a complete listing of notable accidents and incidents with Wikipedia articles and those involving notable persons with Wikipedia articles. For more exhaustive lists, see the Crash Record Office or the Aviation Safety Network.

== Introduction ==
=== General aviation safety in America ===
The number of deaths per passenger-mile on commercial airlines in the United States between 2000 and 2010 was about 0.2 deaths per 10 billion passenger-miles. For driving, the rate was 150 per 10 billion vehicle-miles for 2000 : 750 times higher per mile than for flying in a commercial airplane.

=== General aviation safety in Europe ===
About three accidents per day are reported in Europe. As the reporting of every GA accident and incident is not mandatory everywhere, these figures may be higher. However, most major accidents are likely to be reflected due to involvement of outside authorities. The European Union Aviation Safety Agency (EASA) and the national civil aviation authorities support and encourage the collection of light aircraft accident data in order to provide more in-depth statistics and analysis.

In the UK, there were 27 fatal accidents involving GA aircraft in 2007, resulting in the loss of 48 lives. This compares with 16 accidents claiming a total of 19 lives the previous year, and although the 2007 statistics are higher than average, they are not exceptional.

In 2018, 12 persons were killed in general aviation accidents involving EU-registered aircraft with a MTOM above 2250 kg, an increase of around 70 % compared to the previous year where 7 fatalities were recorded. Since 2006, it is only the second time that more than 10 fatalities were registered from accidents on EU territory involving such large aircraft registered in the EU. In 2013, there were 11 fatalities registered in such accidents.

For light general aviation, i.e. involving aircraft under 2250 kg MTOM, 159 persons lost their lives in accidents with EU-registered aircraft within the EU-28 territory in 2018. This category includes, in addition to smaller aeroplanes, balloons, dirigibles, para- and motorgliders, microlights and small helicopters. EASA’s Annual Safety Review notes that most fatalities occur in accidents with small aeroplanes (especially during the landing phase) and gliders.

— EASA

Killed in aviation accident, 2014–2018, source Eurostat. View chart definition.
Aircraft under 2250 kg MTOM, 2014–2018, source Eurostat. View chart definition.

== 1912 ==
- May 13 – A Flanders Monoplane crashed at Brooklands, England, killing the pilot and his passenger. The accident was investigated by the Royal Aero Club, which issued the first-ever report into an aviation accident and established the science of aviation accident investigation.

== 1935 ==
- August 15 – Wiley Post and passenger Will Rogers died in the crash of Post's modified seaplane en route from Fairbanks, Alaska, to Point Barrow, Alaska, while taking off from a lagoon, after landing to ask for directions.

== 1937 ==
- July 2 – Amelia Earhart and navigator Fred Noonan disappeared over the central Pacific Ocean en route in a Lockheed Electra 10E to Howland Island during an attempt to circumnavigate the world.

== 1952 ==
- June 28 – A private Temco Swift collided with American Airlines Flight 910, a Douglas DC-6 on final approach to Dallas Love Field. The pilot and single passenger aboard the Swift were killed on impact with the ground; the DC-6 made a safe landing with no injuries to the 55 passengers and five crew.

== 1959 ==
- February 3 – A Beechcraft Bonanza carrying musicians Buddy Holly, Ritchie Valens, and Jiles Richardson crashed near Clear Lake, Iowa in what become known as The Day the Music Died.

== 1963 ==
- March 5 – A Piper PA-24 Comanche carrying country music performers Patsy Cline, Cowboy Copas, and Hawkshaw Hawkins crashed during a flight to Nashville, Tennessee, killing all four on board the aircraft.

== 1964 ==
- July 31 – A Beechcraft Debonair piloted by country musician and songwriter Jim Reeves crashed on a flight from Batesville, Arkansas to Nashville, Tennessee, killing Reeves and his manager/pianist.

== 1969 ==
- August 31 – A Cessna 172 carrying former world heavyweight boxing champion Rocky Marciano crashed in Newton, Iowa, killing Marciano, the pilot, and another passenger.

== 1971 ==
- May 28 – An Aero Commander 680 Super crashed near Roanoke, Virginia, killing highly decorated World War II veteran Audie Murphy and five others on board.

== 1972 ==
- October 16 – A twin-engine Cessna 310 carrying U.S. Representative Nick Begich of Alaska and House Majority Leader Hale Boggs of Louisiana disappeared during a flight from Anchorage, Alaska to Juneau, Alaska. An unsuccessful 39-day search was called off on November 24; the aircraft's wreckage and Begich and Boggs' bodies were never found.
- December 31 – Baseball player Roberto Clemente died when his chartered Douglas DC-7 crashed into the ocean off Isla Verde, Puerto Rico, immediately after takeoff.

== 1973 ==
- January 22 – The personal Piaggio P.136L-2 airplane of Alexander Onassis crashed at Ellinikon International Airport in Athens, Greece. A few seconds after takeoff from runway 33, the plane's right wing dropped and stayed down, and the plane crashed shortly after losing balance. The pilot, Donald McCusker, and another passenger both suffered serious injuries in the crash, and Onassis died the next day from his injuries. Reports into the crash concluded that it had occurred as a result of the reversing of the aileron connecting cables during the installation of a new control column. Manslaughter proceedings initiated against McCusker were later dropped, and six people were also charged over Onassis's death in January 1974, with their indictment indicating that faulty controls had been fitted to his plane. Onassis's father, Aristotle Onassis refused to believe his son's death was an accident.
- September 20 – Musicians Jim Croce and Maury Muehleisen were killed in a Beechcraft E18S due to fly from Natchitoches, Louisiana to Sherman, Texas. The plane crashed into trees shortly after takeoff from Natchitoches Regional Airport.

== 1974 ==
- February 16 – a Beechcraft Baron aircraft registered VH-FWR disappeared on a flight from Gladstone to Longreach in Australia.
- April 18 – A Piper PA-23 Aztec entered an active runway at Luton Airport and was struck by a Court Line BAC One-Eleven taking off. The pilot on board the Aztec were killed and his passenger was injured. All 91 people on board the One-Eleven survived after the take-off was aborted.

== 1977 ==
- August 1 – A Bell 206B news helicopter piloted by Francis Gary Powers crashed in a park near Encino, Los Angeles due to fuel starvation.

== 1979 ==
- August 2 – Cessna 501, N15NY. Thurman Munson, catcher for the New York Yankees, died in a crash of his personal jet while practicing touch-and-go landings at Akron-Canton Regional Airport.
- August 24 – A Stearman biplane, aircraft registration number N48784, flew into electrical transmission lines that cross Lake Natoma at Mississippi Bar. Jacquelyn Burnett, a passenger in the biplane, was killed. The pilot, Stephen Francis Williams, was convicted of manslaughter. His conviction marked the first time in United States history that a pilot was held criminally responsible for the death of a passenger. Williams had previously killed his own 12-year-old daughter, Patricia Ann Williams, by attempting a takeoff in dense fog at the Salinas Municipal Airport.

== 1981 ==
- August 9 – Cessna 210M VH-MDX disappeared in the Barrington Tops National Park area.

== 1985 ==
- December 31 – Popular singer and actor Ricky Nelson and six others died in a Douglas DC-3 near De Kalb, Texas, United States during an off-airport emergency landing attempt prompted by dense smoke in the cabin; the aircraft struck trees and utility poles, suffering severe damage and bursting into flames. The National Transportation Safety Board was unable to verify the origin of the smoke, stating in the final report that "... the ignition and fuel source were not determined."

== 1987 ==
- May 28 – Mathias Rust flew illegally into Soviet airspace in a Cessna 172 and landed in Moscow's Red Square.

== 1990 ==
- August 27 – A Bell 206B Jet Ranger helicopter crashed into a hillside in low visibility soon after takeoff near East Troy, Wisconsin, United States, killing influential American blues guitarist Stevie Ray Vaughan and four others.

== 1991 ==
- October 25 – Bill Graham and two other people were killed when their Bell 206 crashed in poor weather west of Vallejo, California.

== 1993 ==
- April 19 – After a propeller blade separation during cruise, a Mitsubishi MU-2B-60 crashed into a farm silo in low visibility about 8 miles (13 km) south of Dubuque, Iowa, killing Governor of South Dakota George S. Mickelson and seven others. Later that April, investigators' findings prompted the U.S. Federal Aviation Administration (FAA) to order the immediate inspection of Hartzell propellers similar to those on the accident aircraft. The accident was attributed to metal fatigue of the propeller hub caused by improper design and manufacturing.

== 1996 ==
- April 11 – Cessna 177B, N35207. Jessica Dubroff, a seven-year-old pilot trainee who was attempting to become the youngest person to fly an airplane across the United States, died when her aircraft crashed after takeoff from Cheyenne Regional Airport in Cheyenne, Wyoming.
- December 24 – A Learjet 35A crashed near Lebanon, New Hampshire which led to the longest missing aircraft search in that state's history, lasting almost three years.

== 1997 ==
- October 12 – singer-songwriter John Denver was killed when the Long-EZ aircraft he was piloting crashed just off the coast of California at Pacific Grove, California, shortly after taking off from the Monterey Peninsula Airport.

== 1999 ==
- March 23 – Stanford graduate and multi-talented test pilot for Cirrus Aircraft, Scott D. Anderson, was killed in a plane crash while flight-testing the Cirrus SR20 before it went on sale. The problem occurred when his plane experienced an aileron jam during experimental stress-testing. He went down in the yard of a prison approximately 400 meters from the Duluth International Airport.
- July 16 – John F. Kennedy Jr and passengers, wife Carolyn Bessette and sister-in-law Lauren Bessette, were killed when the Piper PA-32R-301 Saratoga II he was piloting, registration number N9253N, crashed into the Atlantic Ocean during a flight from Fairfield Township, Essex County, New Jersey bound for Martha's Vineyard, Massachusetts. The National Transportation Safety Board determined the crash was caused by: "the pilot's failure to maintain control of the airplane during a descent over water at night, which was a result of spatial disorientation".
- August 7 – Pulitzer Prize–winning publisher Ted Natt boarded a helicopter from Oysterville, Washington to Kelso, Washington, which later crashed six miles east of Knappa, Oregon. The crash was not discovered until September 11.
- October 25 – A Learjet 35 flying between Orlando, Florida and Dallas, Texas crashed after flying for almost four hours and 1,500 miles (2,400 km), until it ran out of fuel. Among the six people on board were golf star Payne Stewart and Bruce Borland.

== 2000 ==
- October 6 – A Mitsubishi MU-2B-26A crashed in a wooded area short of Martha's Vineyard Airport in Edgartown, Massachusetts during a landing approach in low visibility, killing pilot and former New Jersey State Senator Charles B. Yates, his wife, and two of their children. The crash was attributed to the pilot's failure to follow instrument flight procedures.

== 2002 ==
- January 5 – A Cessna 172 stolen and flown by a teenager crashed into the side of the Bank of America Tower in downtown Tampa, Florida.
- April 18 – A Rockwell Commander A112 crashed into the Pirelli Tower in Milan, Italy.
- July 10 – A Sikorsky H-34 crashed and sank into the Brookville Reservoir in Brookville, Indiana. The pilot Steve Myler and co-pilot Joseph Rukazina, both made it out while the mechanic Michael Jarski lost his life.

== 2003 ==
- March 5 – at Saint-Forget, France a Socata Rallye MS.892 (registered as F-BLSO) collided midair with a Cessna F150 (registered as F-BSIQ) killing the instructor and student pilot in the latter aircraft. After investigation, the BEA called for obligatory use of transponders in a large zone around Paris.
- July 21 – a South African registered aircraft, carrying 12 passengers and two crew, crashed into Mount Kenya: there were no survivors.
- October 10 - A Utva 75 crashed after suffering left wing damage when it got shot midair by revolver bullets fired by the guests of the traditional wedding in Ratina, Serbia. The aircraft crashed into overhead power-cables, seriously injuring two on board.
- December 17 – Scaled Composites SpaceShipOne suffered a collapsed landing gear and a runway excursion during a freefall flight prior to its space launches.

== 2004 ==
- October 24 – a Beechcraft Super King Air aircraft, registered N501RH[2] and owned by Hendrick Motorsports, crashed into mountainous terrain in Stuart, Virginia, during a missed approach to Blue Ridge Airport. All ten people on board were killed; among them, members of the Hendrick family including John Hendrick, president of Hendrick Motorsports, and former NASCAR Busch Series driver and owner Ricky Hendrick.

== 2006 ==
- January 2 – A Cessna 206 filled with skydivers crashed into a dam near Ipswich, southwest of Brisbane, Queensland, Australia.
- March 13 – Television personality Peter Tomarken and his second wife Kathleen are killed when Tomarken's Beechcraft Bonanza A36, N16JR, crashed a few hundred feet off shore in Santa Monica Bay after attempting climb-out from the Santa Monica Airport in California.
- September 11 – A Cessna A152 – G-BHAC crashed near Bethesda, Gwynedd, Wales minutes after takeoff resulting in the death of the passenger Mr. S. Kingsbury (73) and serious injury to the pilot Mr. P. Vaux (61). The AAIB attributed the cause of the crash to the pilot who shortly before had aborted a flight on an alternative return route due to bad weather! The official report is:
- October 11 – A Cirrus SR20 flown by New York Yankees pitcher Cory Lidle and an instructor crashed into the Belaire Apartments in New York City. The cause of the crash was determined as pilot error.
- December 10 – A Bell 412SP air ambulance helicopter crashed near Cajon Pass, killing the three member crew.

== 2007 ==
- March 5 – An Aérospatiale AS 332C1 Super Puma collided mid-air with a smaller Diamond DV20 Katana near Zell am See Airport in Austria. All 8 people on board the two aircraft were killed.
- July 27 – Two TV news AS-350 AStar helicopters collided in mid-air over Phoenix, Arizona, killing all four aboard.
- November 16 – Inclement weather caused a BHP Billiton AS350-B2 helicopter, to crash in Angola, killing the helicopter's five passengers.

== 2008 ==
- March 30 – A privately registered Cessna 501 Citation carrying five people crashed into two homes in Farnborough, London, after taking off from London Biggin Hill Airport. On board were former racing drivers Richard Lloyd and David Leslie. All five onboard died.
- May 2 – A chartered South Sudan Air Connection Beechcraft 1900 carrying 2 crew and 19 passengers, including South Sudan defense minister Dominic Dim Deng, crashed near Rumbek, Sudan while en route from Wau to Juba. There were no survivors.
- May 30 – A chartered 12-seater Pilatus PC-6 crashed in central Spain after shedding a wing, killing the pilot and a passenger. Other skydivers escaped.
- September 19 – A Learjet 60 crashed near West Columbia, South Carolina. Travis Barker and DJ AM survived while four others died.
- November 4 – A Learjet 45 carrying Mexican Interior Secretary Juan Camilo Mourino and 8 others plunged into a central Mexico City neighborhood, killing all on board and 7 on the ground.

== 2009 ==
- 4 January – A Sikorsky S-76 helicopter crashed into a marshy area near Bayou Penchant, Louisiana. The helicopter operated by Petroleum Helicopters was flying oil workers to a Shell Petroleum Oil Platform in the Gulf of Mexico from Gibson, Louisiana resulting in 8 fatalities and 1 passenger rescued by a United States Coast Guard helicopter.
- February 15 – A Bell 205 helicopter while flying in dense mist and light rain crashed into Polhuín Hill, Chanco, Cauquenes Province, Chile. The accident occurred when the Bell helicopter owned by Flight Services Helicópteros was ferrying local fire-fighters from a Eucalyptus plantation to a forest fire in the Quirihue Sector of the Eighth Region. The wreckage from the accident was scattered over a large area killing the pilot, a former Chilean Air Force officer, and 12 fire-fighters from the Celulosa Arauco y Constitución (CELCO) company.
- February 18 – A Eurocopter EC225 Super Puma helicopter (G-REDU) flying from the heliport at Aberdeen Airport to a BP Eastern Trough Area Project Oil Platform located 120 nautical miles (195 km) east of Aberdeen, Scotland was forced to ditch into the North Sea 500m short of its destination. A major maritime rescue operation for the ditched Super Puma owned by Bond Offshore Helicopters was coordinated by the Maritime and Coastguard Agency at the Aberdeen HM Coastguard Rescue Centre involving a Royal Air Force Sea King helicopter from No. 202 Squadron RAF Lossiemouth and a Hawker Siddeley Nimrod from RAF Kinloss. Three of the passengers were rescued by one of a pair of Bond Helicopters involved in the rescue and the remaining 15 passengers successfully rescued by an oil-rig support vessel. A further Super Puma owned by Bond Helicopters is involved in a second North Sea ditching on 1 April 2009.
- 12 March – A Sikorsky S-92 helicopter (C-GZCH) flying from St. John's International Airport, Newfoundland and Labrador, Canada to the offshore SeaRose FPSO in the White Rose oil field was forced to ditch in the North Atlantic Ocean, 30 nautical miles (56 km) east-southeast of Newfoundland. The Sikorsky S-92 owned by Cougar Helicopters issued a mayday after experiencing low oil pressure in the main gear-box and requesting emergency clearance to return to St. John's airport. The aircraft ditched in the North Atlantic approximately 10 minutes after issuing the mayday at 7:58 am ET resulting in 17 fatalities and 1 passenger rescued from the crash site.
- March 22 – A Pilatus PC-12 flying into Bert Mooney Airport outside Butte, Montana from Oroville, California crashed 500 feet (150 m) short of the runway, around 15:27 local time (21:27 GMT), killing fourteen people.
- April 1 – A Eurocopter AS332 Super Puma (G-REDL) flying from the BP Miller Oil Platform located 168 nautical miles (270 km) north-east from Aberdeen, Scotland to the heliport at Aberdeen Airport crashes into the North Sea 11 nautical miles (20 km) east of Peterhead, Aberdeenshire. The Super Puma helicopter owned by Bond Offshore Helicopters made a brief mayday call at 12:54 pm BST and was then seen to crash 2 nautical miles (3.7 km) from a supply vessel resulting in the death of 2 crew and 14 passengers. The cause of the accident was the catastrophic failure of the main rotor gearbox, which caused the main rotor to detach and severed the pylon and tail boom.

== 2010 ==
- February 18 - the 2010 Austin suicide attack, in which a Piper Dakota was intentionally flown into the side of a building housing a local IRS office. The pilot and an IRS manager were killed, 2 people were critically injured, and another 13 were also injured.

== 2013 ==
- January 4 – A Britten-Norman BN-2A-27 Islander operated by Transaereo 5074, went missing during a flight from Los Roques Airport to Caracas Airport, Venezuela, and was found 23 days later, having crashed. The plane took off about midmorning Friday, in decent conditions. Among the passengers was Vittorio Missoni, the CEO of Missoni, along with three other Italian employees, all of whom died.
- January 16 – An Agusta AW109 helicopter crashed in Vauxhall, London, after colliding with the jib of a construction crane attached to St George Wharf Tower. Two people died in the incident: the pilot, Captain Pete Barnes; 50, and a pedestrian, Matthew Wood, 39, from Sutton in South London. Five people were taken to hospital and seven more were treated at the scene. In March 2013, BBC London report indicated that the crash could have been prevented, based on a study written to which "19 experts contributed, from organisations including National Air Traffic Services (NATS), the MoD, the Metropolitan Police Air Support Unit and the British Helicopter Advisory Board". A number of safety issues had been raised by the study — particularly relating to visibility, meteorology and flying in a crowded and complex urban environment — but the CAA had not yet made any changes to the air rules. However, the studies and commentary were claimed to be productive.
- February 26 – A hot air balloon crashed near Luxor, Egypt. The crash results in 19 deaths out of 21 passengers. It was the deadliest ballooning disaster in history, surpassing the 1989 Alice Springs hot air balloon crash in Australia.
- June 29 - An in-air collision between a glider and a Cessna 150 killed four people and a dog near Whistler, B.C.

== 2014 ==
- March 13 – An AgustaWestland AW139 helicopter of Haughey Air crashed shortly after take-off from Gillingham, Norfolk, United Kingdom killing all on board.
- May 27 – A Super King Air 200 crashed in the Río de la Plata, near Carmelo, Uruguay, killing 5 and wounding 4.
- July 23 – An American pilot attempting to fly around the world in 30 days to promote education crashed with his plane in the Pacific Ocean, killing him and leaving his father, also on board, missing.
- December 8 – An Embraer Phenom 100 light jet with tail number N100EQ crashed into a suburban home in Gaithersburg, Maryland while on approach to runway at Montgomery County Airpark. All three on board and three people on the ground died in the crash.

== 2015 ==
- July 7 – A Cessna 150M and a General Dynamics F-16CJ Fighting Falcon collided over Moncks Corner, South Carolina. Both occupants of the Cessna were killed and the pilot of the F-16 ejected safely.

== 2016 ==
- January 3 – A Beechcraft King Air crashed in Paraty, Brazil, killing the 2 occupants.
- March 29 – A Mitsubishi MU-2B-60 crashed on approach to Îles-de-la-Madeleine Airport, killing all seven people aboard, including former Canadian politician Jean Lapierre, his family, and the two pilots. An initial survivor died of a heart attack after being pulled from the wreckage.

== 2017 ==
- September 8 – A Schweizer 269C helicopter crashed in Medford, New Jersey, United States after an uncontrolled descent, killing popular American country music performer Troy Gentry and the pilot.

== 2018 ==
- January 17 – A Bell UH-1H Iroquois helicopter crashed near Raton, New Mexico, United States, killing five of the six people on board.
- March 11 – A Bombardier Challenger 604, crashed en route from Sharjah International Airport to Istanbul Atatürk Airport in the Zagros Mountains in Iran, killing all eleven passengers including Turkish socialite, Mina Basaran and her seven friends returning from a bachelorette party.
- December 29 – A United Arab Emirates EMS AgustaWestland AW139 on a mission to lift an injured person clipped the world's longest zip line and crashed in Jebel Jais, Ras Al Khaimah, United Arab Emirates, killing all four crew members.

== 2019 ==
- January 21 – A Piper PA-46 Malibu light aircraft transporting footballer Emiliano Sala crashed off Alderney in the Channel Islands. The aircraft had been travelling from Nantes, France, to Cardiff, Wales. The wreckage of the aircraft was found thirteen days later. Sala's remains were recovered on 7 February.
- April 22 – The sole Northrop N-9MB was destroyed shortly after takeoff when it crashed into a prison yard in Norco, California, killing the pilot.
- July 14 – A Gippsland GA8 Airvan was reported to have suffered structural failure of a wing in flight and crashed on Storlandskär, Sweden, killing all nine people on board. The aircraft type was consequently grounded in Australia and the European Union.
- September 15 – A single-seater Aero Ultra-Light plane piloted by Mike Stefanik crashed in Sterling, CT, killing him.
- October 2 – A Boeing B-17 Flying Fortress had engine problems during a fundraising flight and crashed during a precautionary landing at Bradley International Airport, Connecticut, killing seven and injuring six on board, injuring a bystander on the ground, and destroying the historic aircraft. The Collings Foundation, its operator, was subsequently barred from carrying passengers on fundraising flights after serious safety violations were uncovered during the accident investigation.

== 2020 ==
- January 26 – A Sikorsky S-76 helicopter carrying retired basketball player Kobe Bryant, along with his 13-year-old daughter Gianna Maria "Gigi" Bryant, crashed outside of Calabasas, California, killing all nine on board.
- March 3 - A Cessna 172 carrying two wildlife biologists, who were conducting a survey of eagle's nests, and a pilot, crashed near Lincoln. IL, killing all on board.
- July 31 – A Piper PA-12 and a de Havilland Canada DHC-2 Beaver collided in mid-air over the Kenai Peninsula, Alaska, killing PA-12 pilot and Alaska State Representative Gary Knopp and all six persons aboard the DHC-2.

== 2021 ==
- May 29 – A Cessna Citation I/SP carrying actor Joe Lara, author, dietician and church founder Gwen Shamblin Lara, and five others crashed into Percy Priest Lake in Tennessee, killing everyone on board.
- November 5 - A Beechcraft King Air crashed on approach to the Caratinga Airport, near Caratinga, Minas Gerais, Brazil, killing all 3 passengers and 2 crew members on board. Among the victims was Brazilian singer Marília Mendonça.
- November 24 – American snowboarder and YouTuber Trevor Jacob parachuted out of a Taylorcraft BL-65, which then crashed unoccupied in Los Padres National Forest in California; Jacob suffered minor injuries from the parachute landing. Jacob later posted a video of the event on YouTube, provoking controversy among members of the aviation community who believed that the crash was staged. The FAA revoked Jacob's pilot certificate in 2022 after determining that he crashed the aircraft for the sole purpose of filming it. Jacob pleaded guilty in 2023 to a federal felony charge of destroying the aircraft wreckage without authorization while lying to federal investigators about its disposition.

== 2022 ==
- April 2 - A Piper PA-28R carrying two pilots was lost in the English Channel during a flight from the UK to Le Touquet in France. The pilots became disoriented when flying into a cloud. Despite searching, neither plane or pilots has been found.
- September 4 - A Cessna 551 Citation business jet crashed into the Baltic sea after widely diverting from its course to Cologne, Germany after taking off in Jerez, Spain.

== 2023 ==
- February 6 – a Boeing 737-300 conducting aerial firefighting operations crashed in Fitzgerald River National Park, Western Australia. The two pilots, who were the only aircraft occupants, escaped with minor injuries.
- June 4 – a Cessna 560 Citation V descended and crashed in an unpopulated area near George Washington National Forest, Virginia, killing its three passengers and pilot after the pilot ceased responding to radio calls and the aircraft inexplicably changed course. The flight entered the Washington, D.C., Special Flight Rules Area unauthorized and was intercepted by F-16 fighter jets, which caused a sonic boom over Washington, D.C.; the F-16 pilots found the Citation pilot slumped over and unresponsive.
- August 17 – a Beechcraft 390 Premier I crashed in an intersection of Guthrie Corridor Expressway near Elmina township in Sungai Buloh, Selangor, Malaysia. The aircraft was traveling from Langkawi International Airport to Sultan Abdul Aziz Shah Airport, where the plane crashed two minutes prior to landing. All six passengers (one of the known passengers is Johari Harun, a Malaysian politician who served as Member of the Pahang State Executive Council) and two people on the ground, including a nearby motorcyclist and a motorist, were killed.
- August 23 - An Embraer Legacy 600 crashed in Russia, killing Wagner Group leaders Yevgeny Prigozhin and Dmitry Utkin as well as 8 other passengers.

== 2025 ==
- January 31st - A Learjet 55 operating a Medevac flight crashed in Castor Gardens, Philadelphia, killing all 6 people aboard and 2 more on the ground. As of 6/12/2026 the NTSB investigation is ongoing.

== 2026 ==
- January 25 – A private Bombardier Challenger 650, registered as N10KJ, crashed shortly after takeoff in Bangor, Maine, killing all 6 occupants.
- January 28 – a Learjet 45XR operated by VSR Aviation crashed during a charter flight from Chhatrapati Shivaji Maharaj International Airport in Mumbai to Baramati Airport killing the Deputy Chief Minister of Maharashtra, Ajit Pawar and all four other occupants.
- February 3 - a Cirrus SR20, registered as G-GXVV (British registered aircraft), departed the XLR Executive Jet Centre and took off from Birmingham International airport (IATA: BHX). It crashed in Littleborough, Greater Manchester, near the M62 motorway, killing two people: pilot Arian Abbasi and passenger Mustafa Qays Obadey. The aircraft was owned by Daedalus Aviation (Services) Ltd. As of March 6, 2026, the accident is marked as "under investigation" by the Air Accidents Investigation Branch (UK).

== Notes ==
Note A: General aviation operating rules are U.S. Federal Aviation Regulations 14 CFR Part 91 or the international equivalent.
