= Ottavio Missoni =

Founder of Missoni

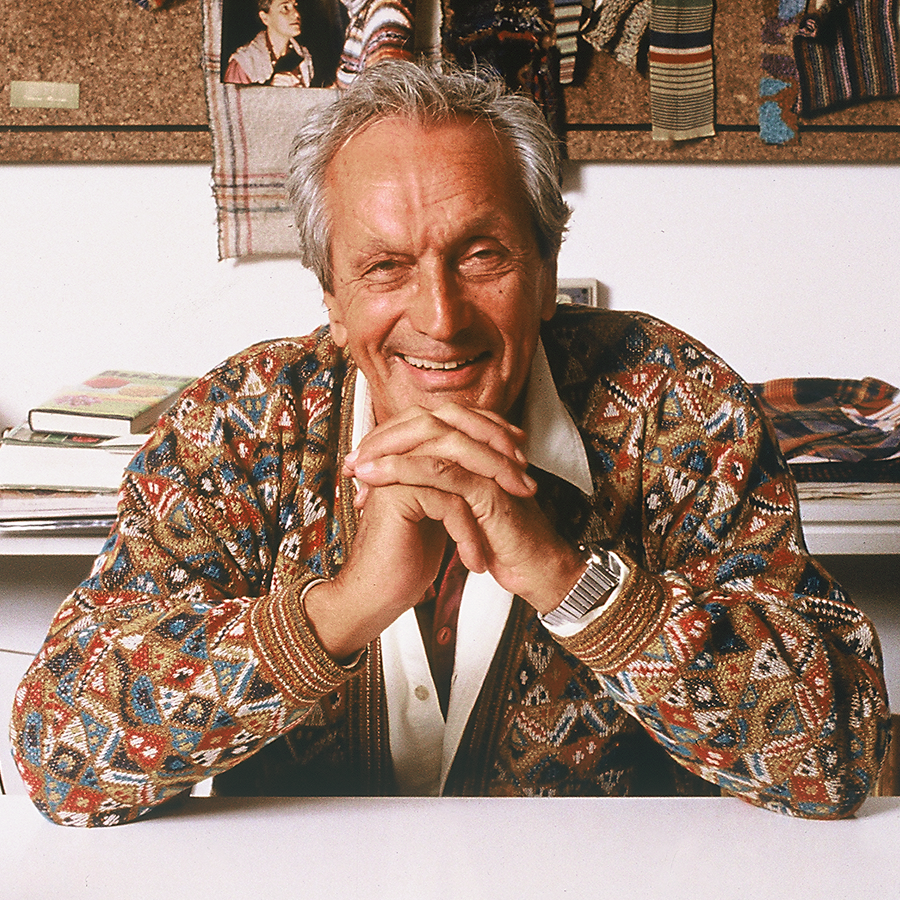
- Missoni in 1990

Personal information
- Nationality: Italian
- Born: 11 February 1921 Dubrovnik, Kingdom of Serbs, Croats and Slovenes
- Died: 9 May 2013 (aged 92) Sumirago, Italy
- Height: 1.86 m (6 ft 1 in)
- Weight: 80 kg (176 lb)

Sport
- Country: Italy
- Sport: Athletics
- Event: 400 metres hurdles
- Club: Gallaratese

Achievements and titles
- Personal bests: 400 m: 47.8 (1939); 400 mH: 53.1 (1948)

Count Ottavio Missoni (11 February 1921 – 9 May 2013) was an Italian businessman, clothing and resortwear designer, founder of the Italian fashion house Missoni and an Olympic hurdler who competed in the 1948 Summer Olympics. Along with his wife Rosita, he was part of the group of designers who launched Italian ready-to-wear in the 1950s, thereby ensuring the global success of Italian fashion.

== Early life ==
Ottavio Missoni was born in Dubrovnik, Croatia, on the Dalmatian coast. His mother, Teresa de' Vidovich di Capocesto e Rogoznica, was a Dalmatian Countess while his father, Vittorio Missoni, was a Friulian sea captain who moved to Dalmatia while it was under Austrian rule. Through his mother he was a close cousin of Italian politician Renzo de' Vidovich. He was educated in Zadar, Trieste, and Milan.

== Sporting achievements ==
Missoni joined the Italian National Track Team in 1937 at age 16. He won the individual national championship four times. He also competed with the Italian team in the 1948 Summer Olympics. At the age of 88 he was still practising sports such as shot put and javelin throw.

Year	Competition	Venue	Position	Event	Performance	Note
1939	Italian Athletics Championships		1st	400 metres		
1941	Italian Athletics Championships		1st	400 metres hurdles		
1947	Italian Athletics Championships		1st	400 metres hurdles		
1948	Italian Athletics Championships		1st	400 metres hurdles		
1948	Olympic Games	(United Kingdom) London	6th	400 metres hurdles	54.0	
1948	Olympic Games	(United Kingdom) London	Final	4x400 metres	DNF	

== War service ==
Missoni served as an infantryman during World War II. In 1942, he fought in the Battle of El Alamein, where he was captured by the Desert Rats and served out the remainder of the War in an English prisoner-of-war camp.

== Marriage ==
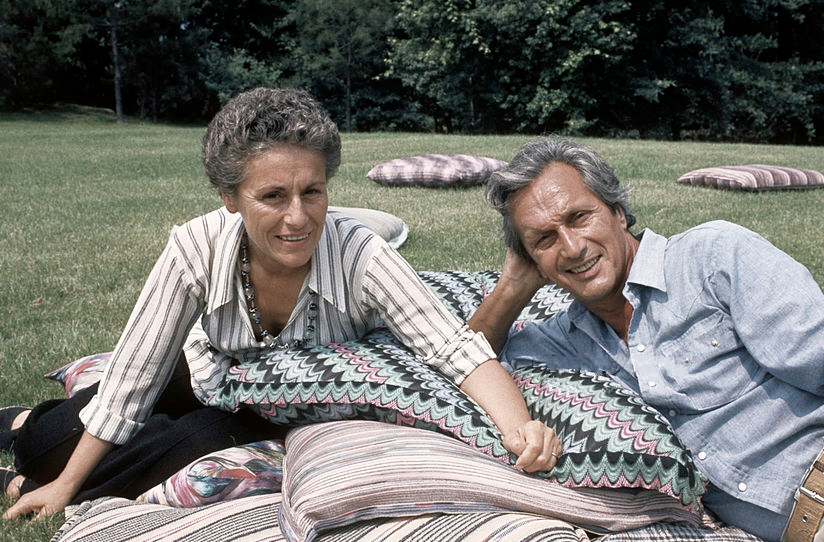
Rosita Jelmini and Ottavio Missoni in 1975

While in London for the Olympics, Missoni met the 16-year-old Rosita Jelmini, an English student from Golasecca, Italy. She was in the audience at Wembley at the time he was running in the finals. They married five years later on 18 April 1953. Their first son, Vittorio, was born on 25 April 1954. Luca, their second son, was born on 4 July 1956. Their only daughter, Angela was born in 1960.

== Fashion ==
After the war, Ottavio and his team-mate Giorgio Oberweger launched an activewear business in Trieste making wool tracksuits, which they called Venjulia suits. The tracksuits used details such as English ribbing and drop-stitching, and featured zippered legs, a detail which Missoni has been credited with inventing. The success of the Venjulia suits, which took into account the need of athletes for functional, warm garments enabling freedom of movement, led to their being worn by the Italian Olympic team in 1948.

In 1953, following his marriage to Rosita (whose family ran a shawl-making business), the Missonis set up Maglificio Jolly, a machine-knitwear workshop in Gallarate. The Missoni's experimentations with machine-knitting led to the discovery that clothing-weight fabrics made using machines originally designed for shawls and bedspreads could be surprisingly lightweight. They supplied designs to the department stores Biki and later, La Rinascente in Milan, where in 1958, the first Missoni-labelled garments, a line of colourful vertically striped shirtdresses, were displayed in the window. Ottavio's experience as an activewear designer and manufacturer was applied to his and Rosita's designs, which contributed significantly to the development of Italian sportswear as a challenge to the American industry.

In 1965, Anna Piaggi covered Missoni in an article for Arianna, a magazine published by Mondadori. She continued to actively promote Missoni through her long career as a fashion journalist, including writing their press releases whilst at Vogue Italia in the 1980s. This helped bring Missoni to the attention of the wider world, as did a joint collection with Emmanuelle Khanh in 1965.

They held their first catwalk show in 1966, and the following year, presented a show at the Palazzo Pitti in Florence. This show proved controversial due to the unplanned transparency of the models' clothing under the lights, revealing a lack of underwear and leading to comparisons to the Crazy Horse cabaret. Although the see-through look was presented by Yves Saint Laurent the following year, the Missonis were not invited back to Florence. However, the scandal gave them immense publicity, and helped lead to the development of Milan as a fashion capital when the press followed the Missonis back to Milan. The Missonis went on to feature in many leading fashion publications, including Women's Wear Daily, Vogue, Marie Claire, Elle, and Harper's Bazaar, and were championed by influential editors such as Diana Vreeland and Piaggi.

In 1970, Missoni opened their first in-store boutique at Bloomingdale's in New York, and their first directly owned boutique in Milan in 1976.

Ottavio was the colourist and pattern designer whose watercolour paintings and gouaches formed the basis of Missoni textiles, whilst his wife developed the cuts and shapes of their garments. Ottavio's designs, which combined multi-coloured zigzag, stripe, check and wave patterns in unexpected colour combinations, were highly influential, and were recognised as having artistic merit. In 1975, an exhibition of Ottavio's textiles and related paintings, curated by Renato Cardazzo, was held in Venice, and Ferruccio Landi wrote an article titled "Missoni, a Work of Art, Pullover Size". In 1974, Jennifer Hocking of Harper's Bazaar and Queen selected male and female ensembles by Missoni as the Dress of the Year for the Fashion Museum, Bath. In 1976 Ottavio was named one of the ten most elegant men in the world, sharing the list with Robert Redford and Charles, Prince of Wales.

To mark the 25th anniversary of Missoni's founding, a retrospective was held in 1978 at the Rotonda della Besana in Milan, and later hosted by the Whitney Museum of American Art in New York, the first time the Whitney had hosted a fashion exhibition.

In 1983, Ottavio and Rosita designed their first stage costumes for a production of Lucia di Lammermoor, starring Luciano Pavarotti, at the La Scala opera house in Milan.

In 1991 an exhibition in Yūrakuchō, Tokyo, was held of Ottavio's tapestries, the first time they had been displayed in Japan.

== Awards ==
- Neiman Marcus Fashion Award (1973)
- Tommy Award from the American Printed Fabric Council Inc. (1976)
- Gold Medal for Civic Merit from the Municipality of Milan (1979)
- Fragrance Foundation Award for Best Packaging (1982)
- Civiltà Veneta and Knight Commander of the Order of Merit of the Italian Republic (1986)
- Munich Mode-Woche Award, from the mayor of Munich (1992)
- Knight of the Order of Labour Merit of the Italian Republic (1993)
- Honorary Royal Designers for Industry (HonRDI) by the Royal Society of Arts, London (1997)
- Honorary Doctorate from Central Saint Martins College of Art and Design, London (May 1999)
- Honorary Doctorate Degree of Humane Letters from the Academy of Art College, San Francisco (1999)
- Premio Leonardo Qualità Italia (2002)
- Honorary degree from Shanghai University (2002)
- Lombardia per il Lavoro, from the Lombard Regional Government (2004)
- Honorary citizen of Trieste (2007)

== Later life and death ==
In 1997 Ottavio and Rosita passed the Missoni business to their children. Vittorio acted as marketing director, Angela became creative director, and Luca holds a technical role, having created designs for the Aeros dance troupe and an installation for the Expo 2005. Since the handover, Missoni has expanded into a lifestyle brand which includes furniture, car interiors, a chain of hotels, and collaborations with companies such as Target.

In 2003, when Missoni marked their 50th year of business, Suzy Menkes wrote a tribute in the International Herald Tribune stating how the "best-beloved" Missonis represented "one big happy local family of hands-on wizards".

On 4 January 2013, Missoni's eldest son, CEO Vittorio Missoni, his wife Maurizia, two other passengers and two crew disappeared in an airplane near the Los Roques islands near Venezuela. The body of his son Vittorio will never be found, but only the remains of Vittorio Missoni's wife and the bodies of the two pilots will be identified.

On 1 May 2013, twelve days after marking his and Rosita's 60th wedding anniversary, Ottavio was taken to hospital, but at his request, he went home to be with his family in Sumirago, where during the night of 8 and 9 May, the 92-year-old Ottavio died "serenely".

== See also ==
- List of Italian records in masters athletics
- 2013 Transaereo 5074 Britten-Norman Islander crash
