= Bolivar Airport (disambiguation) =

Bolivar Airport may refer to:

- Bolivar Airport, serving Bolivar, Argentina (ICAO: SAZI)
- Bolivar Municipal Airport, serving Bolivar, Missouri, United States (FAA: M17)
- Puerto Bolívar Airport, serving Uribia, Colombia (ICAO: SKPB)
- William L. Whitehurst Field, an airport serving Bolivar, Tennessee, United States (FAA: M08)

== See also ==
- Simón Bolívar International Airport (disambiguation)
