= Alfa Castaldi =

Italian photographer (1926–1995)

Alfa Castaldi (19 December 1926 – 17 December 1995) was an Italian photographer.

== Career ==
He began his photographic career in 1954, depicting the social life of his native Milan for Italian magazines, moving into fashion photography in the 1960s, when he provided images for Novità (which became Vogue Italia in 1966), Linea Italiana, and Arianna (magazine)|Arianna. Castaldi married Anna Piaggi in New York in 1962. By 1969, he was one of the major contributors to Vogue Italia. At the end of the 1960s, opening a studio in Milan, he expanded into advertising, creating campaigns for the likes of Giorgio Armani, Laura Biagiotti, Fendi, Gianfranco Ferré, Karl Lagerfield and Ottavio and Rosita Missoni. His magazine coverage also expanded, with his work appearing in L'Uomo Vogue, Vanity, Vogue Bambini, Vogue Sposa, and, outside the Condé Nast Publications, Amica, Panorama and L'Espresso.

== Biography ==
In the time of the 1950s, Castaldi served as a reporter, and he was in close relation to Ugo Mulas. Together they joined with other artists of various forms and lived what was recorded to be a bohemian lifestyle. Although Castaldi studied under an art critic while he was in college, the career of being a critic was not what he wanted to do because it didn't appeal to him. He became interested in reporter photography and editorials. That is when he began his photography interest and became a freelancer with the major magazines of his time.

He frequented since 1954 the legendary Bar Jamaica, an artists' hangout in the Brera district, from where the major exponents of Italian contemporary art transited, and where he met Ugo Mulas, Mario Dondero and Carlo Bavagnoli, with whom he established a close bond, including a professional one. He began collaborating with newspapers and magazines such as L'Illustrazione Italiana and Settimo Giorno, documenting the rebirth of Italian cultural life, new forms of pictorial expression, writers, and journalism. Until 1959, he worked on reportages on cultural and film personalities; he made trips to southern Italy, photographed French colonisation in Algeria and anti-nuclear demonstrations in London, architecture in Paris and northern France. He also occasionally published in other magazines such as Le Ore and Oggi.

In 1958, the fundamental meeting of his life took place: that with Anna Piaggi, a fashion journalist destined to become one of the creators of the "made in Italy" myth. It was she, who was already collaborating with Vogue, including Arianna and Vogue Italia, who introduced Castaldi to the world of fashion. A strong partnership was created between them that would last until Castaldi's death. In 1962, they were married in New York.

In 1969, Castaldi became a regular contributor to the Condé Nast publishing group and did fashion shoots for Vogue (L'Uomo Vogue, Vogue Bambini, and Vogue Sposa), but he did not abandon his constant vocation for photographic research. He also worked in the emerging field of advertising, while his topical images continued to appear in numerous magazines. Experimentation also resulted in collages and various mixed-media works, juxtaposing photographs with objects and fabrics from the world of high fashion. In the early 1970s, Castaldi carried out research on the ethnographic origins of men's clothing through a series of photographs that would be published several times in Vogue Uomo.

Castaldi never took care of the preservation of his photographs and negatives, so that the archive that exists today, the result of the collection work of his heirs, preserves only a small part of his work: a good part of his unpublished images have been irretrievably lost.

== Education ==
Castaldi studied and received his education in the History of the Arts at the University of Florence. There, he was able to study with the Italian art critic who was known as Roberto Longhi. It is recorded that Castaldi actually became one of Longhi's favourite students.

== Family ==
Castaldi was married to Anna Piaggi. They met when he started to work with her on fashion stories. They were together until his death. He met her in the year of 1958. They married four years after they met.

== Death ==
Castaldi died in 1995, in Milan, Italy.
