= Margherita Missoni =

Italian fashion designer, model, socialite and heiress

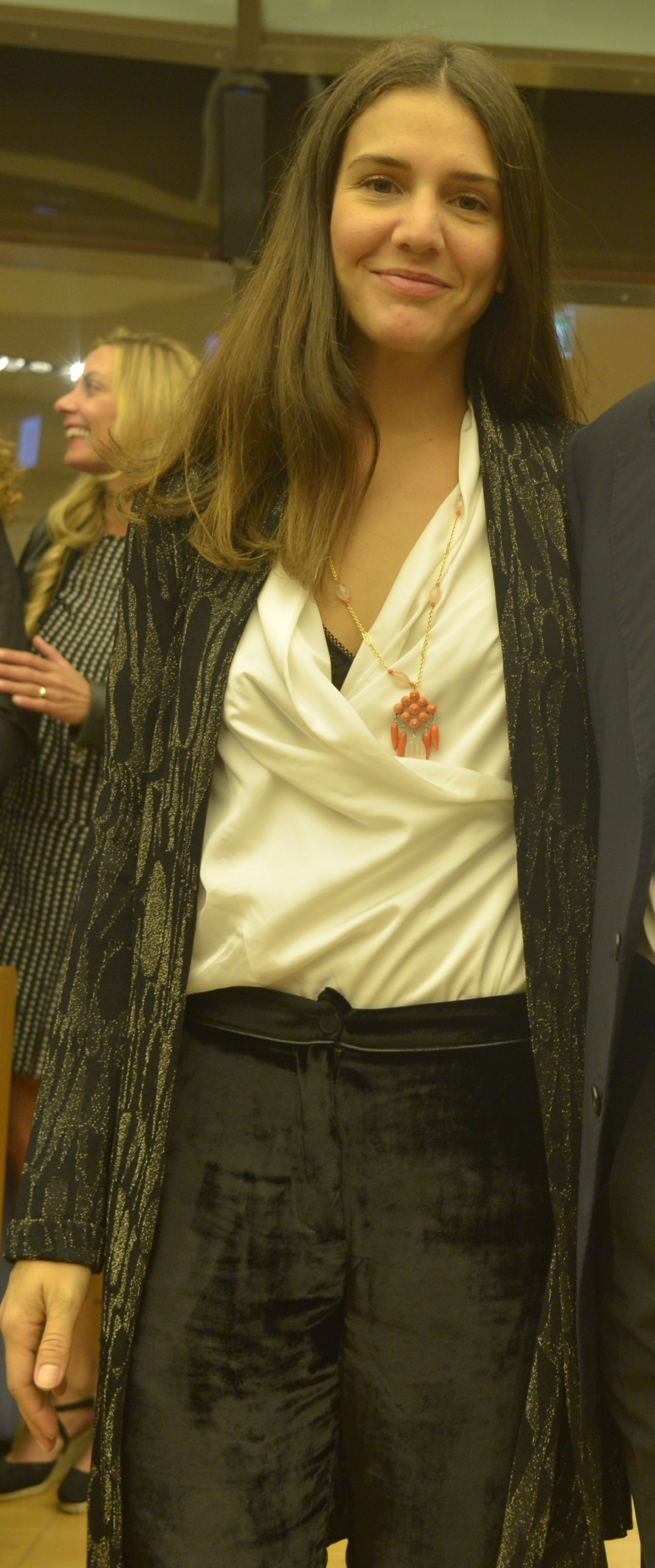
- Missoni in 2014.
- Born: Margherita Maccapani Missoni; February 22, 1983 (age 43); Italy
- Education: Columbia University
- Occupations: Fashion designer; model; heiress; actress
- Spouse: Eugenio Amos (m. 2012; sep. 2022)
- Children: 2
- Website: http://www.missoni.com

Margherita Maccapani Missoni Amos (born February 22, 1983) is an Italian fashion designer, model, socialite and heiress to her family's Missoni fashion house, which was founded by her grandparents Ottavio Missoni and Rosita Missoni Jelmini. Missoni currently lives in Montonate, a suburb of Mornago (Italy) close to the Missoni headquarters, where she is following her design career.

== Biography ==
Margherita Maccapani Missoni was born in Italy and grew up in the Italian countryside, spending weekends in Milan. She studied philosophy at Columbia University.

Margherita has studied philosophy both at the Università Statale di Milano and at the Columbia University in New York where, following that period, she also attended the Stella Adler acting school and the Lee Strasberg Theatre Institute. However, after she moved to New York, she struggled emotionally when her academic credits could not transfer to the United States educational system. Following this obstacle, Missoni chose to explore her first love, theatre.

== Career ==
Before she was featured in Missoni campaigns, she was a company ambassador, a duty entailing promotion at fashion related events. In her own words, Missoni described becoming the face of a Missoni campaign as "a natural evolution".

At the age of 20, she was already considered by Harper's & Queen magazine as one of the world's 100 most beautiful women.

In 2006, she appeared in Jean Genet's The Maids, based on a true story of two maids who kill their mistress.

Since the spring of 2009, Margherita started getting involved with the brand on a different level, becoming part of the design team, following the footsteps of her mother Angela, the Maison's Creative Director.

She received the America Award of the Italy-USA Foundation in 2014 for having helped the relationships between Italy and the USA.

In 2015, she launched her own independent children's line of clothes, followed by a few collaborations with other brands. In October 2018, she became creative director of the M Missoni brand.

== Personal life ==
She says her relationship with her family is close, particularly her connection with her sister and her mother.

On June 23, 2012, she married the race car driver, Eugenio Amos (b. 1985) in Brunello, Italy. The couple welcomed a son Otto Hermann Amos on September 6, 2013. Their second son Augusto was born on May 15, 2015. She separated from Amos in 2022. She's now in a relationship with Marcantonio Brandolini d'Adda.

== See also ==
- Missoni Fashion
