= Rosita Missoni =

Italian fashion designer (1931–2025)

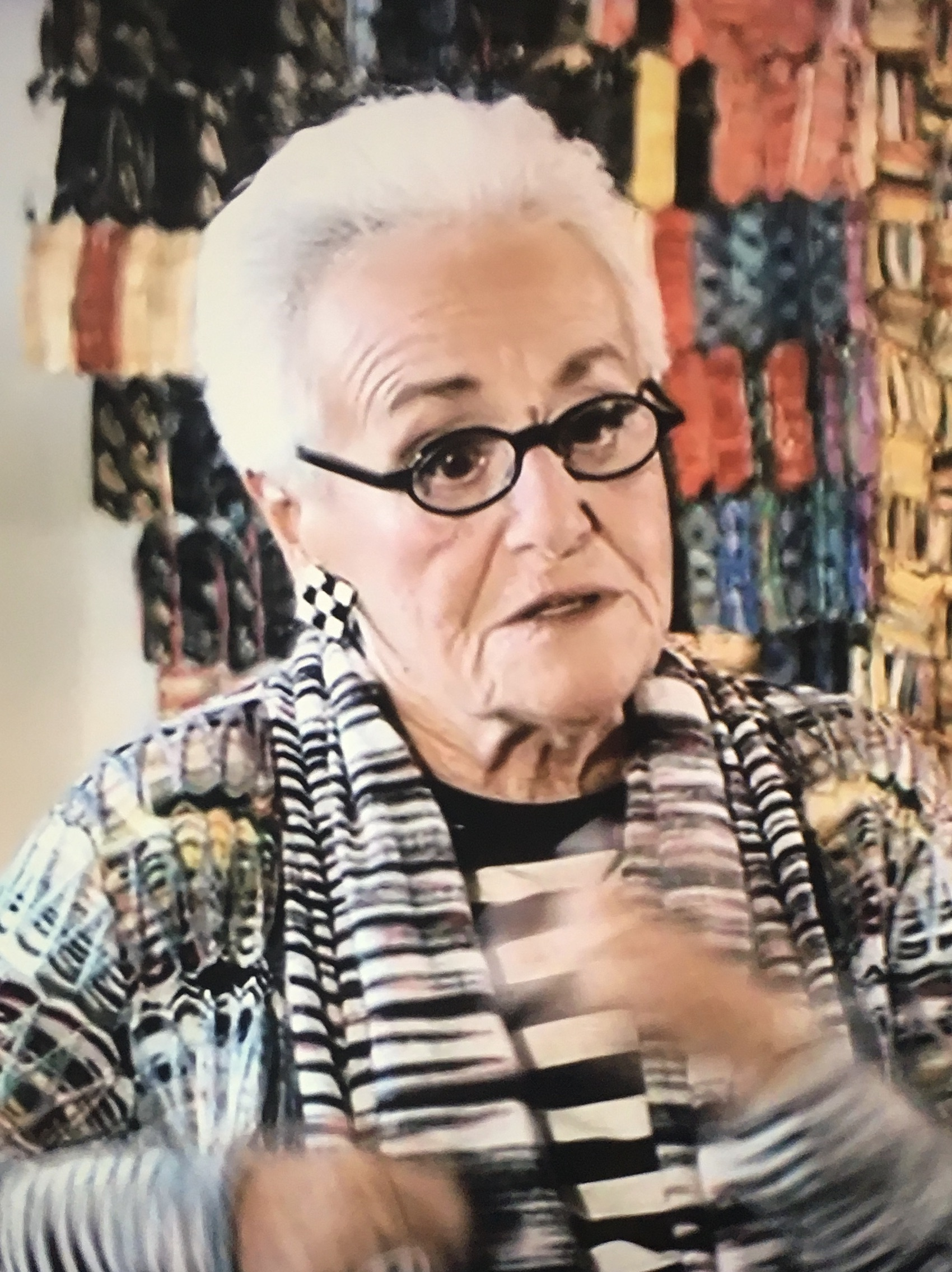
- Rosita in 2019
- Born: Rosita Jelmini; 20 November 1931; Golasecca, Italy
- Died: 1 January 2025 (aged 93); Sumirago, Italy
- Occupations: Creative director; Fashion designer; Luxury businesswoman
- Board member of: Missoni
- Spouse: Ottavio Missoni (m. 1953; died 2013)
- Children: 3, including Vittorio
- Website: www.missoni.com

Rosita Missoni (née Jelmini; 20 November 1931 – 1 January 2025) was an Italian knitwear designer. She and her husband Ottavio Missoni co-founded Italian luxury fashion house Missoni.

== Early life ==
Rosita Jelmini was born in Golasecca, northern Italy, on 20 November 1931. She came from a family of textile artisans based in the Milan region specializing in the manufacture of shawls

== Career ==
Rosita met Ottavio Missoni in 1948, when he was participating in the London Olympics, and they married in 1953.

In 1953, Rosita and Ottavio started a small knitwear store in Gallarate, which would go on to become the fashion house Missoni. They later moved to Sumirago where they built a factory. They were part of a group of Italian designers whose ready-to-wear clothing became popular globally in the 1950s and 1960s. The brand became famous for its colorful knitted garments with zigzag patterns, made on "Raschel" machines like those used by Rosita Missoni's family for making shawls. Rosita Missoni cites Sonia Delaunay as one of her inspirations.

From 1997, the couple's children, Angela, Luca, and Vittorio Missoni, took over management of the fashion house, sharing the creative and financial aspects, while Rosita Missoni developed Missoni Home and dedicated herself to interior design by reusing old patterns.

== Personal life and death ==
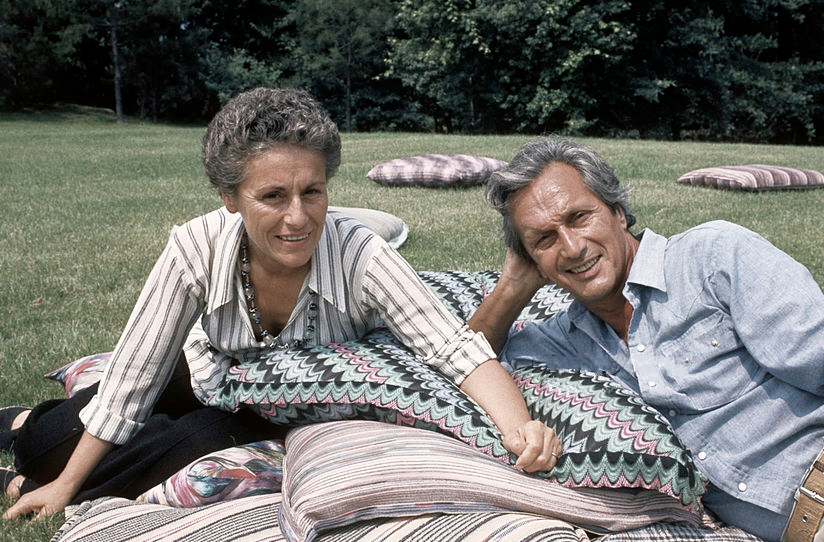
Rosita Jelmini and Ottavio Missoni in 1975

Rosita and Ottavio had three children, all of whom became involved with the Missoni business; their son, Vittorio Missoni, was CEO until his death in a plane crash in 2013. Ottavio Missoni died later that year.

Rosita Missoni continued to live in a house in Sumirago since 1970, which she decorated colourfully and exuberantly, with numerous flea market treasures. She regularly received journalists there.

Rosita died from complications of pneumonia at her home in Sumirago, on 1 January 2025, at the age of 93.
