= 2013 Transaereo 5074 Britten-Norman Islander crash =

Aviation accident in Venezuela

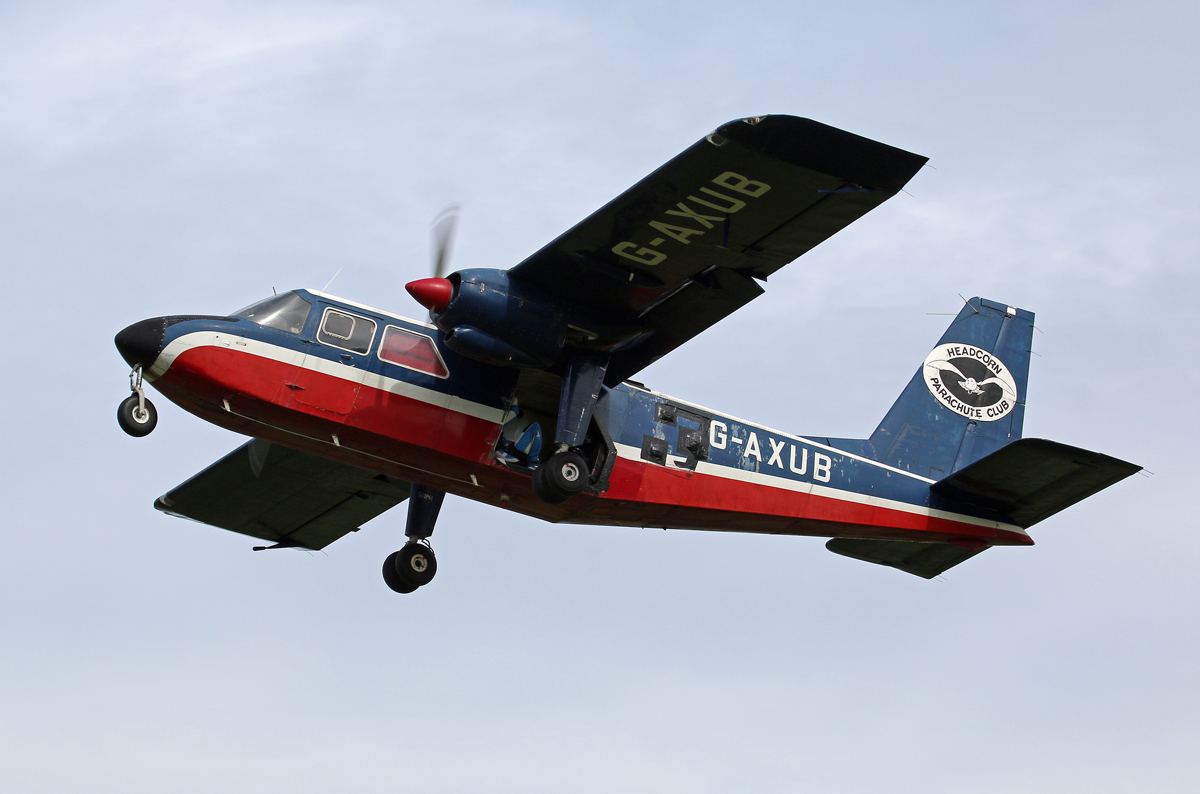
- A Britten-Norman BN-2A Islander similar to the one involved in the crash

Accident
- Date: 4 January 2013
- Summary: Under investigation
- Site: Caribbean Sea between Los Roques and Caracas

Aircraft
- Aircraft type: Britten-Norman BN-2A-27 Islander
- Operator: Transaereo 5074
- Registration: YV2615
- Flight origin: Los Roques Airport, Venezuela
- Destination: Caracas Airport, Venezuela
- Occupants: 6
- Passengers: 4
- Crew: 2
- Fatalities: 6
- Survivors: 0

On 4 January 2013, a Britten-Norman Islander light passenger aircraft operated by Transaereo 5074 crashed during a domestic flight from Los Roques Airport, on the Los Roques archipelago, to Caracas, Venezuela, killing all six people on board. The accident took place exactly five years after another airplane accident in the same airport area. Among the victims was Italian fashion entrepreneur Vittorio Missoni.

== Discovery of the wreckage ==
On 27 June 2013, the Deep Sea oceanographic ship confirmed that the missing aircraft had been found in the Caribbean, north of the Los Roques archipelago. The plane was 76 meters deep and broken in several places, about 15 miles from Gran Roque.

In October 2013, the bodies and remains of 3 people were found. And subsequently only a year later in 2014 the identities were confirmed, on the basis of the analyzes carried out on the biological finds found during the first underwater searches carried out in the week of 15 October 2013 and those found during the recovery of part of the wreck which took place on 25 November 2013 off the coast of Los Roques.

On 3 September 2014, according to what was communicated by the Attorney General of Venezuela, Luisa Ortega Diaz, other remains of the plane were found: the engine and a large part of the fuselage.

The searches for the plane were coordinated by the Italian-Venezuelan entrepreneur Hugo Marino, owner of the Sea Corporation, a company specializing in searches and recoveries, which disappeared in 2019. Hugo Marino was last seen on 20 April 2019, after landing at Simon Bolivar Airport in Caracas, Venezuela.

== Victims ==
The group of four passengers had arrived in the Caribbean Sea on 28 December 2012 and had moved to Los Roques by the end of the year. The journey to Caracas should have marked the end of the holiday: the four friends would in fact have left for Italy on a night flight on 5 January 2013.

The victims were Italian fashion entrepreneur Vittorio Missoni and his wife or partner Maurizia Castiglioni, and their friends, Guido Foresti and Elda Scalvenzi who were on holiday in Los Roques Archipelago. Finally the two crew members, who will be the only bodies to be recovered. The bodies of all passengers were never recovered, although newspapers initially mistakenly confirmed that all the bodies had been found.

The two crew members were recognized as the Venezuelan pilots, Hernan Jose Marchan and Juan Carlos Ferrer Milano. Subsequently, the remains of his Missoni's wife, Maurizia Castiglioni, were also confirmed. Remains that will be delivered to the family and buried in the Busto Arsizio cemetery, alongside the father.

== Investigation ==
The last contact with the control tower of Caracas Airport dates back to 12.39 on 4 January 2013. During the course of the investigation, it emerged that the pilot had an expired medical certificate and the airline had not yet received the authorization to operate. In a statement from Asdrubal Bermudez, president and owner of the company Transaereo 5074, even though the airline was unable to fly, the plane involved in the incident had met all safety certifications and was allowed to fly. But this is however disputed by Italian investigators as the accident was probably due to poor maintenance done on the aircraft. Most likely the plane went into a spin and crashed violently onto the surface of the sea, breaking into several pieces and sinking.
