= 2008 Los Roques Archipelago Transaven Let L-410 crash =

2008 aviation disaster in northern Venezuela

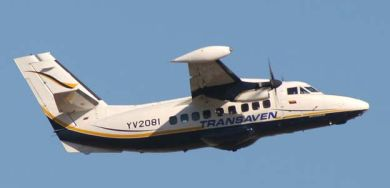
- YV2081, the aircraft involved in the accident

Accident
- Date: 4 January 2008
- Summary: Ditching following dual engine failure
- Site: Off the Venezuelan coast near the Los Roques Archipelago; 11°20′N 66°47′W

Aircraft
- Aircraft type: Let L-410 Turbolet
- Operator: Transaven
- Registration: YV2081
- Flight origin: Simón Bolívar International Airport, Venezuela
- Destination: Los Roques Airport, Venezuela
- Occupants: 14
- Passengers: 12
- Crew: 2
- Fatalities: 14
- Survivors: 0

On 4 January 2008, a scheduled domestic Transaven flight from Simón Bolívar International Airport to Los Roques Airport, 118 kilometres (64 nmi) north of the departure airport and over water, radioed that both engines had failed and that they were descending through 910 metres (3,000 ft). The crew was going to attempt a ditching as close as possible to the Los Roques archipelago. Shortly thereafter, radio contact was lost and the plane disappeared from radar.

== Aircraft ==
The aircraft operating this flight was a Let L-410UVP-E3, registration YV2081, built in Czechoslovakia in 1987.

== Search ==
Another Transaven Let L-410 flew over the area the aircraft was thought to have crashed, but found no trace, other than a spot of liquid on the surface of the water that soon after dissipated.

Active sea and air searches were called off without finding any trace of the aircraft. On 12 January 2008, some fishermen found the body of a man 12 kilometres off the coast of Venezuela. After having performed the autopsy, the doctors determined that it was the corpse of the co-pilot, the 37-year-old Osmel Alfredo Avila Otamendi. At a short distance from the place of discovery of the corpse of the co-pilot his life vest was found.

In April 2008, a Venezuelan navy vessel, using a sonar, was able to identify the presumed wreckage of an aircraft, located approximately 300 metres deep. The wreckage was recovered, but it didn't belong to the disappeared aircraft. Subsequently, the search was suspended.

=== Discovery of the wreckage ===
On 20 June 2013, more than five years after the accident, the wreckage of the aircraft was located in the sea at a depth of 970 metres (3,180 ft), nine kilometres south of Los Roques. It was discovered by the US flagship Sea Scout which was working in the area for days. The ship was looking for the wreckage of another crashed aircraft which went down five years to the day of this incident.

By late 2017, over nine years after the accident and four years after the discovery of the wreckage, despite offers of assistance from Italy and a previous pledge by authorities to salvage the wreck, no efforts had yet been made in this regard, amid a sociopolitical and economic crisis in Venezuela.

== Passengers and crew ==
The crew consisted of one Venezuelan pilot and a copilot.

The Italian passengers were:

- a family from Treviso: Paolo Durante, 40 years, his wife Bruna Guerrieri and their daughters Sofia and Emma, six and eight years old respectively;
- Annalisa Montanari, 42 years, and Rita Calanni Rindina, 46 years, from Bologna;
- Stefano Frangione and Fabiola Napoli, on their honeymoon from Rome.

Along with them, there were four other passengers: a Swiss citizen and three Venezuelans.

Fatalities
Nationality	Passengers	Crew	Total
Italian	8	0	8
Venezuelan	3	2	5
Swiss	1	0	1
Total	12	2	14
