= Gran Roque =

Island in the archipelago of Los Roques; federal dependency of Venezuela

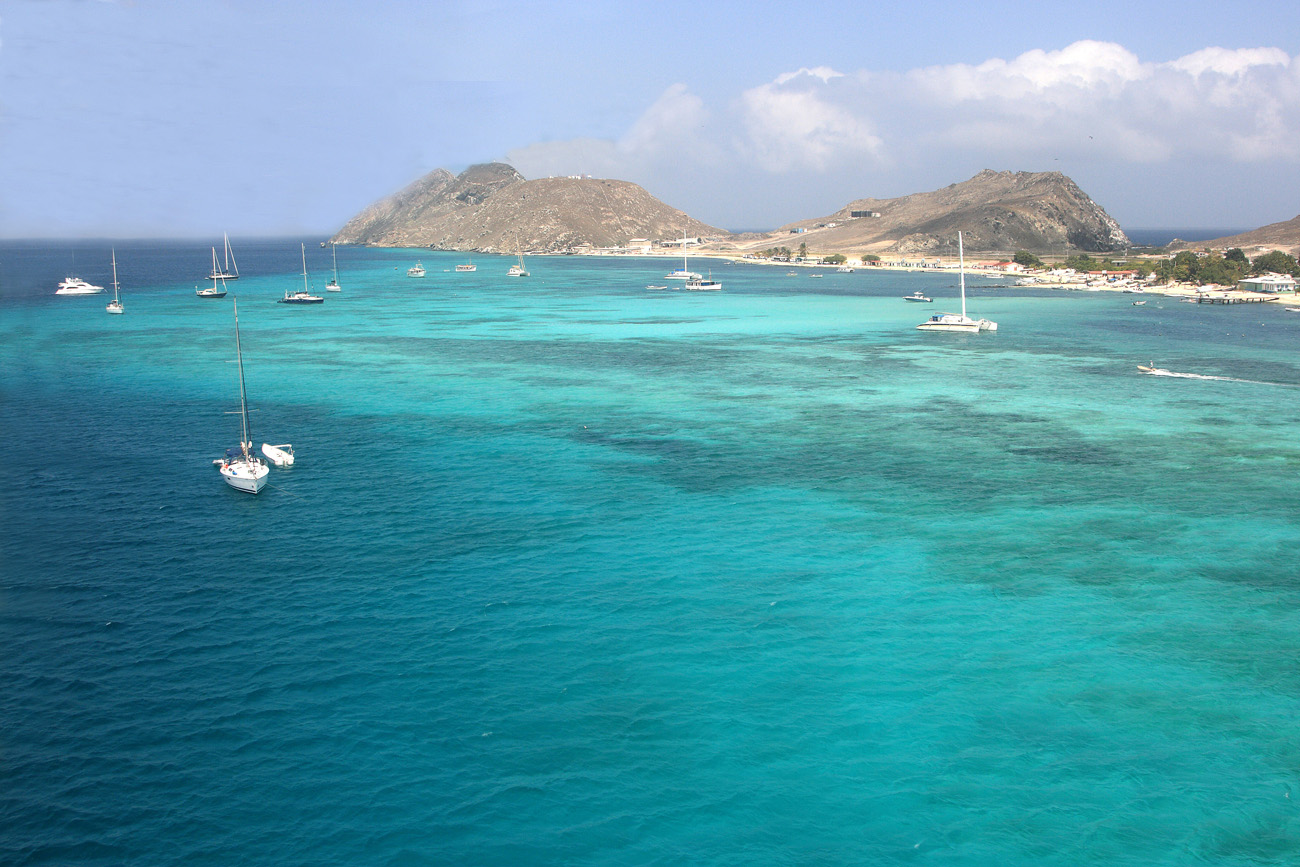
- Gran Roque Island

- Location in Venezuela

Geography
- Location: Leeward Antilles; Caribbean Sea
- Coordinates: 11°57′00″N 66°40′36″W
- Archipelago: Los Roques

Administration
- Venezuela
- Federal Entity: Federal dependencies of Venezuela

Demographics
- Population: 3.100

Gran Roque is an island, one of the federal dependencies of Venezuela, located in the southeastern Caribbean Sea in the archipelago of Los Roques, which has 1.7 km^{2} (170 ha) in extent, where the majority of the population lives. Los Roques Airport is located by the sea, a few meters from the beach.

== History ==
Gran Roque already appears in Spanish maps as part of the general captaincy of Venezuela, during the government of Antonio Guzman Blanco was included in the so-called Colón Territory. In the twentieth century is included in the Federal dependencies and in the decade of 1990 becomes the seat of the authority of Area that would disappear to be replaced by the Insular Territory Miranda in 2011. In 2019 the local airport was modernized.

== Geography ==
The area of Gran Roque is 170 hectares or 1.70 square kilometers, it is located in the northeastern part of the archipelago, being its geographic coordinates 11º 47'33" of north latitude and 66º 40'37" of west longitude in its central part. its highest point is the Cerro Roque at the altitude of 37 meter amsl and has 2.361 inhabitants. It is shaped like a right triangle with the sharpest vertex facing northwest, and its maximum dimensions are: 3.15 km in a southeast to northwest direction and 990 m in a northeast to southwest direction.

== Government ==
Gran Roque works as capital of the Venezuelan Federal Dependencies, and also of the Insular Miranda Territory and is the seat of all the inns, the airport, the school and was the headquarters of the Single Area Authority (AUA).

The island does not depend on any municipal or state government but is directly administered by the central government through the figure of the island Territory, created in 2011.

== Gallery ==
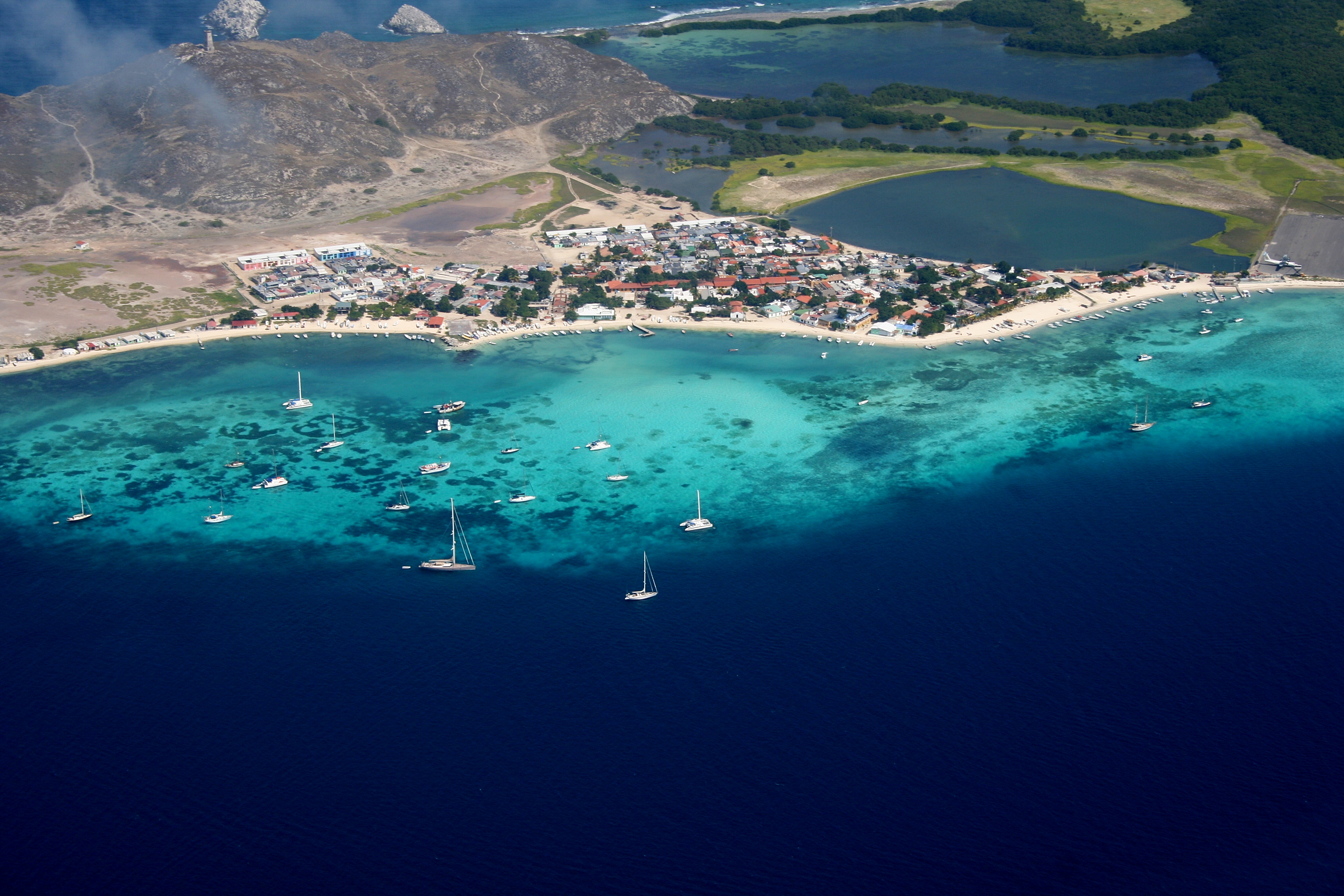

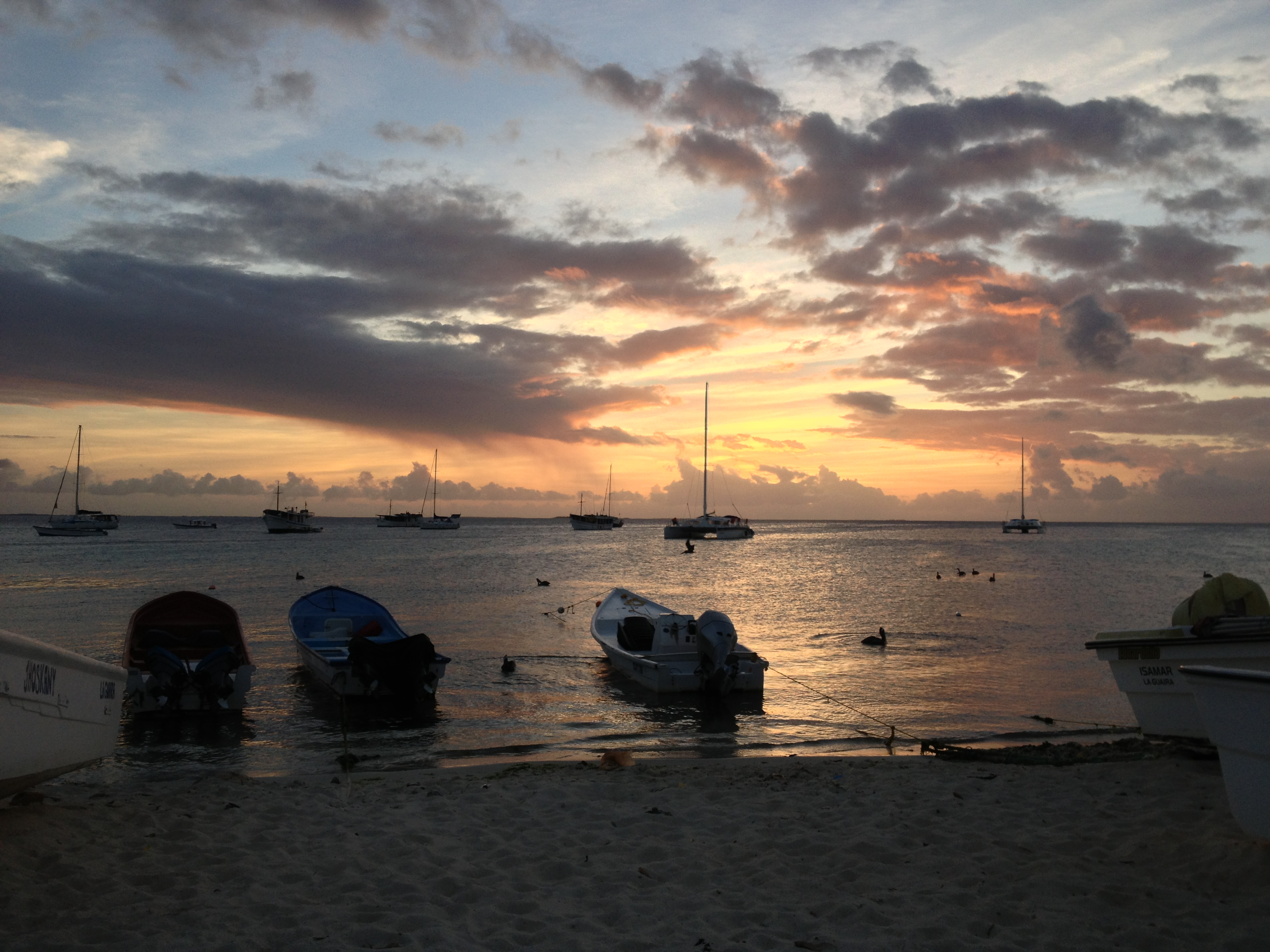

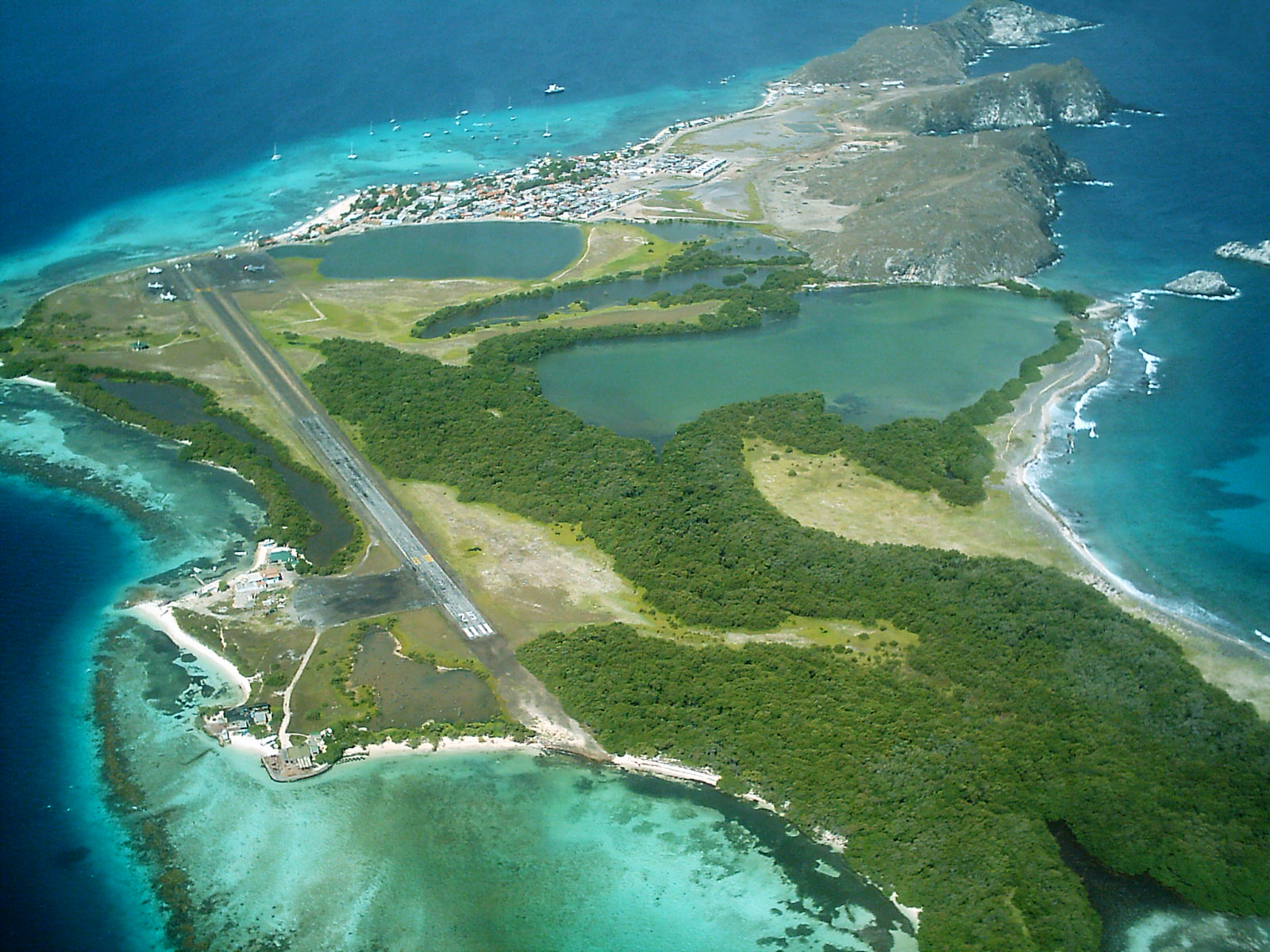

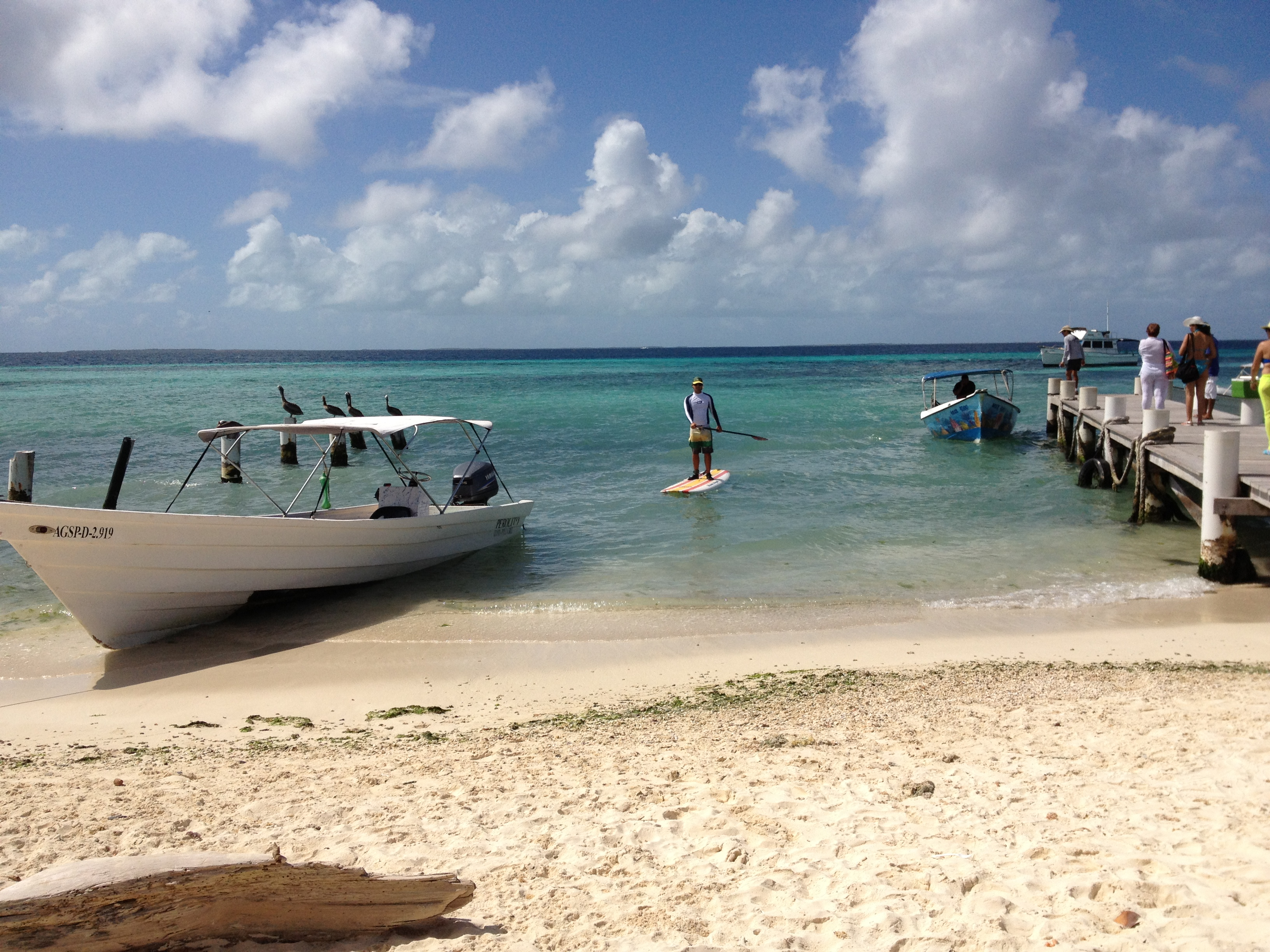

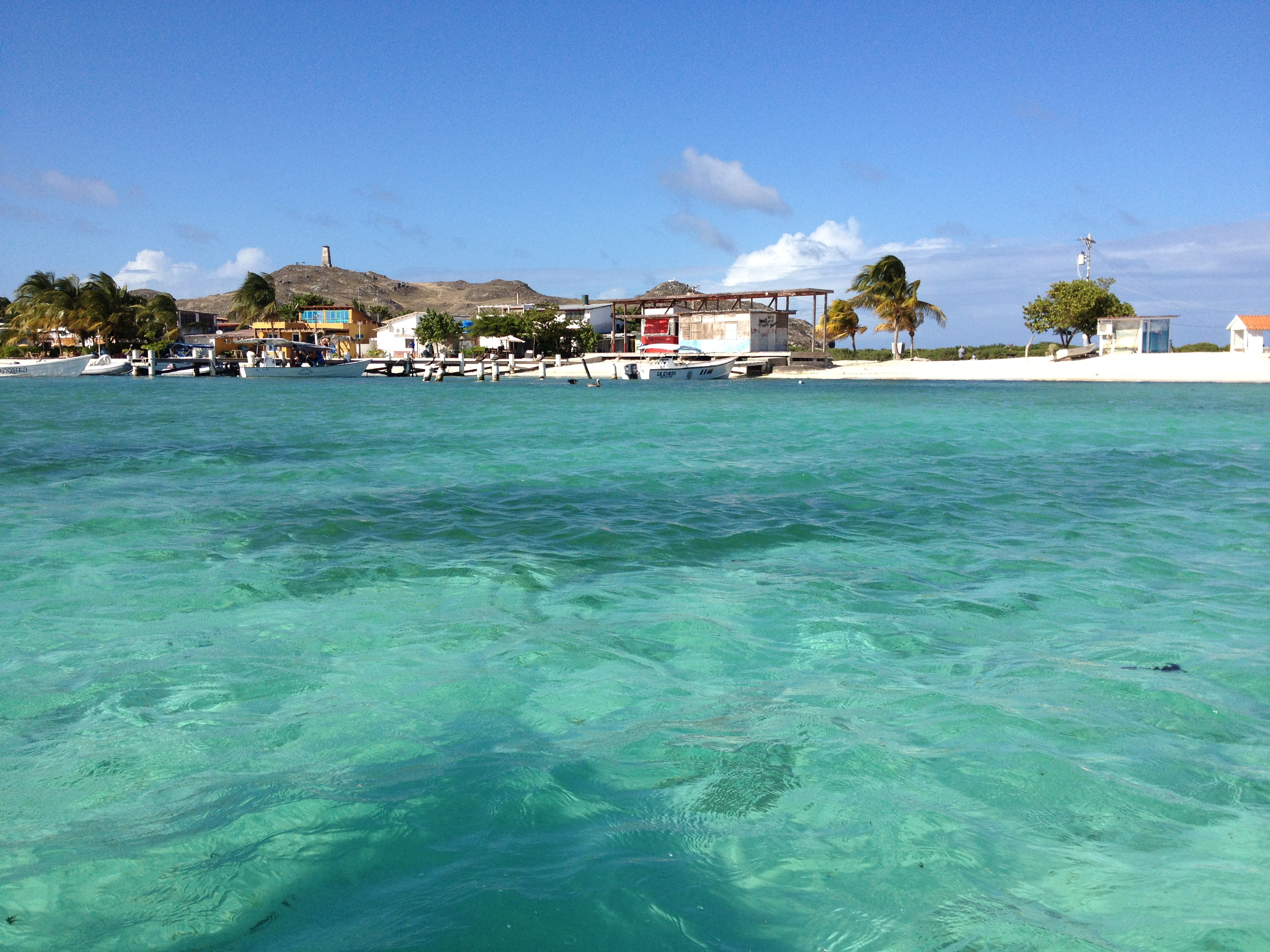

== See also ==
- Geography of Venezuela
