= Bolívar Airport =

- IATA: none; ICAO: SAZI

Summary
- Airport type: Public
- Operator: Government
- Location: Bolívar, Argentina
- Elevation AMSL: 308 ft / 94 m
- Coordinates: 36°11′11″S 061°04′34″W
- Interactive map of Bolívar Airport

Runways
Direction	Length		Surface
Direction	m	ft	Surface
02/20	1,200	3,937	Asphalt
14/32	1,124	3,689	Dirt/Grass
- Source: DAFIF

Bolívar Airport (ICAO: SAZI) is an airport serving Bolívar, a town in Bolívar Partido, Buenos Aires Province, Argentina.
