= Missoni =

Italian fashion house

- Type: Private
- Industry: Fashion
- Founded: Gallarate, Lombardy, Italy (1953)
- Founder: Rosita and Ottavio Missoni
- Headquarters: Varese, Italy
- Number of locations: 20 countries
- Area served: Worldwide
- Key people: Alberto Caliri (Creative Director); Angela Missoni; Luca Missoni; Livio Proli (CEO)
- Products: Knitwear, leather, cotton, swimwear
- Services: Fashion retail
- Revenue: $151 million (2025)
- Owner: Missoni family
- Number of employees: 300 (2018)
- Divisions: Missoni; Missoni Home; Hotel Missoni
- Website: www.missoni.com

Missoni is an Italian luxury fashion house based in Varese, and known for its colourful knitwear designs. The company was founded by Ottavio ("Tai") and Rosita Missoni in 1953.

== History ==
=== Early beginnings ===
The business was founded in 1953, when Ottavio and Rosita Missoni set up a small knitwear workshop in Gallarate, Italy. They presented their first collection under the Missoni label in Milan in 1958. The business prospered, with the support of fashion editor Anna Piaggi, then at Arianna magazine. Rosita met the French stylist Emmanuelle Khanh in New York in 1965, which led to a collaboration and a new collection the following year. In April 1967, they were invited to show at the Pitti Palace in Florence. Rosita told the models to remove their bras, supposedly because they were the wrong colour, and showed through the thin lamé blouses. The material became transparent under the lights and caused a sensation. The Missonis were not invited back the following year, but the business grew; a new factory in Sumirago was built in 1969. Missoni designs were championed in the US by Diana Vreeland, editor of American Vogue, and a Missoni boutique was opened in Bloomingdales.

Missoni reached the peak of its influence in the fashion world in the early 1970s (though has since been the subject of revivals in interest as new generations of fashion writers discovered the appeal of its core knitwear). Tai Missoni then became more interested in other projects, designing costumes for La Scala, carpets, and tapestries.

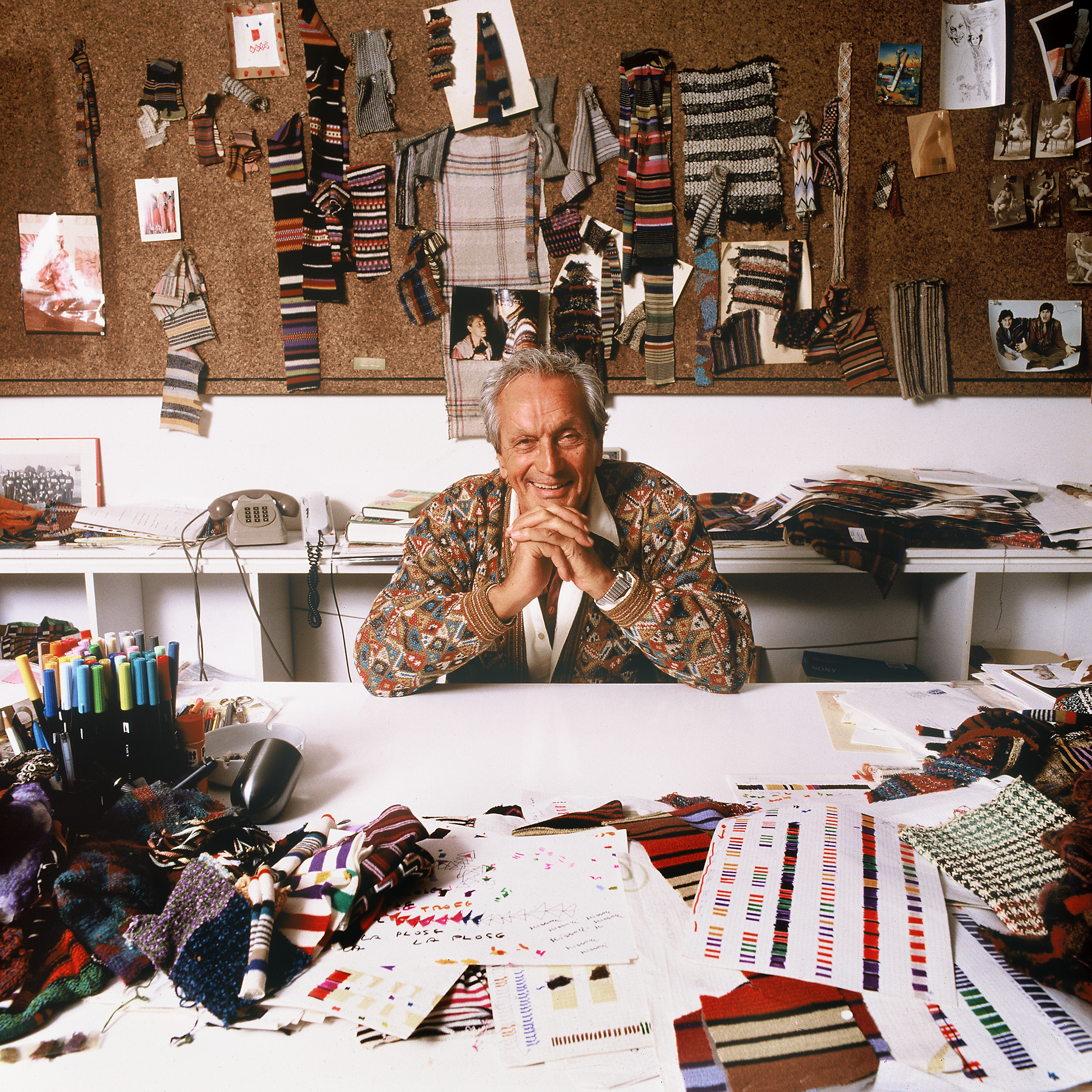
The designer Ottavio Missoni portrayed in his studio in Sumirago, at the headquarters of Missoni S.p.A. in 1990

=== Second generation ===
Rosita Missoni lost interest in fashion in the 1990s and was succeeded by her daughter Angela in 1998 while Rosita took over Missoni Home.

In 1996 the Missonis transferred control of the business to their three children: Vittorio Missoni became marketing director; Luca (born 1956) was menswear designer until 2008; Angela (born 1958) was womenswear designer, and took over menswear in 2008 when Luca became responsible for the Archive and Events. By 2005, Missoni earned 60 to 70 per cent of its revenue from womenswear. From 2007 until 2009, Massimo Gasparini briefly served as the company's CEO, setting up a new organizational structure and streamlining its product offer.

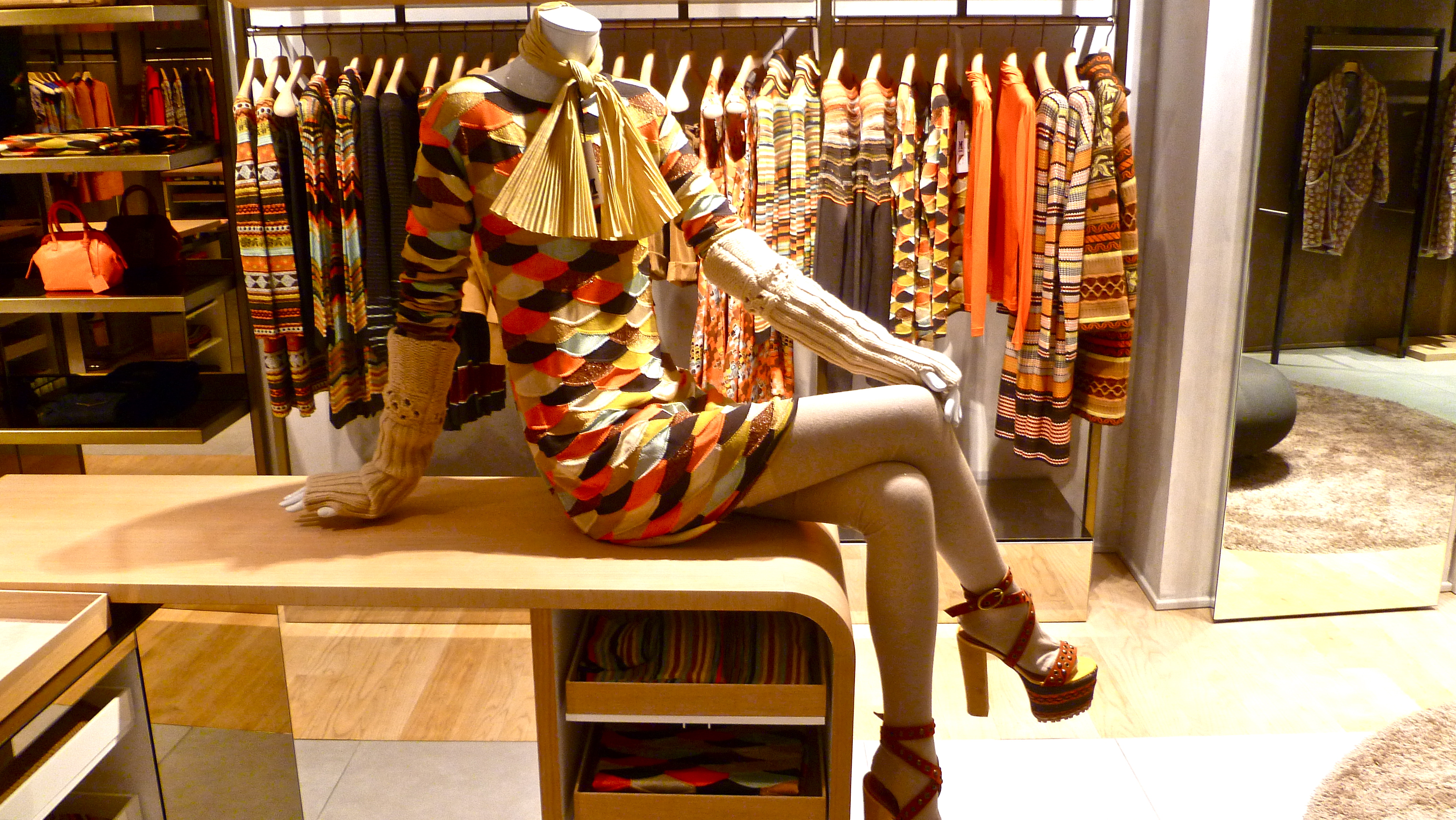
Missoni dress in Westfield shopping mall, 2010

On 13 September 2011, Missoni made headlines briefly when Target Stores offered low-cost variants of Missoni products in their stores and on their website. Most items sold out within 24 hours, there were long queues outside stores and the Target website was overloaded. Some items appeared at higher prices on eBay within hours and Target did not restock.

=== Death of Vittorio Missoni ===
On 4 January 2013 a plane carrying Vittorio Missoni, then CEO of Missoni, went missing off the coast of Venezuela. On 27 June 2013, the Venezuelan government announced that remains of the aircraft had been found north of Los Roques archipelago. Vittorio's body was recovered along with those of the other passengers.

=== Death of Ottavio Missoni ===
Ottavio Missoni died during the night between 8 and 9 May 2013, at the age of 92.

From 2013, designer Patricia Urquiola was responsible for redesigning the label's stores. In February 2014, Angela Missoni hired Rossella Jardini, former creative director of Moschino, as a consultant.

=== 2018 ===
In 2018, the Missoni family sold a 41.2% stake in the company to investment fund Fondo Strategico Italiano (FSI) for €70 million ($82 million), putting the family's share at 58.8%. A year later, Angela Missoni announced plans to list the company at the Borsa Italiana within three years.

In 2021, Angela Missoni was succeeded at the helm of the women's line by Alberto Caliri. The following year, Missoni named Filippo Grazioli its new creative director, with Caliri overeeing Missoni Sport and Missoni Home.

In October 2024, Missoni announced the departure of Grazioli and the reappointment of Alberto Caliri to the creative director position.

=== Death of Rosita Missoni ===
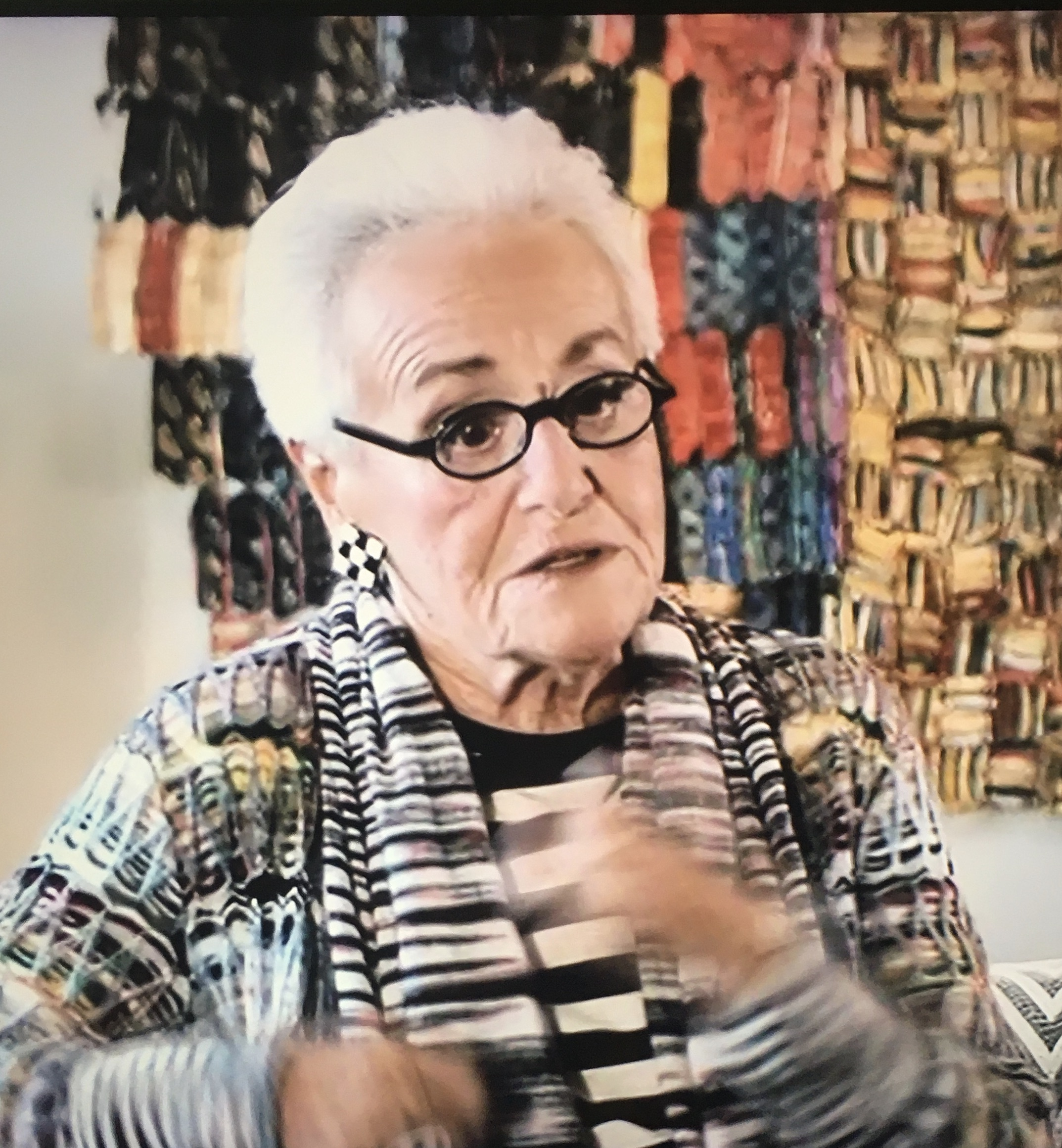
Rosita Missoni in 2019

On 2 January 2025, Rosita Missoni (née Jelmini) died at the age of 93.

== Other brands ==
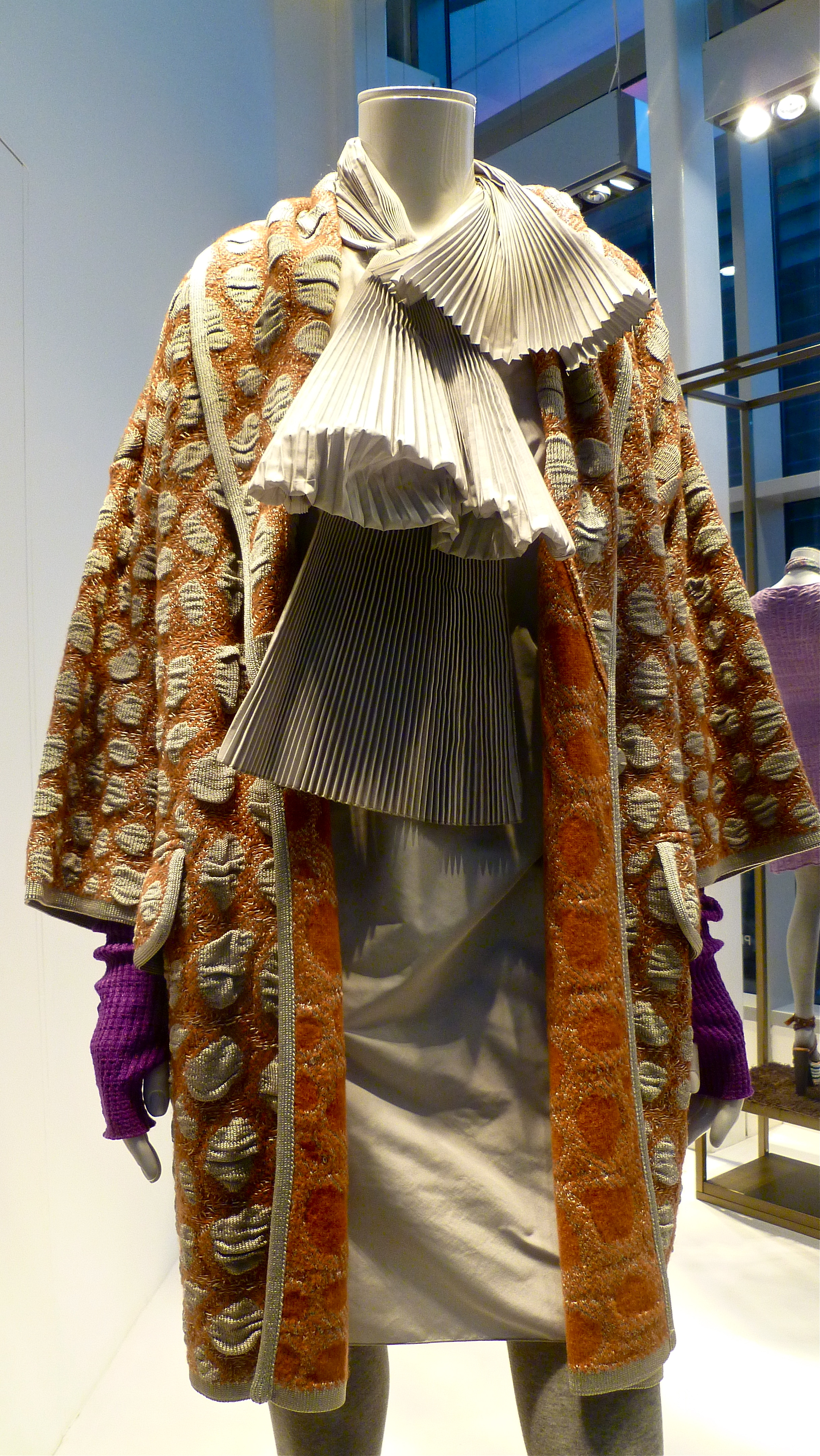
A Missoni coat and dress in 2010

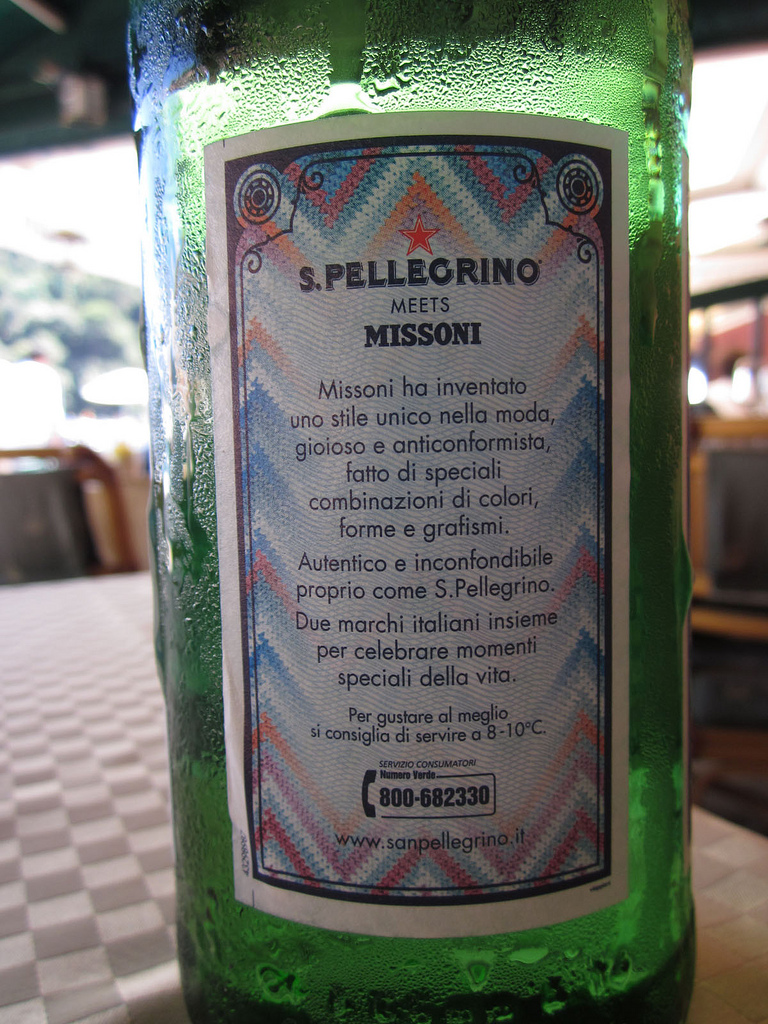
A temporary promotional design by two iconic Italian brands: a Pellegrino mineral water bottle with a Missoni-style label, 2010

=== Missoni Sport ===
Missoni Sport was first launched in 1985 under the creative direction of Luca Missoni. It was initially licensed out to Malerba, brought in-house in January 2002 and eventually discontinued in 2007.

Missoni Sport was relaunched in 2022, now produced in-house as a wellness and comfort line, retailing at around 20 per cent less than the signature brand. In 2023, it launched a capsule collection of tracksuits, cardigans, hoodies and sweatshirts in collaboration with soccer player Mike Maignan.

=== M Missoni ===
M Missoni, a less expensive line, was introduced in 1998 and initially manufactured and distributed by Marzotto. Margherita Maccapani Missoni, granddaughter of Rosita Missoni, served as the label's creative director from 1998 until 2021.

In 2012, M Missoni launched its first accessories collection. Missoni later brought the M Missoni line in-house in April 2018, selecting Italian manufacturing company Gilmar SpA as a production partner for the line. This followed the expiration of the licensing agreement with Valentino Fashion Group, which had first been signed in 2005.

By 2019, M Missoni's sales amounted to around 30 million euros. Also in 2019, Margherita Missoni presented her first full collection as the label's creative director. By 2021, M Missoni was discontinued.

=== Missoni Home ===
Missoni Home has its roots in furnishing fabrics produced in 1981 in collaboration with Rosita's family firm.

In 2012, Missoni Home launched its cooperation with the 645-unit Acqua Livingstone tower in Manila, as the first residential building in the world for the brand to fully equip.

In 2021, Missoni signed an agreement with Dar Al Arkan Real Estate Development Company to use its Missoni Home line to decorate the apartments and penthouses of the Urban Oasis, a 38-floor waterfront building under construction by the Dubai Canal. As part of Missoni Home, the company launched the Missoni Resort Club project in 2022, customizing the Le Carillon beach club in Paraggi and the One&Only Reethi Rah resort in the Maldives. By 2023, a Missoni Resort Club outpost opened in collaboration with Nikki Beach Costa Smeralda in Porto Cervo.

=== Hotel Missoni ===
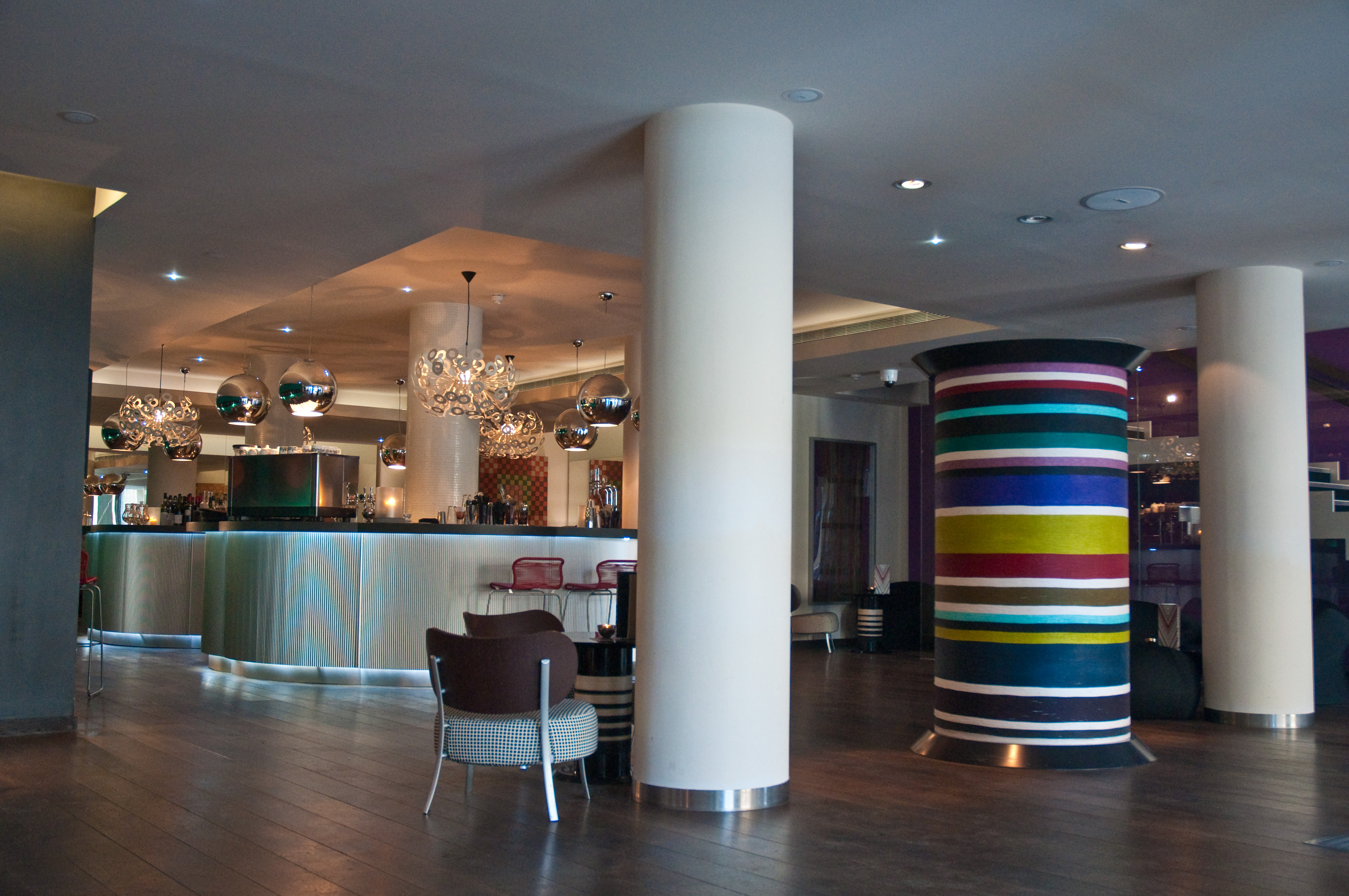
Missoni Hotel lobby, Edinburgh, September 2011

In November 2005, Missoni and the Rezidor Hotel Group signed an agreement to create Hotel Missoni, with plans to have 30 hotels open or in development by 2012. Two Hotel Missoni branches eventually opened in Edinburgh (2009) and Kuwait City (2011). The hotel agreement ceased in 2014, and the Edinburgh hotel was rebranded as Radisson Collection.

=== Missoni Kids ===
Missoni operated a licence with Children Worldwide Fashion until early 2000s, when it was brought in-house with a more restricted product offer. In 2022, Missoni signed a multiyear licensing agreement with Italian manufacturing company Simonetta for the development, production and worldwide distribution of the Missoni Kids line, starting from the spring 2023 collection.

=== Other activities ===
The company launched its first perfume – manufactured by Charles of the Ritz and developed and distributed by Max Factor – in 1982, although the license is now held by Estée Lauder.

In 2011, Target offered Missoni for Target, a limited-edition collection including home goods; accessories; and apparel for women, men, girls, and babies both in stores and online.

In 2017, Missoni Baia, Missoni's first venture into residential real estate development, broke ground in the Edgewater neighborhood of Miami, Florida. The 249 unit complex will be completed by the end of 2022.

In 2018, Missoni and Safilo entered into a five-year global licensing agreement for the production and distribution of prescription eyewear and sunglass collections for both the main label and M Missoni. In 2019, the company signed a global licensing agreement for the design, production and distribution of watches with Timex Group.

== Campaigns ==
Over the years, Missoni has commissioned various notable photographers for its ad campaigns, including Juergen Teller (2010) and Alasdair McLellan (2013).

== Sponsoring and philanthropy ==
In 2017, Jennifer Lopez teamed up with Missoni along with Women's Cancer Research Fund and Saks Fifth Avenue to set a fund raise for cancer research. Lopez helped promote the $35 limited-edition Missoni tees, and the profits went to 12 different cancer charities.
