= Los Roques Airport =

Domestic airport on El Gran Roque island, Venezuela

Los Roques Airport Aeropuerto Los Roques
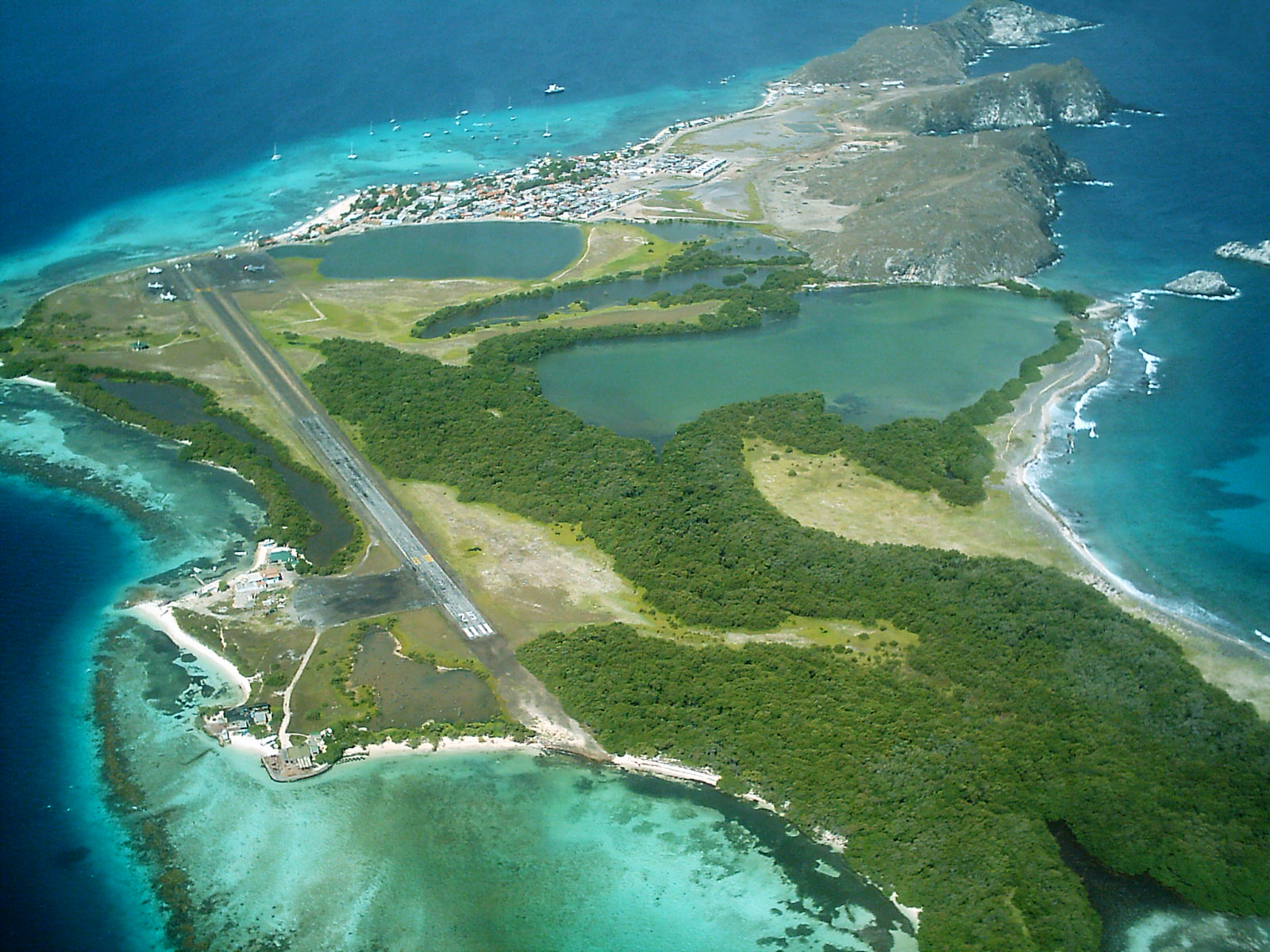
- IATA: LRV; ICAO: SVRS

Summary
- Serves: Los Roques archipelago
- Location: Gran Roque island, Venezuela
- Elevation AMSL: 10 ft / 3 m
- Coordinates: 11°56′45″N 66°40′15″W
- Interactive map of Los Roques Airport

Runways
Direction	Length		Surface
Direction	m	ft	Surface
07/25	1,300	4,265	Asphalt
- Sources: GCM

Los Roques Airport (Spanish: Aeropuerto Los Roques) (IATA: LRV, ICAO: SVRS) is a small domestic airport on the El Gran Roque island in the Los Roques archipelago off the coast of mainland Venezuela, some 130 kilometres (81 mi) north of Caracas.

The runway was extended 300 metres in 2023, by means of a controversial landfill in the eastern shore of the airport. Air traffic was controlled remotely from Simón Bolívar International Airport, but since 2023 the airport has a mobile air traffic control tower.

== Airlines and destinations ==
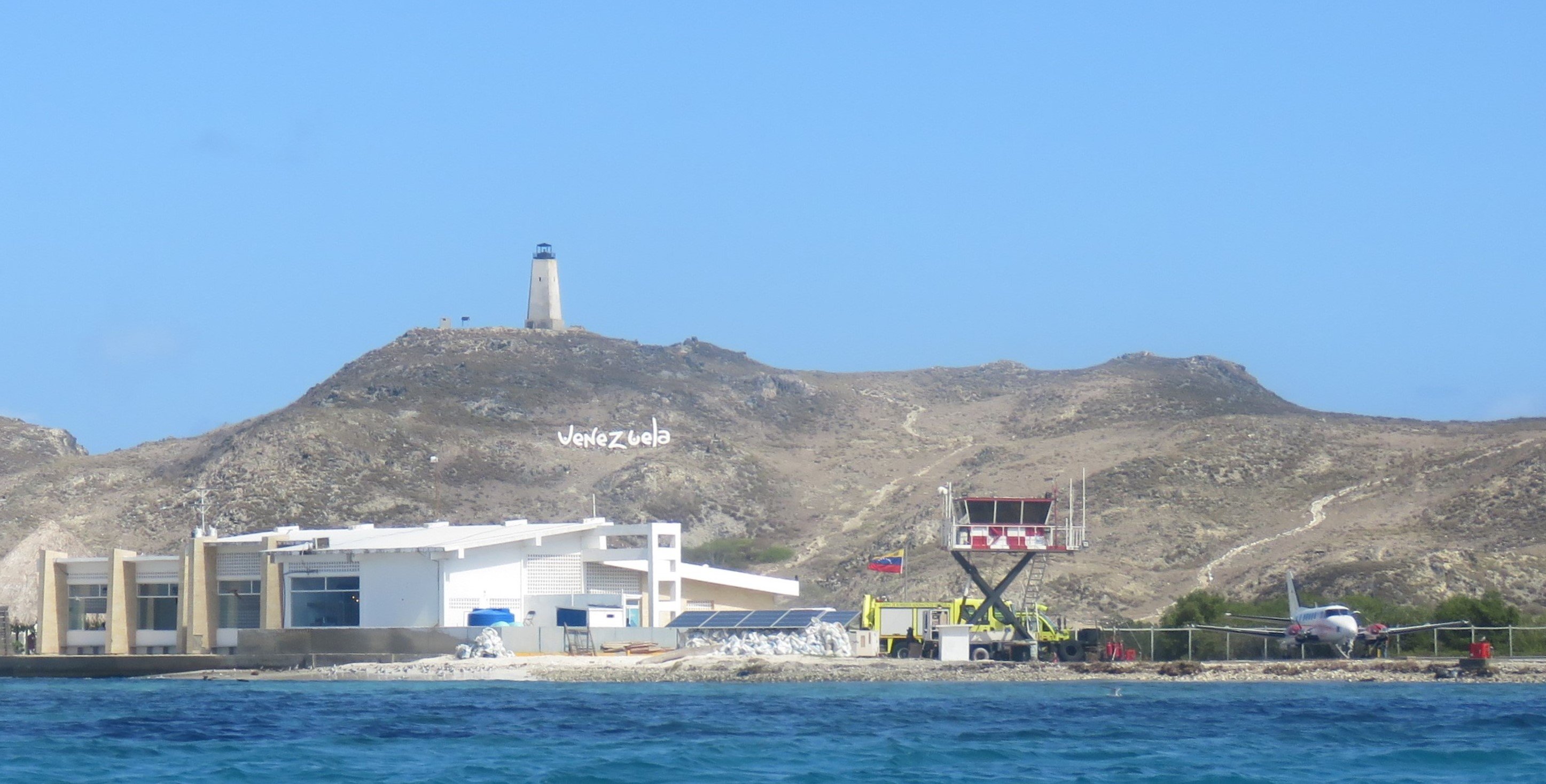
The airport in 2024

Airlines	Destinations
Conviasa	Caracas

== Accidents ==
- 4 January 2008: a Transaven Let L-410 Turbolet crashed into the ocean while on a scheduled domestic flight from Caracas, Venezuela, to Los Roques, killing all 14 on board.
- 4 January 2013: a Transaereo 5074 Britten-Norman Islander crashed into the ocean while on a domestic flight from Los Roques to Caracas, killing all 6 people on board, including Italian fashion entrepreneur Vittorio Missoni.

== See also ==
- Transport in Venezuela
- List of airports in Venezuela
