= Simón Bolívar International Airport =

Simón Bolívar International Airport may refer to:

- Simón Bolívar International Airport (Venezuela) in Maiquetía, Venezuela, near Caracas
- Simón Bolívar International Airport (Colombia) in Santa Marta, Colombia
- José Joaquín de Olmedo International Airport, formerly Simón Bolívar International Airport, in Guayaquil, Ecuador
