= Golasecca =

Golasecca Vorasecca / Gorasecca (Lombard)
- Comune
- Comune di Golasecca
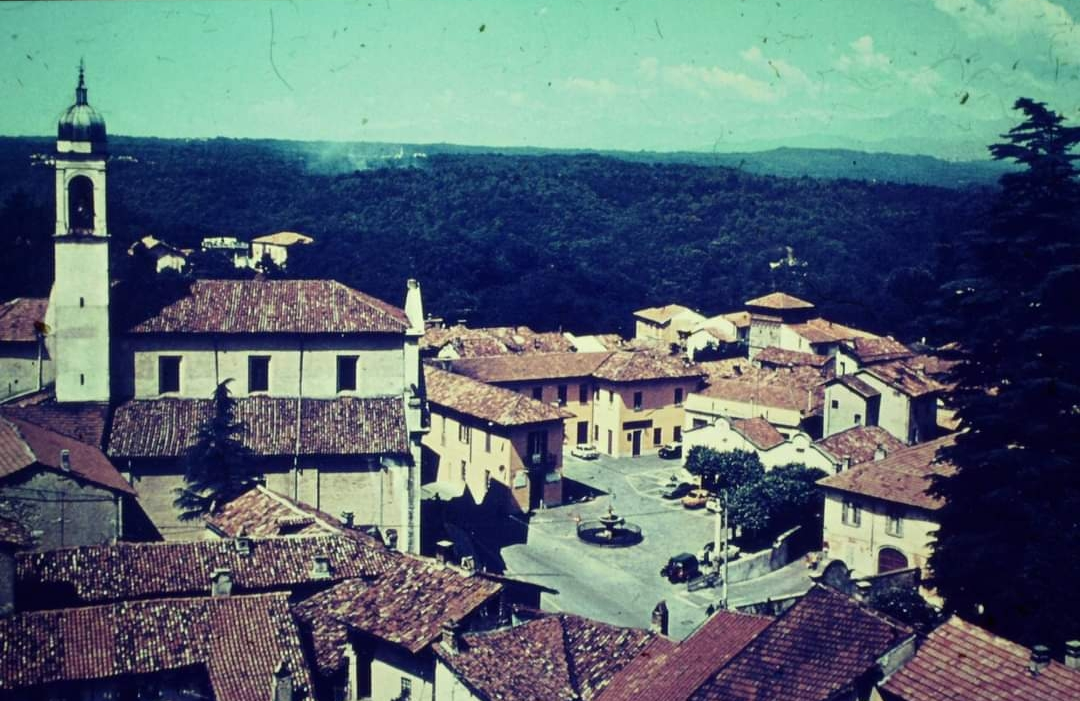

- Coat of arms

- Location within Italy Location within Lombardy
- Coordinates: 45°42′N 08°39′E
- Country: Italy
- Region: Lombardy
- Province: Varese (VA)

Government
  - Mayor: Claudio Ventimiglia

Area
  - Total: 7 km^{2} (2.7 sq mi)
- Elevation: 280 m (920 ft)

Population (31 December 2010)
  - Total: 2,694
  - Density: 380/km^{2} (1,000/sq mi)
- Demonym: Golasecchesi
- Time zone: UTC+1 (CET)
  - Summer (DST): UTC+2 (CEST)
- Postal code: 21010
- Dialing code: 0331
- Website: Official website

Golasecca (Varesotto: Vorasecca or Gorasecca) is a town and comune in the province of Varese, Lombardy (Northern Italy).

It has given its name to the Golasecca culture, a prehistoric civilization who lived in the Ticino River area from the Bronze Age until the 1st century BC.
