= Anna Piaggi =

Italian fashion writer (1931–2012)

Anna Maria Piaggi
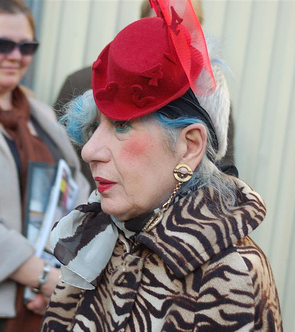
- Born: 22 March 1931; Milan, Italy
- Died: 7 August 2012 (aged 81); Milan, Italy
- Occupation: Fashion journalist
- Spouse: Alfa Castaldi
- Writing career
- Language: Italian

Anna Maria Piaggi (22 March 1931 – 7 August 2012) was an Italian fashion writer. She was known for her bright blue hair, liberal use of make-up, and her sense of style that mixed vintage and contemporary fashion.

== Career ==
Piaggi was born in Milan on 22 March 1931. She worked as a translator for an Italian publishing company Mondadori, then wrote for fashion magazines such as the Italian edition of Vogue and, in the 1980s, the avant-garde magazine Vanity. From 1988 she designed double page spreads in the Italian Vogue, where her artistic flair was given free expression in a montage of images and text, with layout by Luca Stoppini. These networks of images and ideas built upon Piaggi's awareness of fashion and art history to provide an open-ended attempt at understanding fashion designers' influences.

She used a bright red Olivetti "Valentina" manual typewriter designed by Ettore Sottsass in 1969. She was recognized at runway shows by her distinct style of dress, and after her death the Victoria and Albert Museum in London held an exhibition of her wardrobe.

Piaggi appeared in the documentary Bill Cunningham New York about The New York Times fashion and social photographer Bill Cunningham.

== Personal life ==
Piaggi married the photographer Alfa Castaldi in 1962 in New York. Castaldi died in 1995. Piaggi died in Milan on 7 August 2012.

== Books ==
- (with Karl Lagerfeld) Karl Lagerfeld: A Fashion Journal. Thames and Hudson, 1986. ISBN 0500013950
- (with Gianni Brera) Africa di Missoni per Italia 90. Edizioni Electa, 1990. ISBN 8843534106
- Anna Piaggi's Fashion Algebra. Thames and Hudson, 1998. ISBN 0500018766
- Doppie pagine di Anna Piaggi in Vogue. Leonardo Arte, 1998. ISBN 8878138835
- (with Anna Wintour, Michael Roberts, André Leon Talley and Manolo Blahnik) Manolo Blahnik Drawings. Thames and Hudson, 2003. ISBN 050028413X
