= Vittorio Missoni =

Italian CEO of Missoni

- Born: Vittorio Missoni; 25 April 1954; Milan, Italy
- Died: 4 January 2013 (aged 58); Los Roques Archipelago, Venezuela
- Occupation: CEO of Missoni
- Board member of: Missoni
- Spouse(s): Tania Missoni; Maurizia Castiglioni
- Children: Ottavio, Giacomo and Marco
- Parent(s): Ottavio Missoni; Rosita Missoni
- Website: www.missoni.com

Vittorio Missoni (25 April 1954 – 4 January 2013) was an Italian businessman, CEO of the fashion house Missoni founded by his parents in 1953. Missoni was credited with expanding the family shop into a global brand after his parents handed control to him and his two siblings, Angela and Luca, in 1996.

== Childhood ==
Missoni was born in Gallarate, Lombardy, Italy, in 1954, to Ottavio and Rosita Missoni. His parents had opened a small knitwear store in Gallarate in 1953 shortly before he was born. They released their first articles of clothing using the Missoni label in 1958. The company, which is known for a distinctive zigzag knitwear pattern, became successful in Italy during the 1960s. The three Missoni children – Vittorio, Angela and Luca – became involved with the day-to-day operations of the family business.

== Missoni ==
In 1996, Ottavio and Rosita handed control of the Missoni fashion house to their children. Angela and Luca took responsibility for the creative direction of the Missoni line, while Vittorio Missoni handled the business aspects of the company. Vittorio Missoni initially led the marketing and manufacturing departments of Missoni. However, he was widely credited with expanding the fashion house into a full global brand after becoming Missoni's chief executive officer in Europe and the United States. Under Vittorio Missoni, the company's trademark pattern and name expanded into household and cosmetic products, including perfume and towels. A Missoni Hotel chain debuted in 2009 in Edinburgh, Scotland.

== Accidental death ==
The plane in which Missoni and his wife were flying, a forty-four-year-old Britten-Norman Islander, disappeared on 4 January 2013, after taking off from Los Roques Airport in the Los Roques archipelago, where they had been vacationing, en route to Caracas, Venezuela. His wife, Maurizia Castiglioni, and their friends, Guido Foresti and Elda Scalvenzi, as well as two crew members were also on board the plane. Right after the incident, Missoni's son insinuated that the disappearance looked more like a kidnapping.

The search for the missing aircraft took more than six months. His father, Ottavio, died in May 2013, before the plane was located.

On 27 June 2013, it was confirmed that Missoni's plane was found in the Caribbean Sea, north of the Los Roques archipelago 76-meter deep in the water. The aircraft was located by the crew of C&C Technologies' research vessel Sea Scout, an oceanographic ship, on the fifth day of their search for Missoni. In October 2013, the ANSA reported that the Venezuelan authorities had recovered five bodies including Missoni's. The Missoni family later confirmed that only the bodies of the two crew members were found and identified. Subsequently, the remains of his wife, Maurizia Castiglioni, were also confirmed. In January 2014, a year after the disappearance, the search of his body was still on. But, after 10 years, the body has never been found.

== The 10th anniversary of his death ==
On the 10th anniversary of his death, his son Ottavio remembers his father and dedicated to him the feat of participating as a debutant in the 2023 Dakar Rally. Ottavio Missoni raced the 2023 Dakar Rally with Honda CRF450R in the Rally2 class.

== See also ==
- Transaereo BN-2A-27 Islander crash
