= Sumirago =

- Comune
- Comune di Sumirago
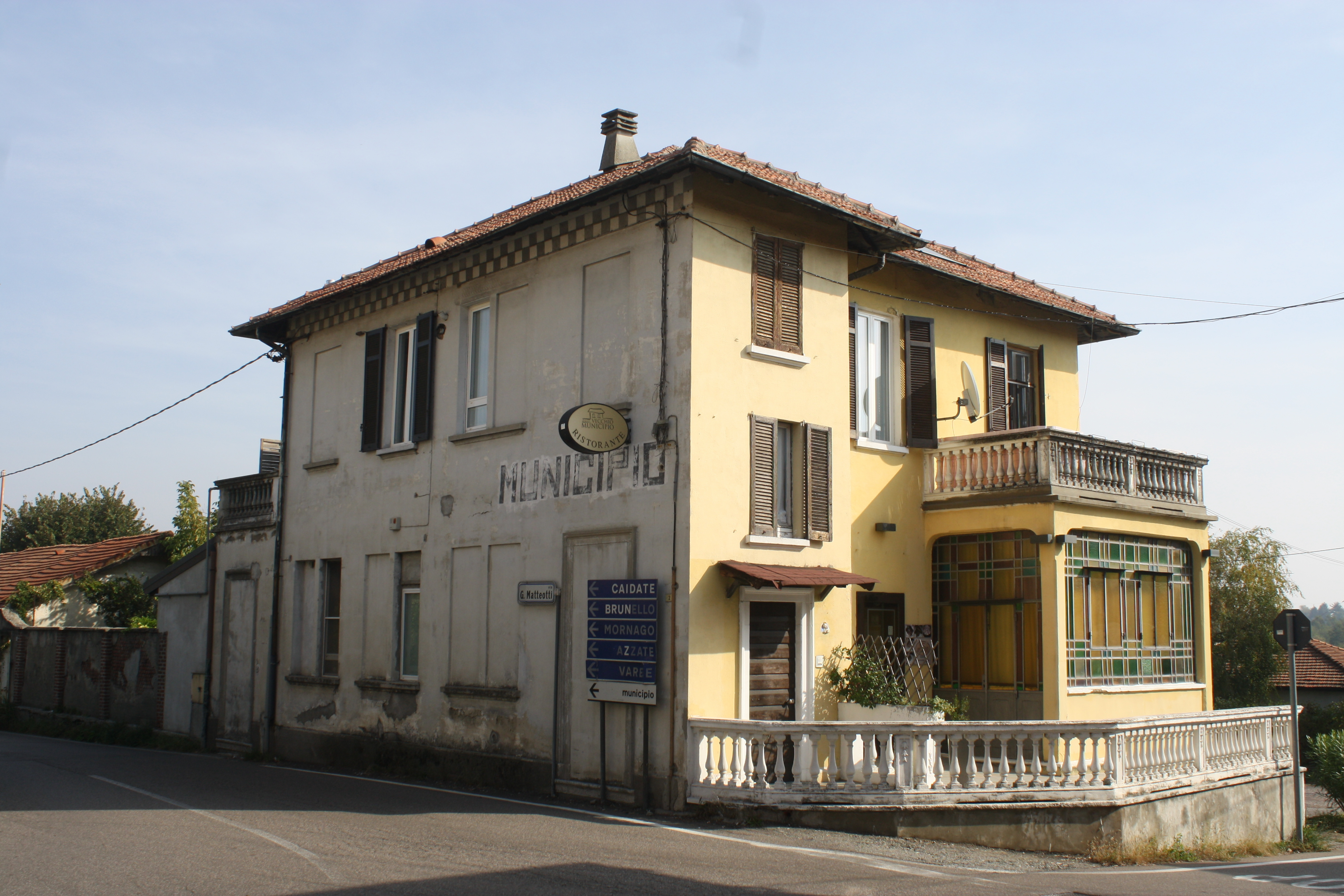

- Location within Italy Location within Lombardy
- Coordinates: 45°44′N 8°47′E
- Country: Italy
- Region: Lombardy
- Province: Province of Varese (VA)
- Frazioni: Albusciago, Caidate, Menzago, Quinzano

Area
  - Total: 11.5 km^{2} (4.4 sq mi)

Population (Dec. 2004)
  - Total: 6,032
  - Density: 525/km^{2} (1,360/sq mi)
- Demonym: Sumiraghesi
- Time zone: UTC+1 (CET)
  - Summer (DST): UTC+2 (CEST)
- Postal code: 21040
- Dialing code: 0331

Sumirago is a comune (municipality) in the Province of Varese in the Italian region Lombardy, located about 40 km (25 mi) northwest of Milan and about 10 km (6.2 mi) southwest of Varese. As of 31 December 2004, it had a population of 6,032 and an area of 11.5 km^{2} (4.4 sq mi).

== Geography ==
The municipality of Sumirago contains the frazioni (subdivisions, mainly villages and hamlets) Albusciago, Caidate, Menzago, and Quinzano.

== History ==
Sumirago is a centre of ancient origins, belonging since the very start to the city of Milan. In 1786, it started to be a part of the district of Varese, even if afterwards he returned to be a part of Milan's one.

== Demographic evolution ==
Historical population

Year	Pop.	±%
1861	2,237	—
1871	2,342	+4.7%
1881	2,424	+3.5%
1901	2,661	+9.8%
1911	2,690	+1.1%

Year	Pop.	±%
1921	2,632	−2.2%
1931	2,584	−1.8%
1936	2,507	−3.0%
1951	2,979	+18.8%
1961	3,519	+18.1%

Year	Pop.	±%
1971	4,249	+20.7%
1981	5,059	+19.1%
1991	5,296	+4.7%
2001	5,849	+10.4%

Source: Data from ISTAT
