= Dos Mosquises =

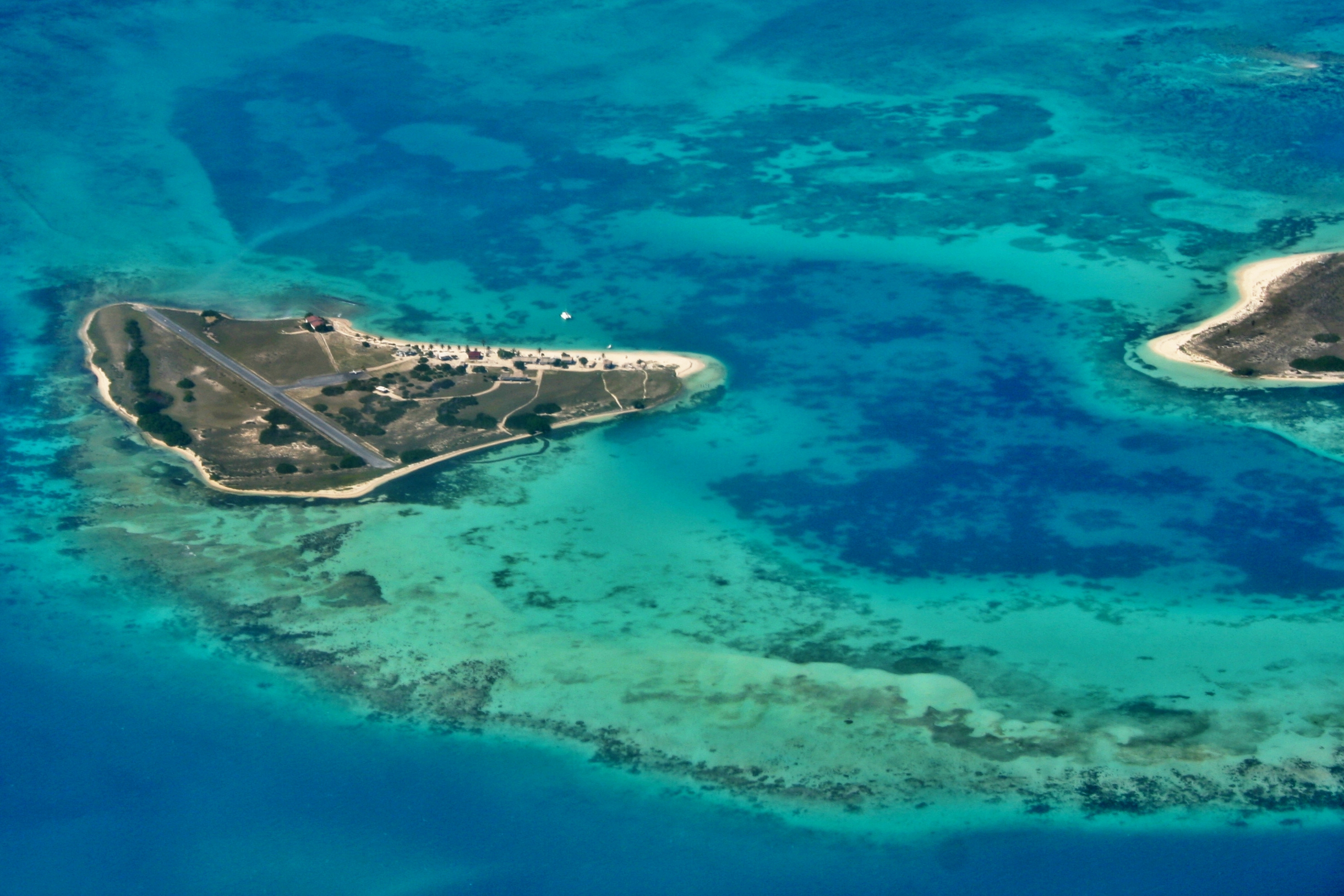
- Dos Mosquises Islands, Los Roques Archipelago

- Location within Venezuela Location within the Caribbean

Geography
- Location: Lesser Antilles; Caribbean Sea
- Coordinates: 11°47′55″N 66°53′18″W
- Archipelago: Los Roques

Administration
- Venezuela
- Federal Entity: Federal dependencies of Venezuela

Dos Mosquises are two islands that form part of the Los Roques archipelago, are administratively part of the Francisco de Miranda Island Territory (Federal Dependencies of Venezuela), and are located in the Lesser Antilles in the Caribbean Sea.

== Location ==
They are in the north of Venezuela, in the southwest of "Los Roques National Park". North of Cayo Sal and Cayo Pelona, southeast of Cayo de Agua and Bequevé, and southwest of Gran Roque.

== Member Islands ==
These are two keys or islands very close to each other:

- North Dos Mosquises (Dos Mosquises Norte)
- South Dos Mosquises (Dos Mosquises Sur)

== Research Station ==
Cayo Dos Mosquises Sur, unlike other cays of Los Roques, has the particularity of housing a Marine Biology Research Station built in 1976 and managed by the Los Roques Scientific Foundation (Fundación Científica Los Roques). In addition to having several research facilities, they have a sea turtle breeding and protection program, which makes the key be visited by specialists from various parts of the world.

On the island there is an ongoing educational program to raise awareness about the importance of conserving the Los Roques ecosystem.

== See also ==
- Cayo de Agua
- Gran Roque

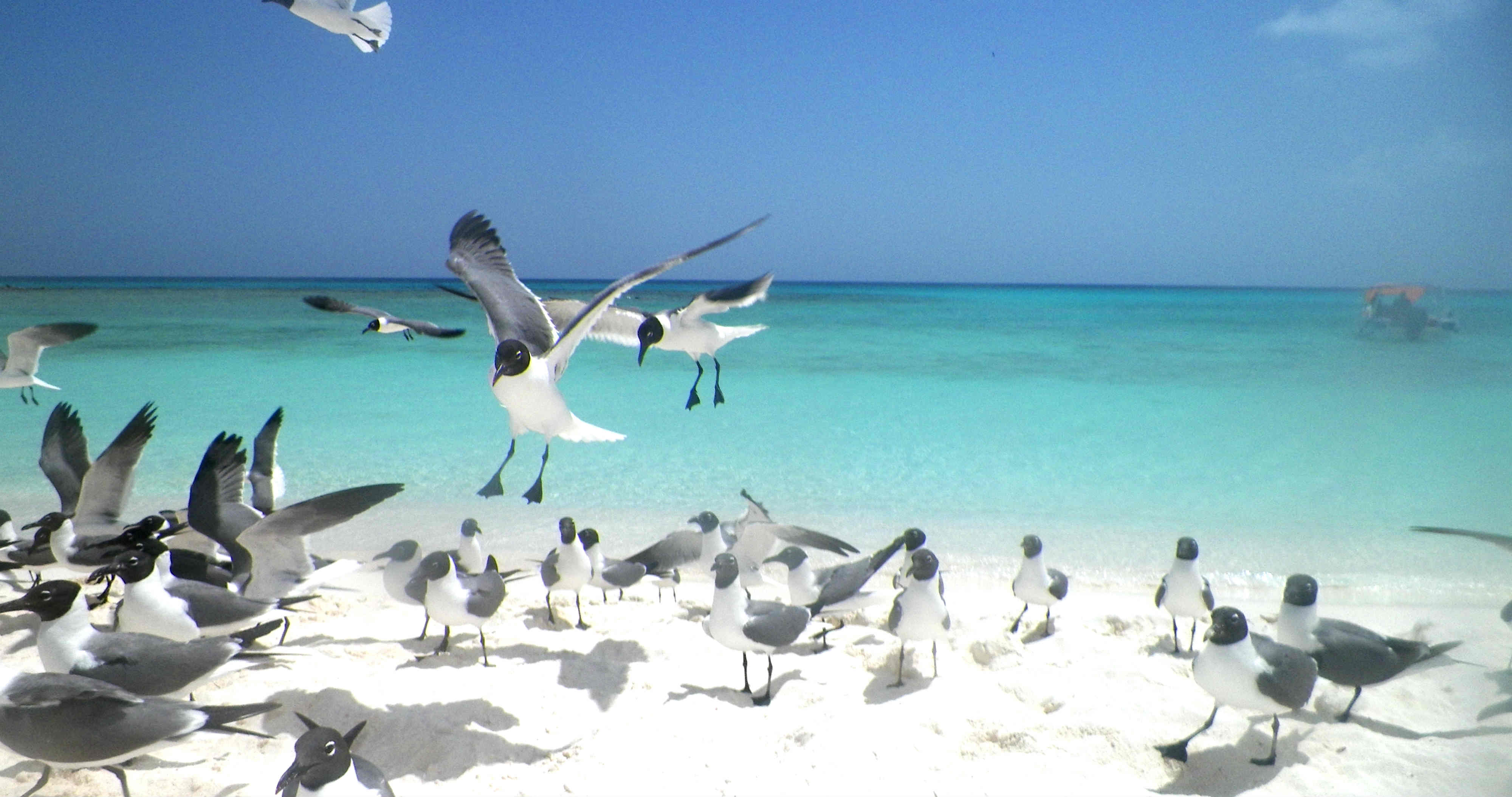
The Birds that are common in Dos Mosquises
