= Madrisquí =

Island belonging to the Archipelago of Los Roques

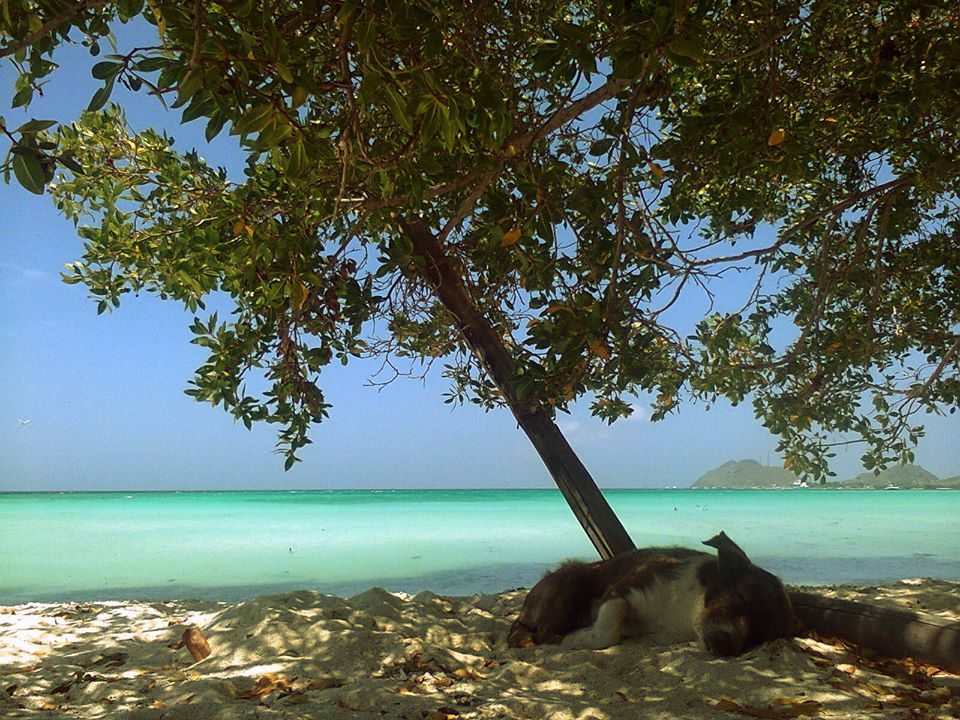
- Madrisquí Island

- Location within Venezuela Location within the Caribbean
- Other names: Cayo Madriskí, Madrizqui

Geography
- Location: Lesser Antilles; Caribbean Sea
- Coordinates: 11°56′07″N 66°39′40″W
- Archipelago: Los Roques
- Area: 18.85 ha (46.6 acres)

Administration
- Venezuela
- Federal Entity: Federal dependencies of Venezuela

Madrisquí (also known as Cayo Madriskí or Madrizqui) is a small island that belongs to the Archipelago of Los Roques, under the authority of the Francisco de Miranda Insular Territory, which is located in the waters of the Caribbean Sea of Venezuela. Located within the tourist and recreational area of the park, The island is connected to Cayo Pirata by a narrow sand barrier. It has an area of 18.85 hectares (46.6 acres).

== Location ==
The island located to the southeast of Isla Gran Roque, northeast of Cayo Pirata, north of Isla Esparquí and the Ensenada or Bajo de los Corales, and to the west of the so-called "Great Barrier Reef of the East".

== Tourism ==
Madrisquí is one of the most visited keys due to its proximity to the island of Gran Roque, which has several inns to cater to visitors, and beaches that offer recreations such as diving. The island is usually visited by fly fishing enthusiasts. On foot, you can reach Cayo Pirata, famous for its lobster fishing.

== Gallery ==
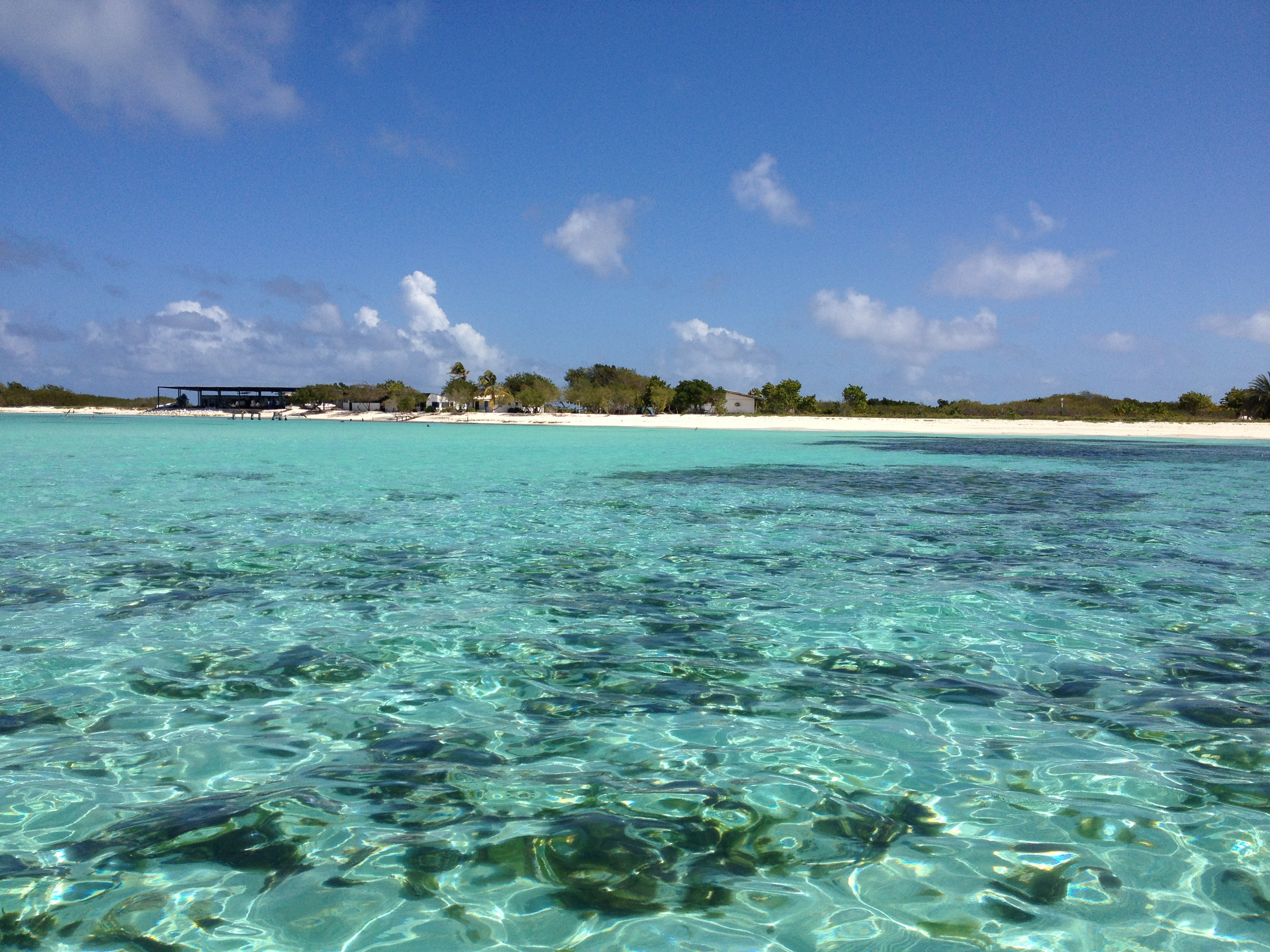

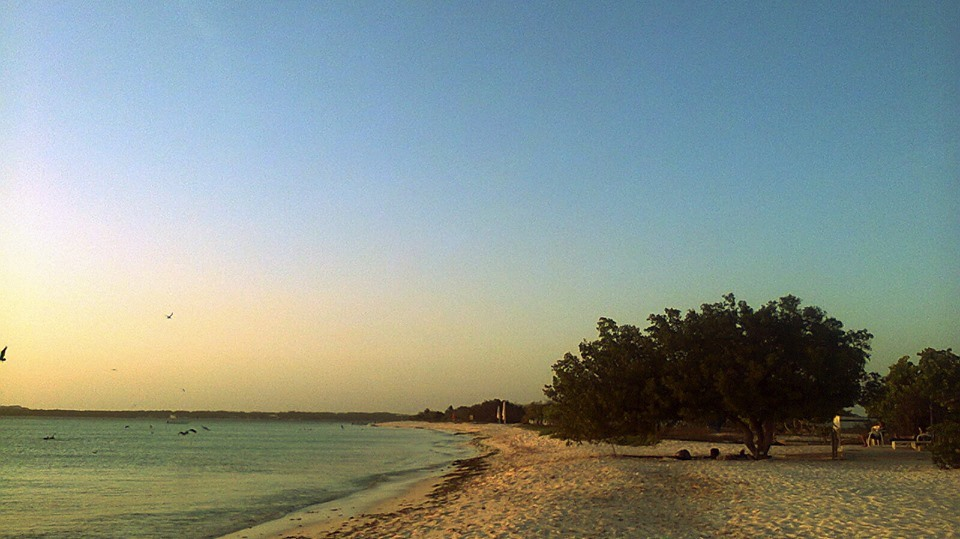

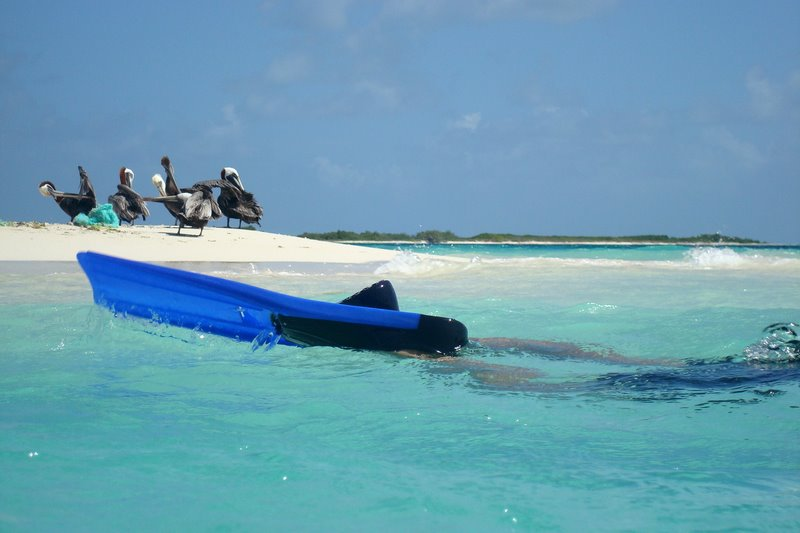

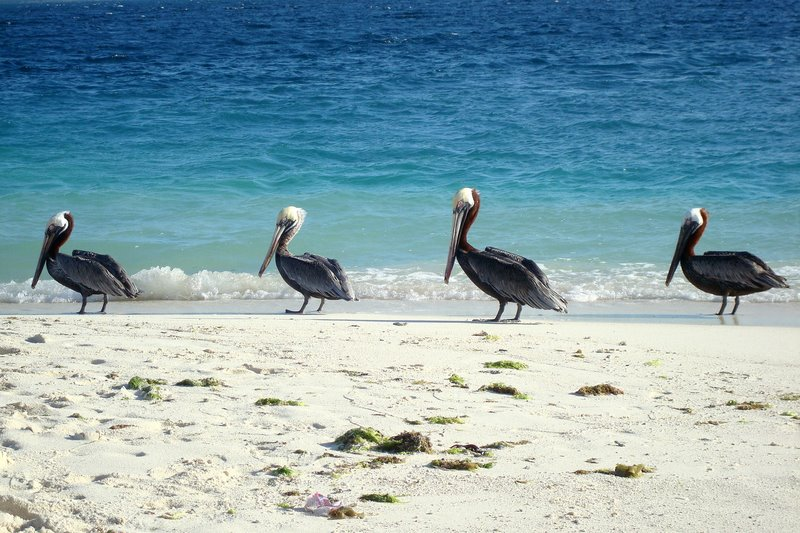

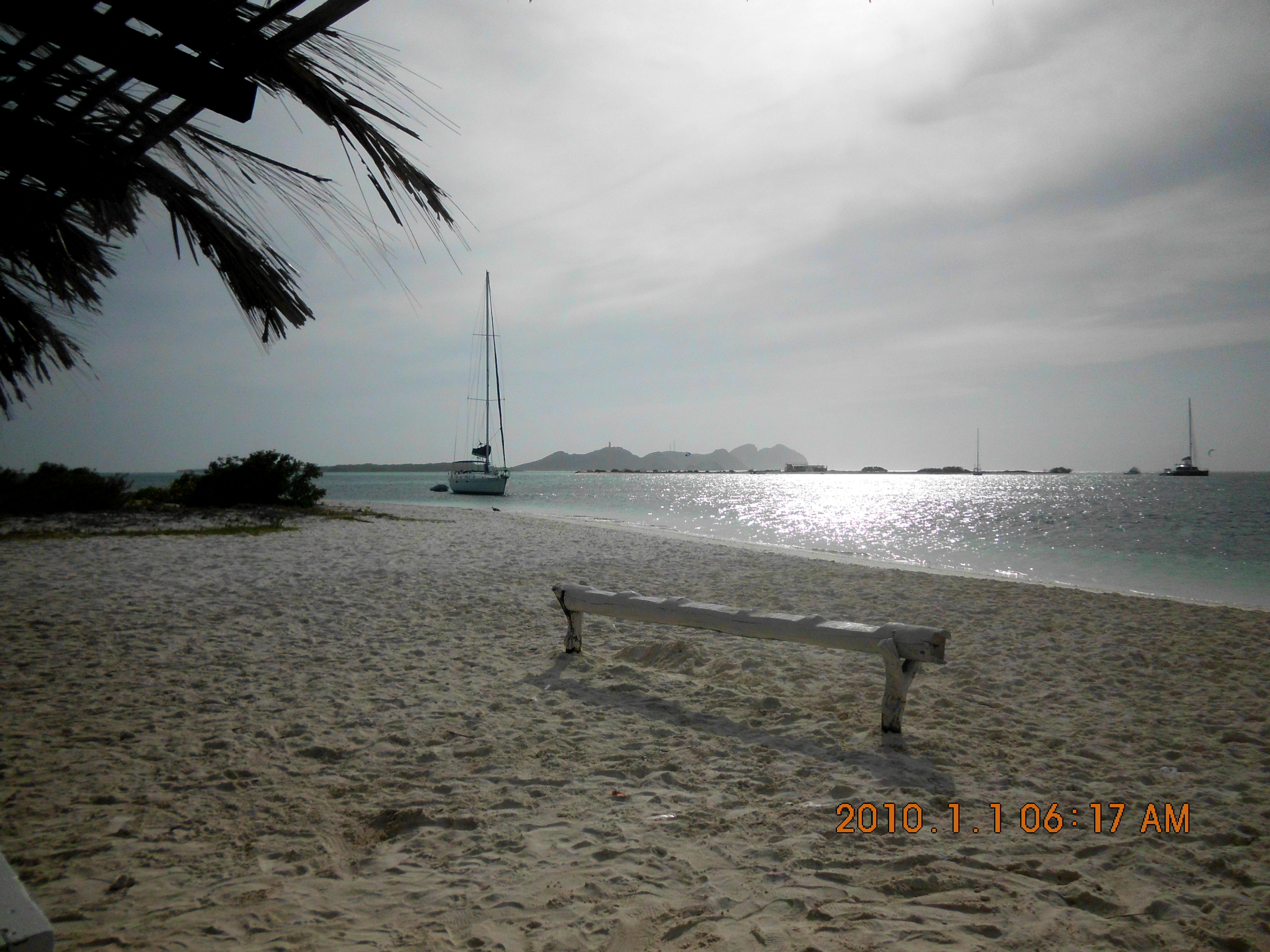

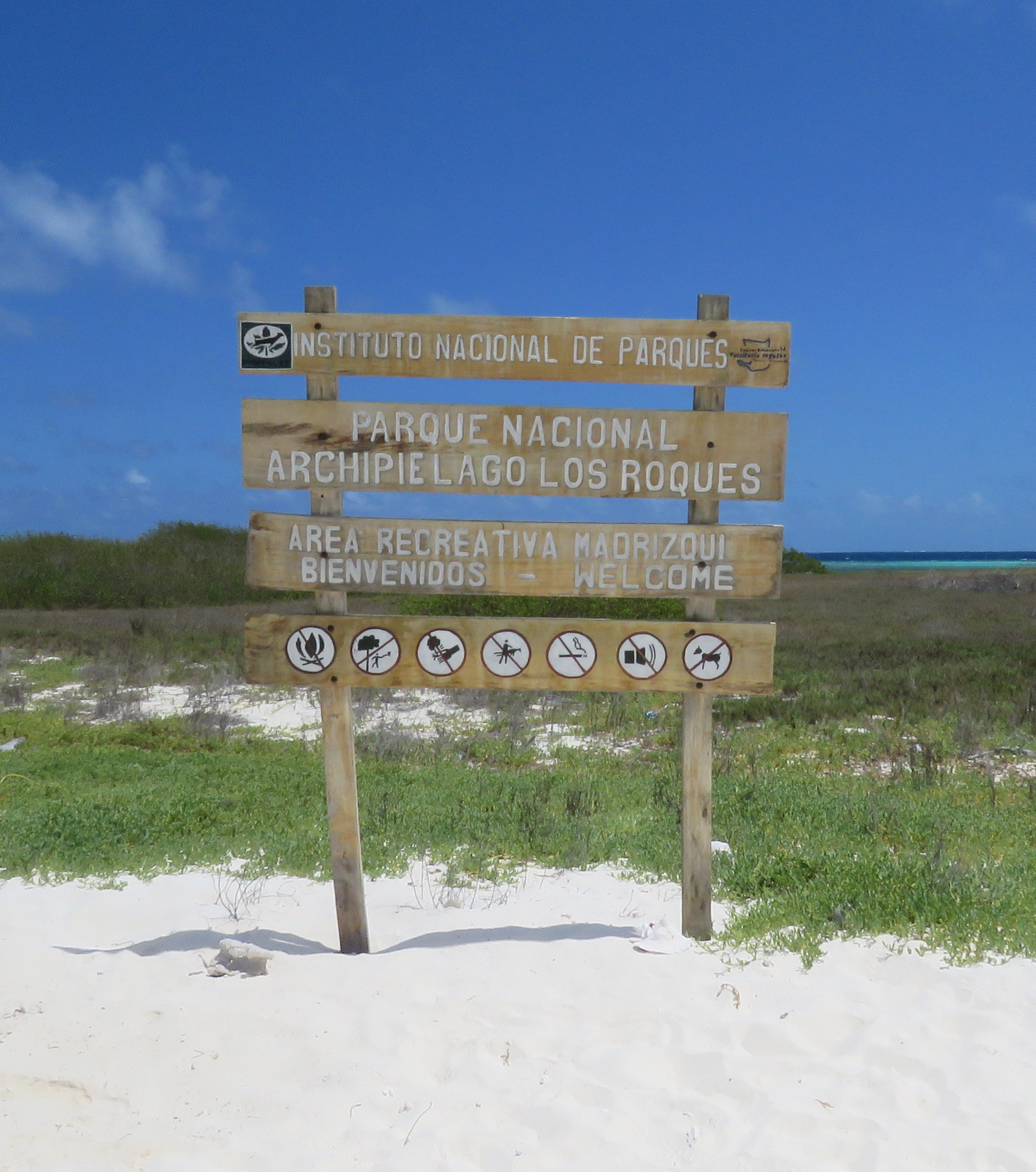

== See also ==
- Cayo de Agua
- Gran Roque
