= Cayos Bequevé =

Venezuelan islands in the Caribbean Sea

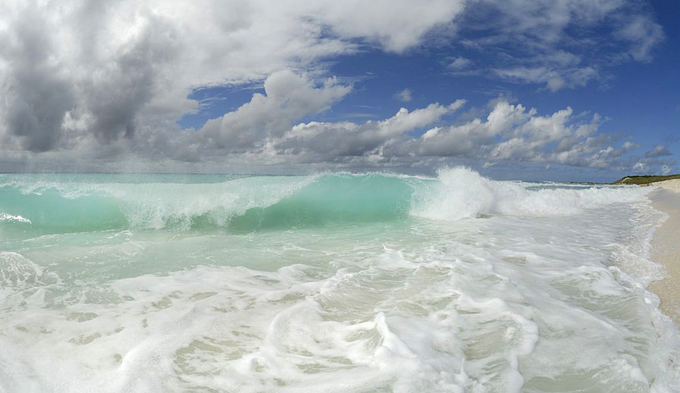
- Cayos Bequevé, Los Roques

- Location within Venezuela Location within the Caribbean

Geography
- Location: Lesser Antilles; Caribbean Sea
- Coordinates: 11°48′46″N 66°53′18″W
- Archipelago: Los Roques
- Area: 0.49 km^{2} (0.19 sq mi)

Administration
- Venezuela
- Federal Entity: Federal dependencies of Venezuela

Cayos Bequevé (also called Cayo Bequevé or Bequevé) is the name given to a group of Venezuelan islands in the southeast of the Caribbean Sea that is part of the Los Roques Archipelago, and of the Lesser Antilles that is administered as part of the Federal Dependencies of Venezuela and the National Park Archipelago of Los Roques, and is also part of the so-called Miranda Island Territory. Not to be confused with an inn of the same name but located on the island of Gran Roque.

== Location ==
They are located southwest of the park is accessible by sea like many other keys with boats that leave the dock of Gran Roque. It is an island of Coral located just in front and south of Cayo de Agua, northwest of Dos Mosquises and southwest of Cayo Carenero, in the extreme west of the islands.

== Islands ==
In spite of what its name may indicate it is actually 2 islands: Cayo Bequevé North (Norte) and Cayo Bequevé South (Sur), so they can also be known as the Bequevé Islands or Cayos Bequevé.

- Cayo Bequevé Norte has an area of 34 hectares or 0.341 square kilometers and is 4.3 kilometers long.
- Cayo Bequevé Sur, is much smaller and is 15.13 hectares or 0.1513 square kilometers and 1.76 kilometers long.

In total both islands total 49.23 hectares or 0.49 square kilometers, so they are equivalent or similar in size to Vatican City (44 hectares).

== Tourism ==
Cayo Bequeve is popular within the archipelago thanks to the beauty of its white sands and solitary beaches, the birds that can be found in its surroundings and the fact that it forms with other neighboring keys a small natural swimming pool, there are also freshwater wells, one of the most practiced activities is diving.

== See also ==
- Cayo de Agua
- Gran Roque
