= Los Roques Archipelago =

Federal dependency of Venezuela

Los Roques Archipiélago
Native name: Dependencia Federal Archipiélago Los Roques Nickname: Los Roques
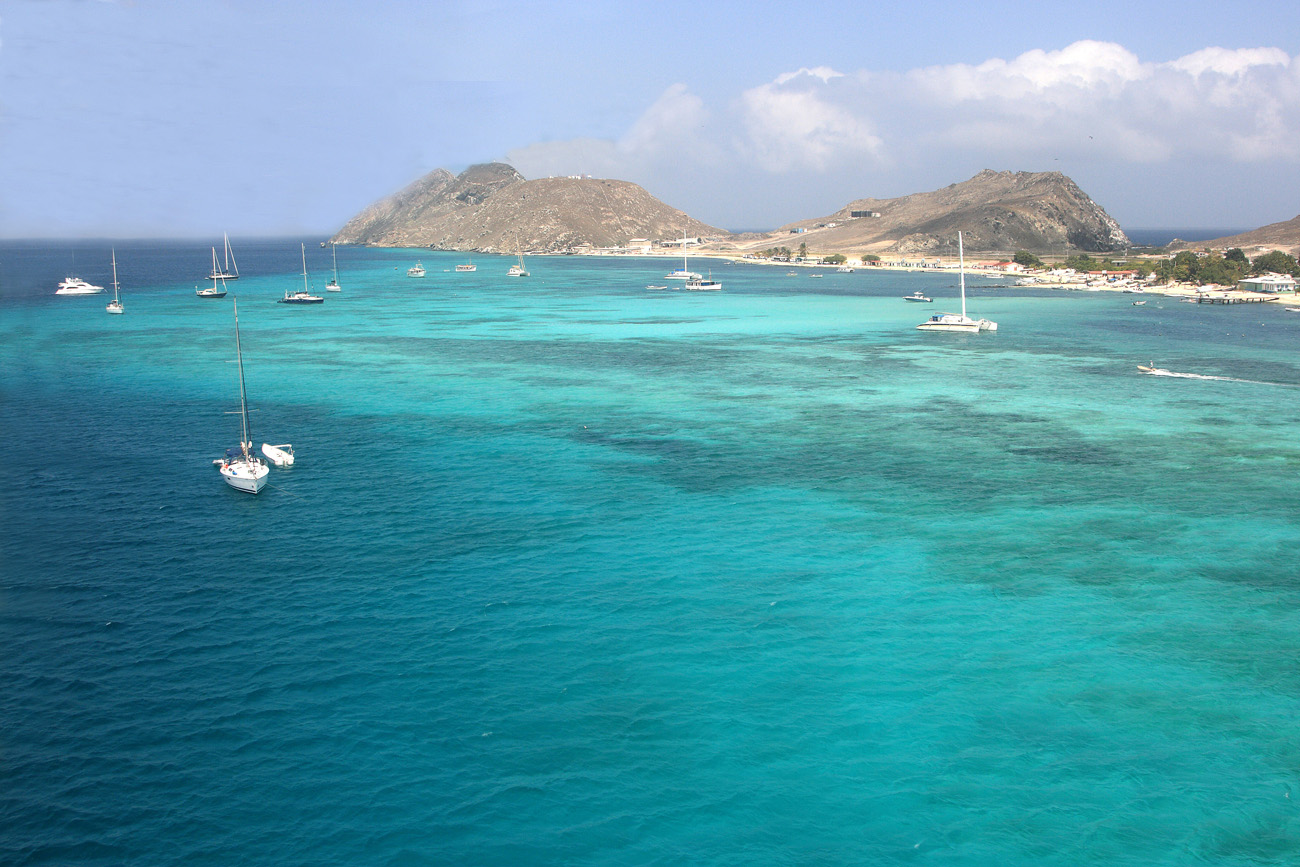
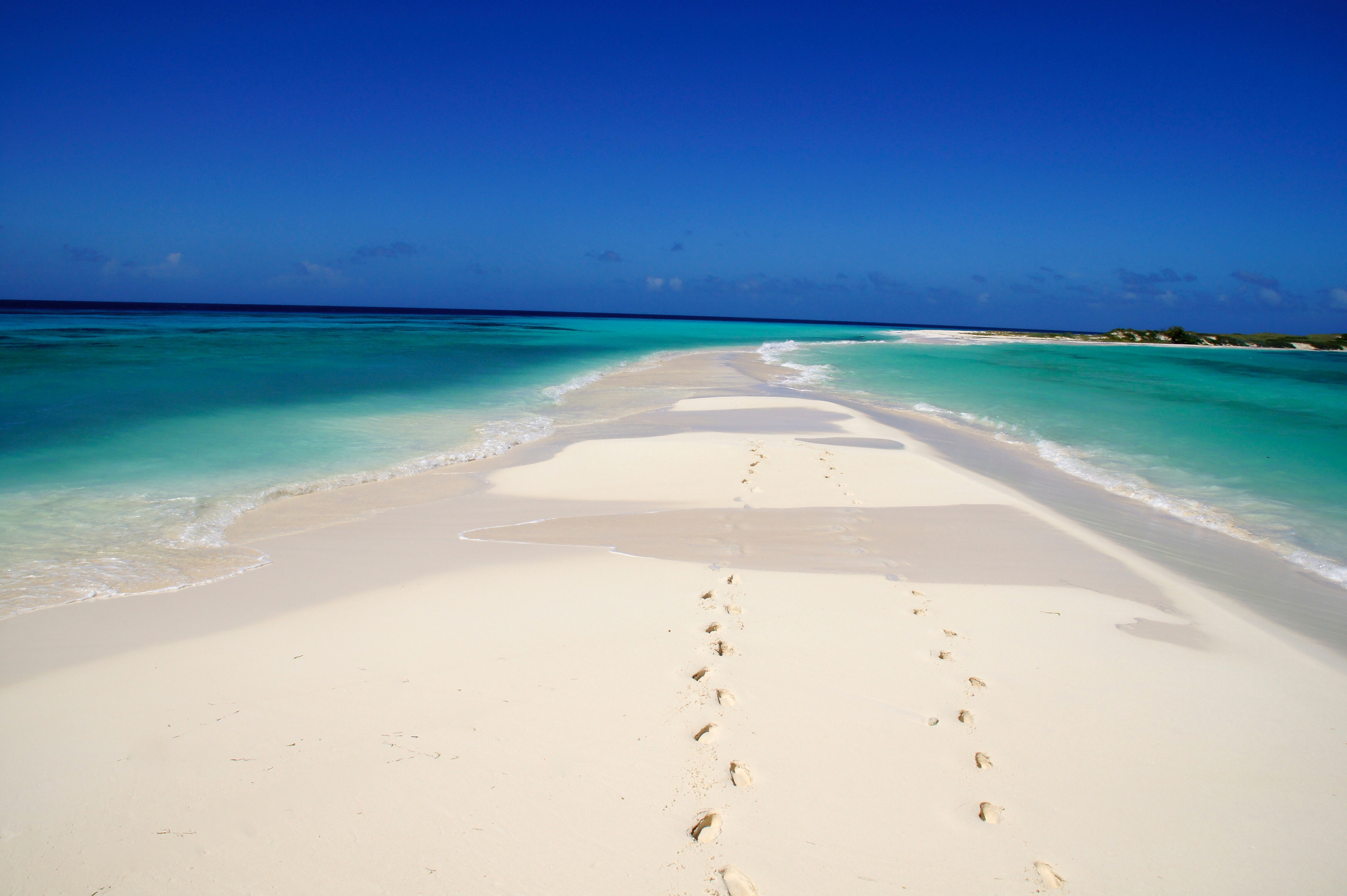
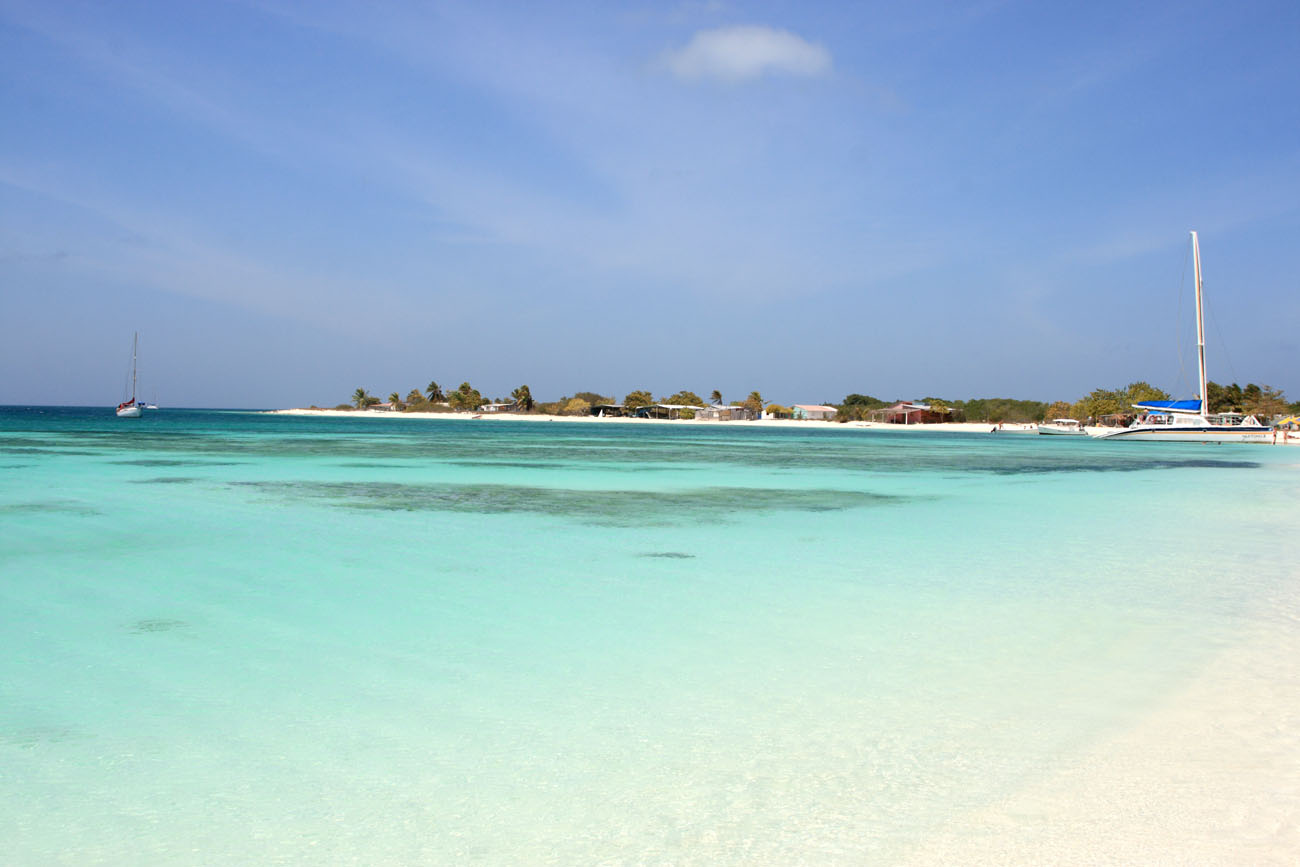
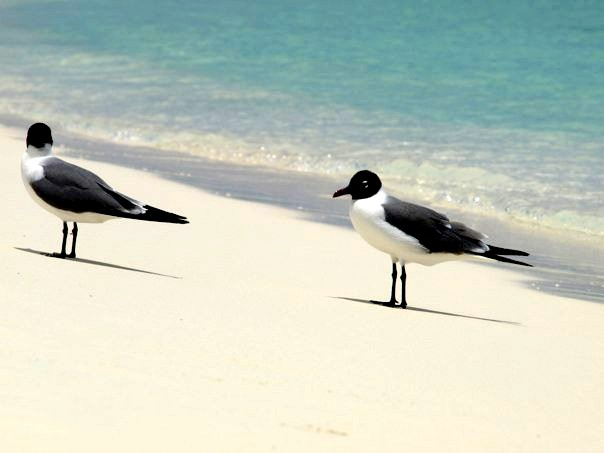
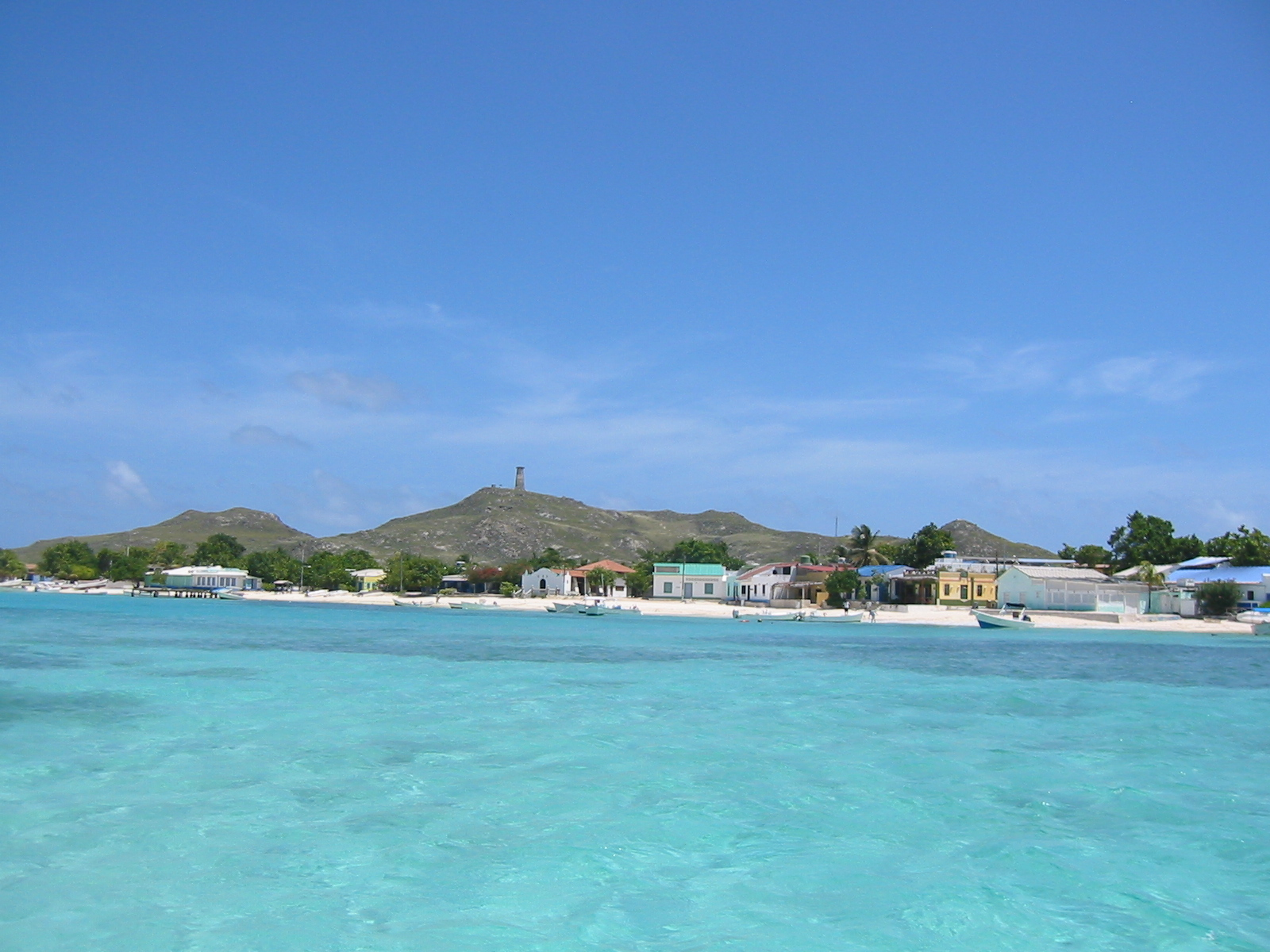
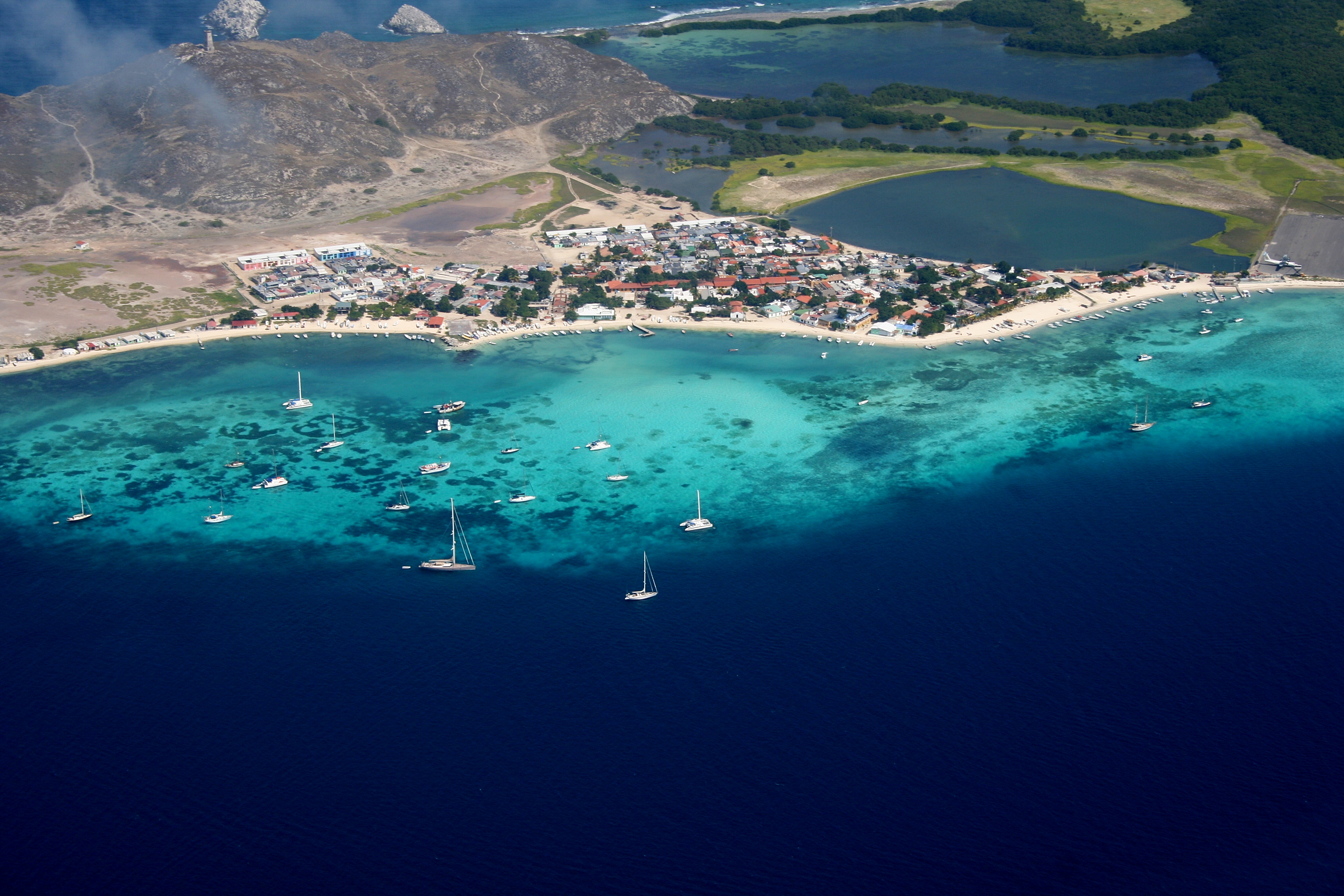
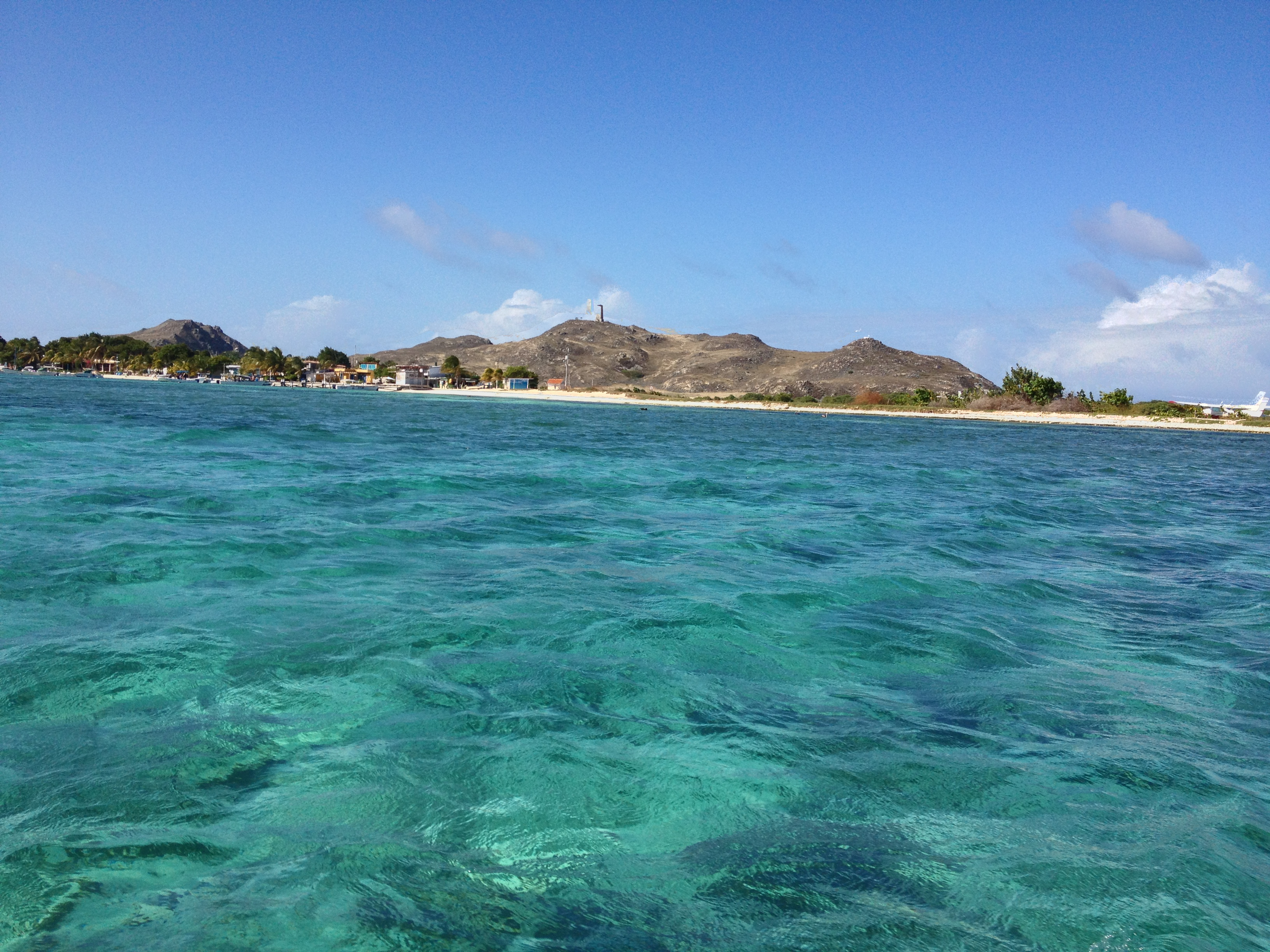
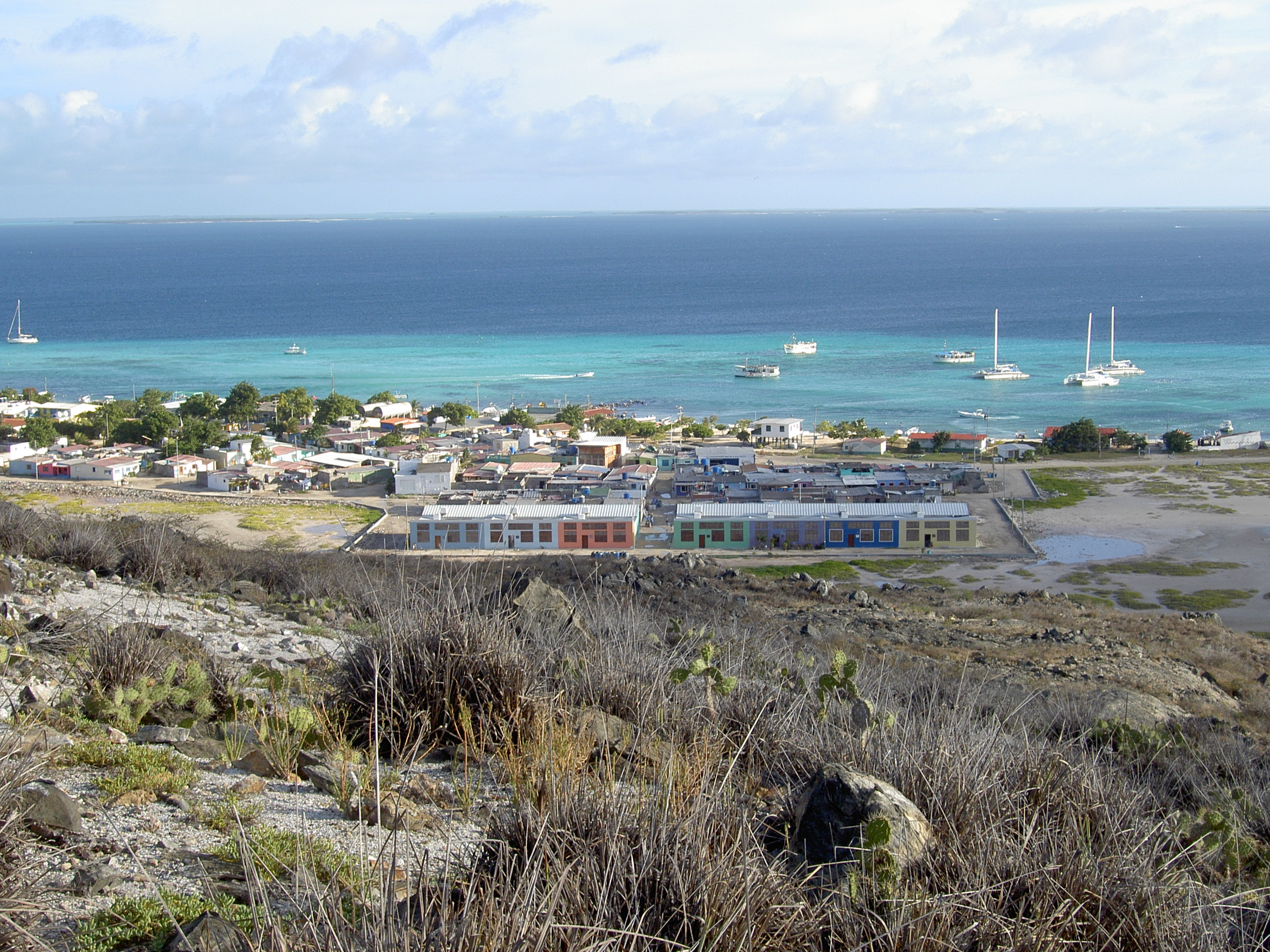

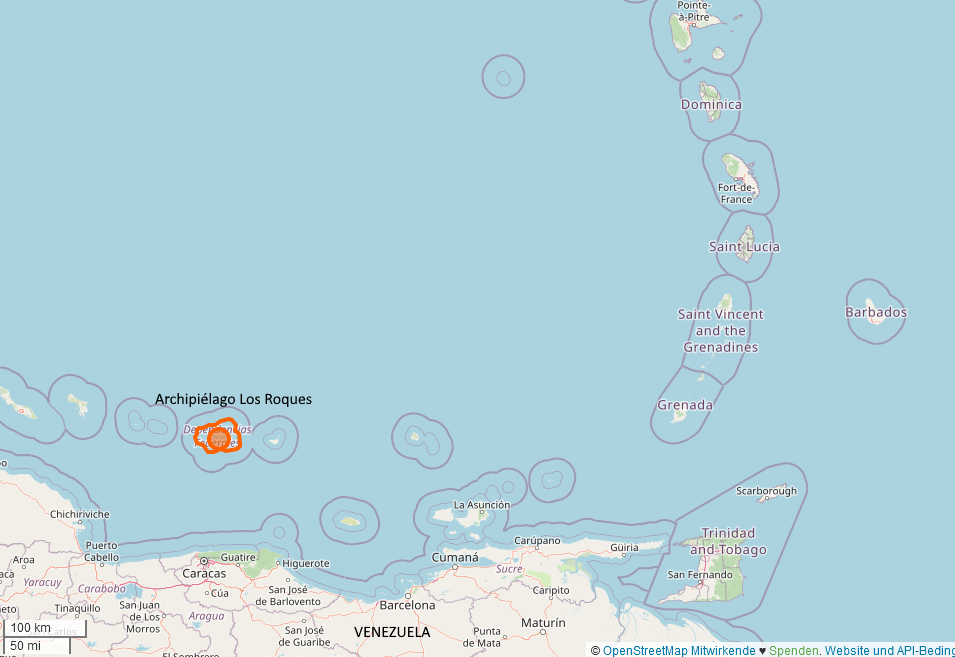
- Location in the Leeward Antilles

- Location within Venezuela Location within the Caribbean

Geography
- Location: Caribbean Sea
- Coordinates: 11°51′27″N 66°45′27″W
- Archipelago: Leeward Antilles
- Total islands: 350
- Major islands: Gran Roque
- Area: 40.61 km^{2} (15.68 sq mi)
- Highest elevation: 120 m (390 ft)
- Highest point: Cerro El Cabezón

Administration
- (Venezuela)
- Federal dependencies of Venezuela
- Largest settlement: Gran Roque

Demographics
- Population: 3,100 (2014)
- Pop. density: 44.32/km^{2} (114.79/sq mi)

Ramsar Wetland
- Official name: Parque Nacional Archipiélago Los Roques
- Designated: 4 September 1996
- Reference no.: 856

The Los Roques Archipelago (Spanish: Archipiélago de Los Roques) is a federal dependency of Venezuela consisting of approximately 350 islands, cays, and islets in a total area of 40.61 km^{2} (15.68 mi^{2}). The archipelago is located 128 km (80 mi) directly north of the port of La Guaira, in the Caribbean Sea.

The islands' pristine coral reef attracts many wealthy visitors, especially from Europe, some of whom come in their own yachts and anchor in the inner, protected shallow waters. Development and tourism are controlled.

== History ==
=== Prehistory ===
Its first settlers were the Caribbean aborigines who visited the islands to collect botutos (large sea snails), fish, hunt turtles and extract salt. There are still some constructions of salt flats with dikes, stone paths and remains of houses that were created at this time known as the time of exploitation of salt. But the permanent occupation arises with the arrival of fishermen from Margarita Island, who were bringing their families and settling in Los Roques.

=== Spanish colony ===
The islands were sighted by early Spanish navigators, and in 1589 the governor of the Venezuelan province ordered the formal takeover of these islands on behalf of the colony.

The Dutch considered Los Roques to belong to their island territory of Curaçao because of its proximity to Bonaire which also belonged to the Dutch. The author M.D. Teenstra in 1836 still writes (in his book The Dutch West Indies): "The Government of Curaçao also includes the uninhabited islets and rocks Little Curaçao, Aves, Roques and Orchilla."

In the 18th century, the Sociedad Mercantil Real Compañía Guipuzcoana was established on the islands and the first islands of the archipelago (Gran Roque, Carenero, Cayo Sal, etc.) were given their names. Also at that time, temporary fishermen began to arrive, and in the 19th century the exploitation of salt mines and guano began.

=== Independent Venezuela ===
In 1871 the Venezuelan president Antonio Guzmán Blanco created by decree the Territorio Colón (Columbus Territory) which included Los Roques and other adjacent islands. The island of Gran Roque was named as the center of territorial government.

Around the year 1886 there is reference to the arrival of inhabitants coming from the nearby Netherlands Antilles, Aruba, Curaçao, etc. They left as a legacy some of the exotic names given to some islands or keys (for example Francisquí, Madrisquí, Krasquí, Selesquí). The suffix "quí" corresponds to the English term (and other languages) "key", which means Island.

At the beginning of the 20th century an epidemic of bubonic plague in La Guaira caused the Venezuelan government to authorise the use of the island of Gran Roque as a quarantine site.

In 1910, the town of Gran Roque began to consolidate with families from Margarita Island, mainly fishermen.

On 20 July 1938 the islands were integrated into the Federal Dependencies of Venezuela. The small population of 484 that inhabited it in 1941 grew to 559 in the year 1950.

Because of the wide variety of seabirds and rich aquatic life, the Venezuelan government declared Los Roques a National Park in 1972. After its declaration as a national park, the Los Roques scientific foundation (Fundación Científica de Los Roques) was created, which established its laboratories and facilities on the island of Dos Mosquises, to carry out works on archeology, fish, turtles, mollusks, corals, sponges, fishing and oceanography.

In 1978 the marine delimitation agreement between Venezuela and the Kingdom of the Netherlands was signed.

In 1987, the Los Roques Scientific Foundation carried out a registry, which allowed them to conclude that there were 847 inhabitants in Gran Roque. Only 663 of these were permanent inhabitants, and the remainder were sailors residing on Isla Margarita.

=== Autonomy ===
In order to give greater dynamism to its administration and promote the sustainable development of the islands on 2 November 1990, according to Presidential Decree 1214, the figure of the Single Authority of Los Roques Area (Autoridad Única de Área) was created, which would continue as part of the Federal Dependencies but with a special administrative status.

In October 2011 all the islands of the Los Roques archipelago are integrated to the Miranda Insular Territory (Territorio Insular Francisco de Miranda) according to presidential decree 8549 of 1 November 2011, published in the official gazette N° 39797, a subdivision of the Federal Dependencies with capital in Gran Roque.

In 2012 the Venezuelan National Navy named a Damen Stan Lander 5612 landing craft after the islands. In 2012, the Organic Regulations of the Head of Government of the Insular Territory of Miranda were approved, which establishes the organization of the government in Los Roques, La Orchila and Las Aves. In 2014 the government of the Territory together with the inhabitants of Los Roques established the Norms of Communal Coexistence of the Insular Territory Francisco de Miranda in the Archipelago of Los Roques.

In September 2019 a new airport was inaugurated in Los Roques, with an expanded runway, new facilities with a national and international area, waiting room and other related structures.

== Geography ==
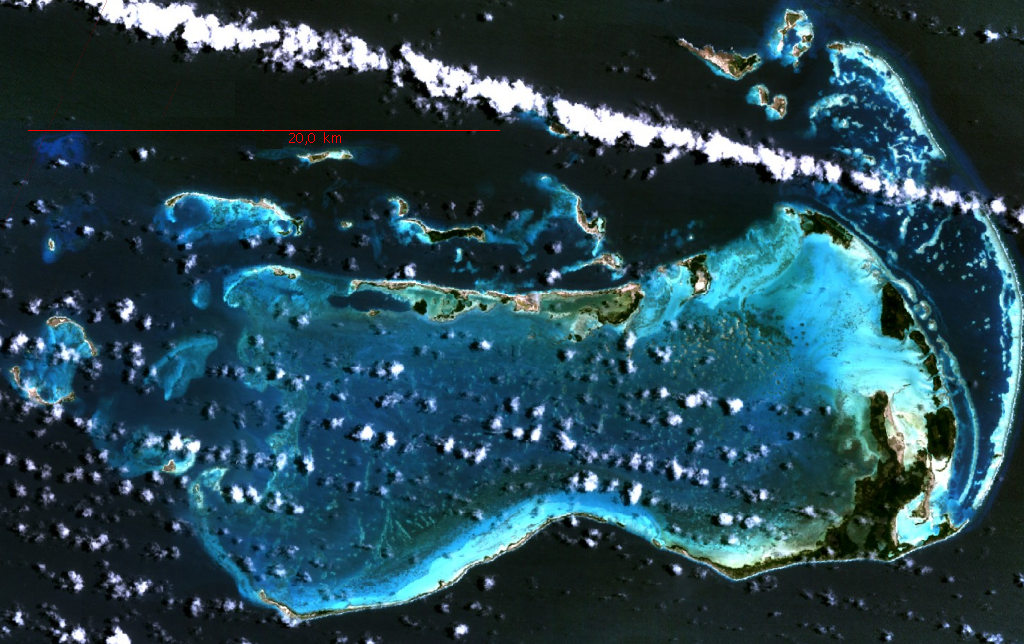
Satellite image of the Los Roques archipelago

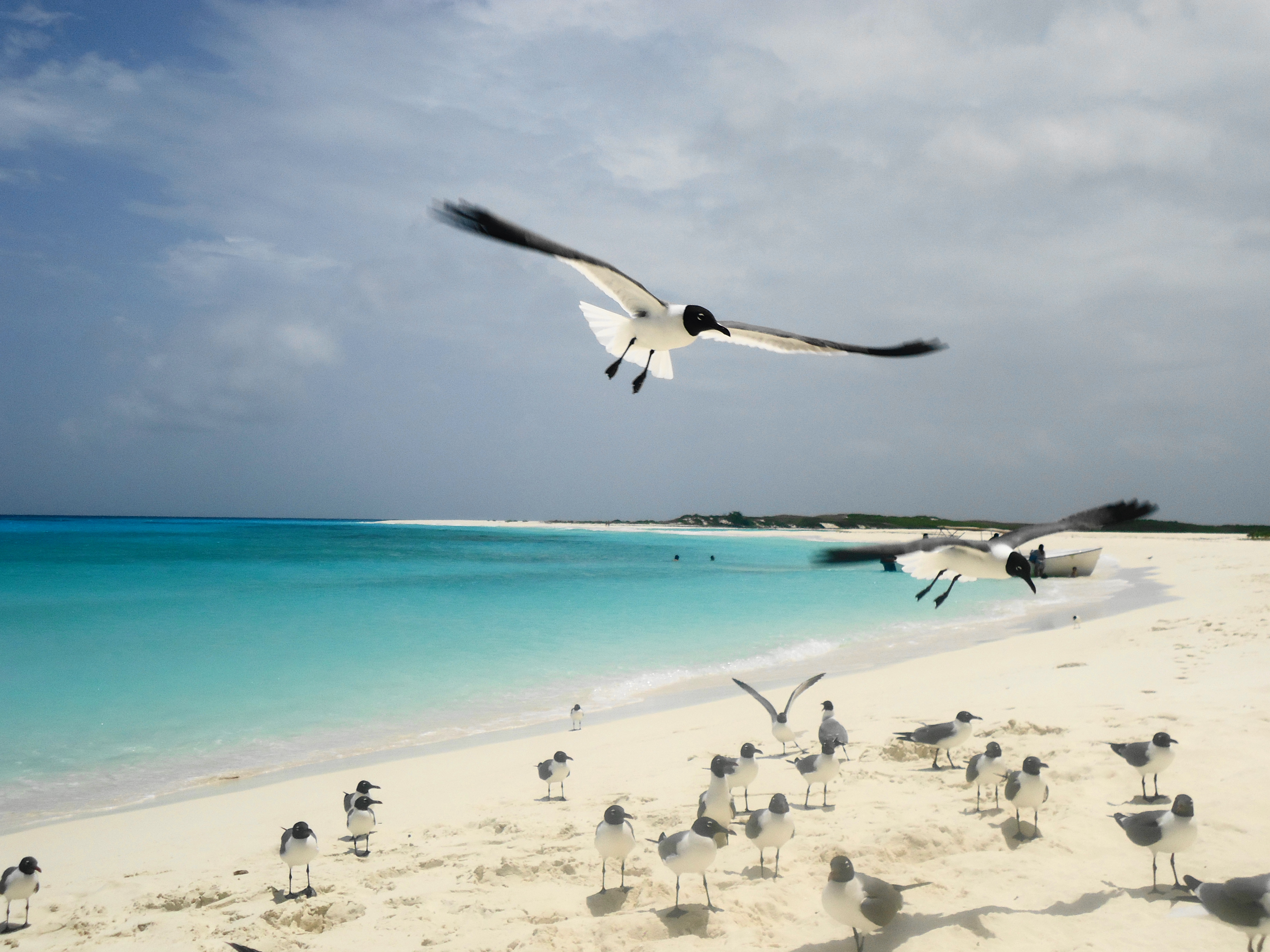
Cayo de Agua, Los Roques, Venezuela

The major islands of the archipelago have an atoll structure, with two external barriers formed by coral communities, and an inner lagoon and sandy shallows. The park consists of 40.61 km^{2} (15.68 sq mi), 1,500 km^{2} (580 sq mi) of coral reefs, 42 coral cays surrounding a shallow central lagoon of 400 km^{2} (150 sq mi), two barrier reefs (24 km (15 mi) east and 32 km (20 mi) south) and 300 sand banks, islands and cays, ranging in size from Cayo Grande (15.1 km^{2} (5.8 sq mi)) to the Gran Roque (1.7 km^{2} (0.66 sq mi)). Other important islands are Francisqui, Nordisqui, Madrisquí, and Crasqui.

=== Climate ===
The climate is warm and dry, with average annual temperature of 27.3 °C (81.1 °F) in July and August, reaches a maximum of 34 °, and between September and January are presented occasional rain, with relative humidity 83% annually. Rainfall is 256.6 mm (10.10 in) / year; minimum 6.6 mm (0.26 in) (April) and maximum 52.2 mm (2.06 in) (November).

The wind blows constantly throughout the year, tempering the heat. The amount of sunlight in Los Roques is good throughout the year, as clear skies prevail.

=== Zones of the national park ===
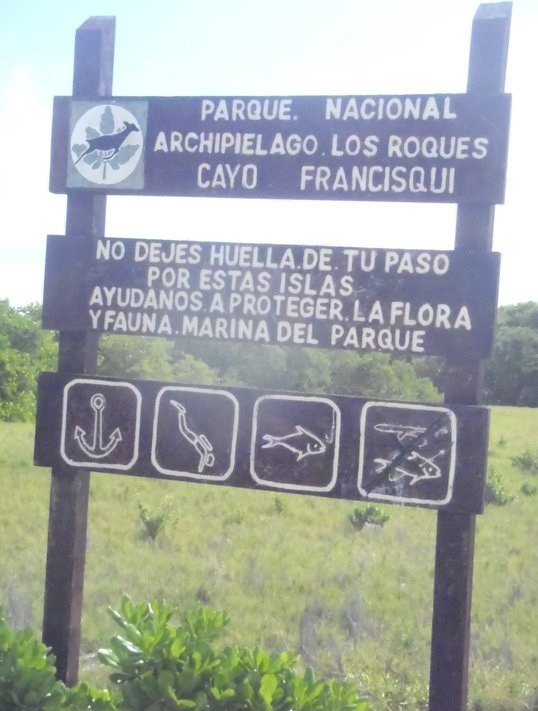
Sign of the Venezuelan National Parks Institute on the island of Francisquí

As a result of its declaration as a national park in 1972, a protection plan was created, which establishes certain regulations on the island to preserve the state of these ecosystems. This plan is known as zoning, which consists of the separation of zones management, which are protected depending on their fragility and importance, and depending on this certain activities are allowed. Which means that the more protection an area has, the fewer activities will be allowed

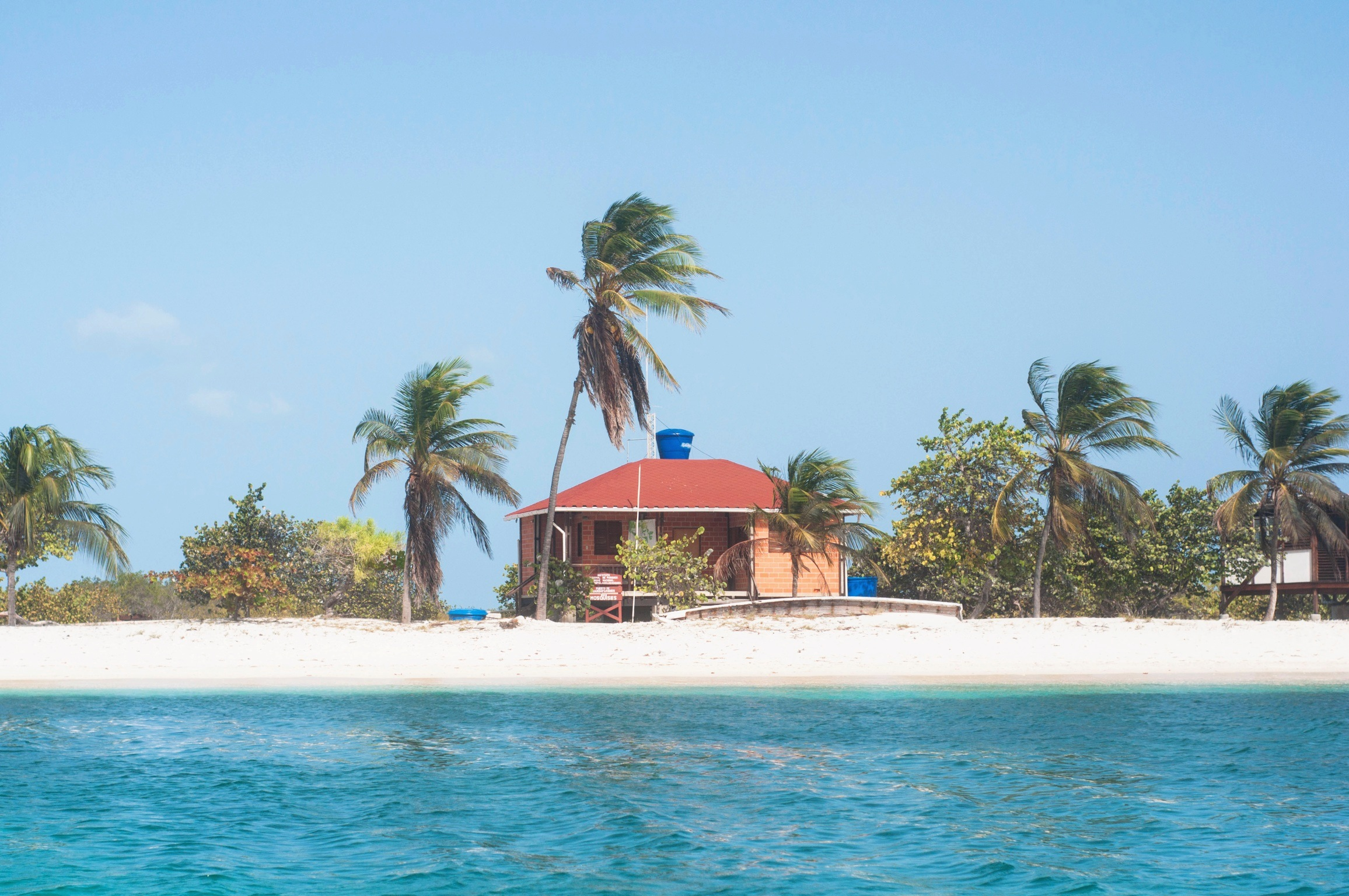
Dos Mosquises Islands, Los Roques

The Archipelago de Los Roques national park has seven management zones, the Integral Protection zone, the Primitive Marina, the Managed Natural Environment, Recreation Zone, of Cultural Historical Interest and Archeopaleontology, Services zone and Special Use zone. These zones are:

- The Integral Protection area, which is the most protected, and which includes the following keys: Sebastopol, Esparquí, Boca de Cote, (for its coral reefs and interesting mangroves); Los Canquises, (for the flamingos and other colonies of seabirds that breed there); Selesqui, (for being an important breeding area for sea turtles and seabirds), and Isla Larga (for the extensive coral reefs, colonies of seabirds, turtles that use this island for their reproduction). Only scientific research is allowed in this area, with prior authorization of the national park authorities.
- The second zone called the Primitiva Marina zone comprises the waters around these keys, in addition to the eastern barrier and the keys Sal, Dos Mosquises, Carenero, Cayo de Agua and Bequevé, because they are considered ecologically sensitive areas. The activities allowed in this area are boating, sailing and motor sailing along the indicated routes, swimming, snorkelling, scuba diving, sport fishing, hiking on marked trails and visiting and observing nature. in groups of no more than 15 people.

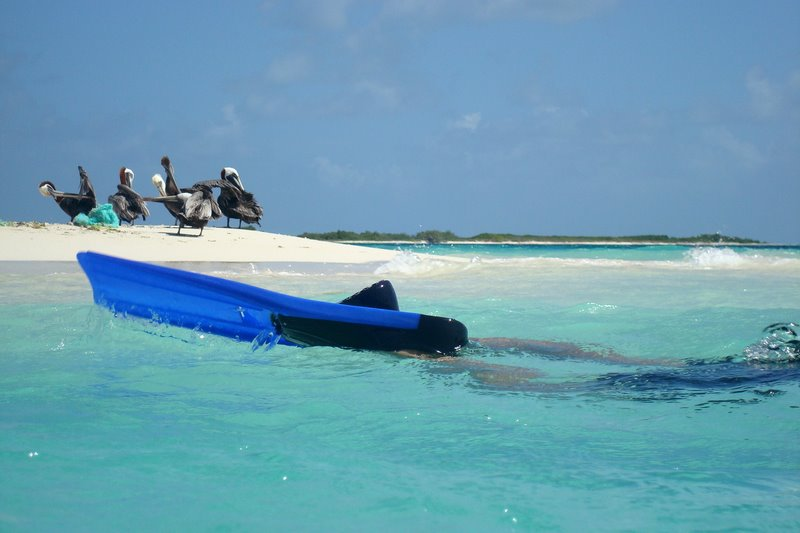
Madrisquí Island, Los Roques

- The Managed Natural Environment zone that encompasses all the keys and peripheral waters of the archipelago and where the same activities as in the Primitiva Marina zone are allowed.
- The Recreation, Services and Special Use areas are all those keys that have already been intervened, such as the Gran Roque, the navigation channel and the Dos Mosquises key. In this area all the activities mentioned above are allowed, as well as camping with their respective permission from the authorities and water sports.
- The Historical Cultural Interest and Archeopaleontology area that protects all those areas where archaeological finds have been made, some examples of this area are: Bequevé, Cayo de Agua, Dos Mosquises, Noronquí, Cayo Sal and Los Canquises.

=== Flora ===
There are several mangrove species: Rhizophora mangle, Avicennia germinans, Laguncularia racemosa and Conocarpus erectus, extensive seagrass meadows (Thalassia testudinum), halophyte species such as glass grass, red purslane or beach bell (Sesuvium portulacastrum), cacti such as a prickly pear cactus or guasábara (Opuntia caribea) and a crop or melon cactus (Melocactus caesius).

=== Fauna ===
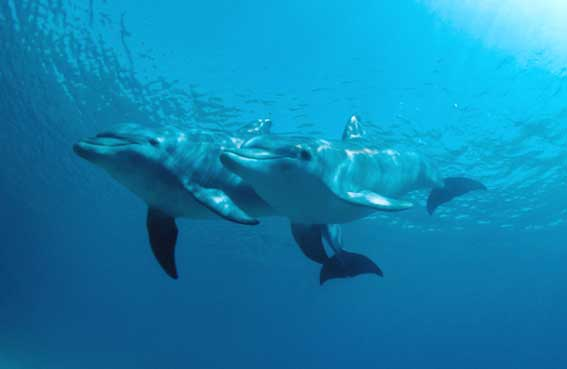
Dolphins in Los Roques

Due to extreme environmental conditions and a lack of fresh water, land animals are rare. The list is limited to a few species of iguanas and lizards, spiders and insects. The greater bulldog bat is the only indigenous land mammal.

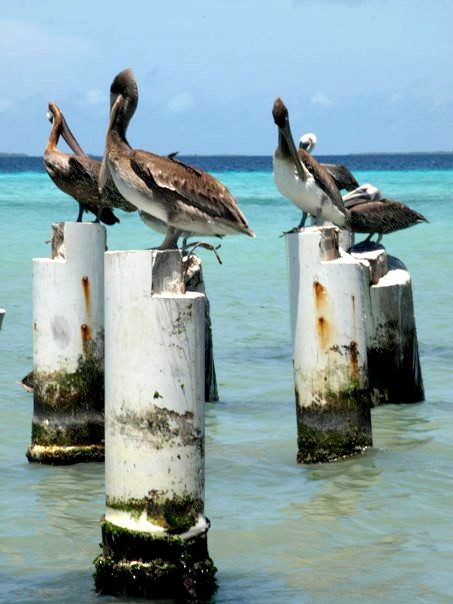
Brown pelican

It is in the water where the immense richness becomes evident: 280 species of fish, 200 species of crustaceans, 140 species of mollusks, 61 species of corals, 60 species of sponges and 45 species of sea urchins and starfish. Dolphins, whales, manta rays and sea turtles abound. Four types of threatened turtles regularly nest in the archipelago: loggerhead, green, leatherback and hawksbill sea turtles. This coastline shelters in its waters coral reefs with a wide diversity of species. In Los Roques National Park, nine different types of octocorals are located. The low concentration of octocorals is possibly due to the deeper average subsidence of the atolls in Los Roques.

The reef of Sebastopol Lagoon in Archipelago Los Roques, is an area that has been previously identified as a nursery area for lemon sharks. The most representative animals are the green sea turtle, pink queen conch, spiny lobster, typical coral reef fish and 92 species of birds.

Los Roques is a meeting point for some 50 species of migratory birds from North America. Among the most frequent birds are the brown pelican, red-footed and brown boobies, and the laughing gull or guanaguanare. Flocks of American flamingos are often seen. The archipelago, along with its surrounding waters, has been designated an Important Bird Area (IBA) by BirdLife International because it supports significant populations of many bird species.

== Government ==
Los Roques is a Federal Dependency that is administered directly by officials appointed by the central or federal government of Venezuela.

Between 1990 and 2011 the central government appointed a director for the Single Area Authority (Autoridad Única de Área) within the Federal Dependencies, but that last year the central government created the figure of the Miranda Insular Territory (Territorio Insular) that encompasses not only Los Roques but La Orchila and Las Aves Archipelago.

The headquarters of the head of government (Jefe de Gobierno) of the insular territory is the island of Gran Roque to the north of the Los Roques Archipelago.

Additionally in the island there are dependencies of other public organisms such as Inparques (National Parks Institute) since the archipelago is a national park and the National Guard of Venezuela (Guardia Nacional).

=== Executive Power ===
According to the provisions of the Organic Regulations of the Head of Government of the Miranda Island Territory, it is composed of a Head of Government, a Secretary of Government, a legal consultancy and various secretariats, coordinating offices and sub-secretariats. The head of government is an official of free appointment and removal by the president of Venezuela. He remains in office as long as he enjoys the confidence of the central government.

=== Legislative power ===
Los Roques archipelago has no legislative power of its own. Being part of the Insular Territory of Miranda (a subdivision of the Federal Dependencies of Venezuela) its budget and laws are established by the central or national government of Venezuela, through the national assembly based in Caracas, which sets the budget and controls the action of the government.

== Demographics ==
The archipelago is sparsely populated, having about 1,500 permanent inhabitants; however it receives approximately 70,000 visitors a year, many of them day-visitors who come from Caracas and the mainland.

The population of the Roques concentrates mainly on the island of Gran Roque and to a lesser extent its adjacent islets. In 1941, the population was estimated at 484 people. In 1950 it reached 559, and in 1987 663 permanent inhabitants. According to the Venezuelan census of 2001 1,209 inhabitants were counted. By 2008 it is estimated that the number inhabitants to be around 1,800.

Its growth is limited because of restrictions involving the declaration as a national park in the 1970s. Most of the population is of Margariteño origin who came to the islands mainly to engage in fishing. Since the early twentieth century there has been a small influx of foreigners (mostly Italian).

== Tourism ==
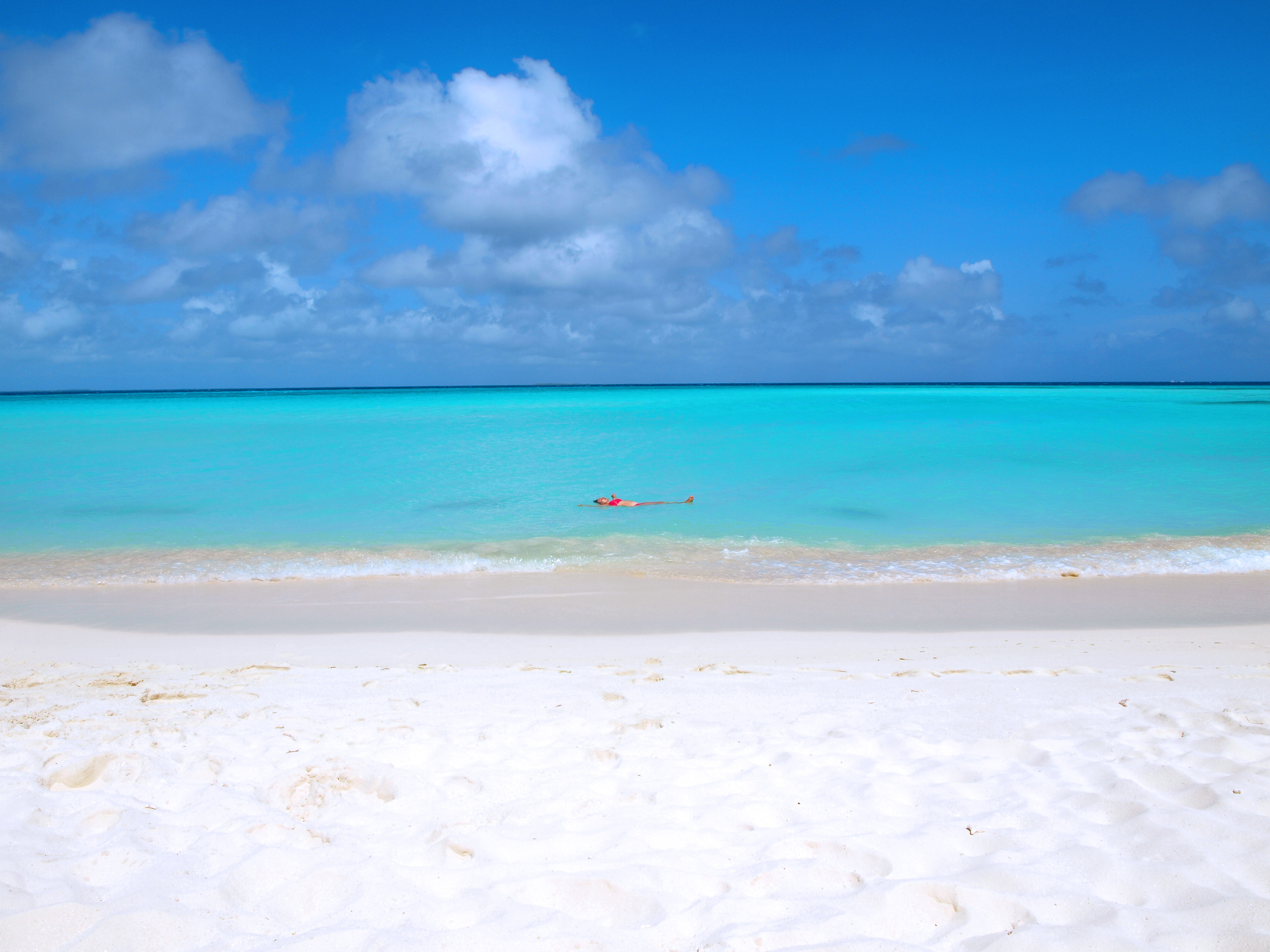
Beach in Los Roques

Tourism in Los Roques has had a significant boom in recent decades, before 1990 this territory was not exploited as a tourist destination.

Originally outsiders, wealthy Venezuelans from Caracas and foreigners, who could buy houses within the park, managed the few existing cabins. Access was restricted to light aircraft or private boats. Aerotuy was the only commercial airline operating in Los Roques at the time.

Currently there are more than 60 hostels, 50 travel agencies and six airlines all concentrated on the island of Gran Roque, which is part of the recreational sector where it is authorized to carry out this type of building.

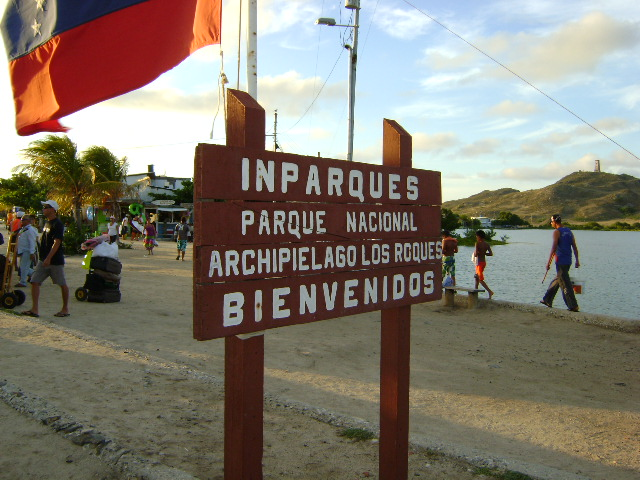
Welcome sign to the archipelago.

At the beginning of the tourist boom, 60% of the visitors were of other nationalities, most of them from the United States, Italy, Spain, Brazil, Argentina, Germany, France and the United Kingdom, however some Venezuelans also visit the park, over all those, of course, with greater purchasing power due to the high services prices.

Of all the tourists who visit Los Roques, 95% of them arrive by plane while the rest travel by boat. Staying on a sailboat is another option but it is expensive. The cheapest option is camping in the designated areas of INPARQUES. Although Los Roques has a variety of accommodation options, 96% of tourists stay in posadas, 3% in sailboats and less than 1% in camps.

For divers, the Los Roques barrier reef is one of the best preserved in the Caribbean. The warm, clear water offers excellent visibility allowing divers of all skill levels the opportunity to see the great diversity of fish species and colorful aquatic plant life, both during the day and during night dives.

Los Roques also offers several islands suitable for Windsurfing and Kitesurfing as the wind blows constantly throughout the year. In Gran Roque you can rent equipment and find guides and instructors for all activities.

=== Infrastructure ===
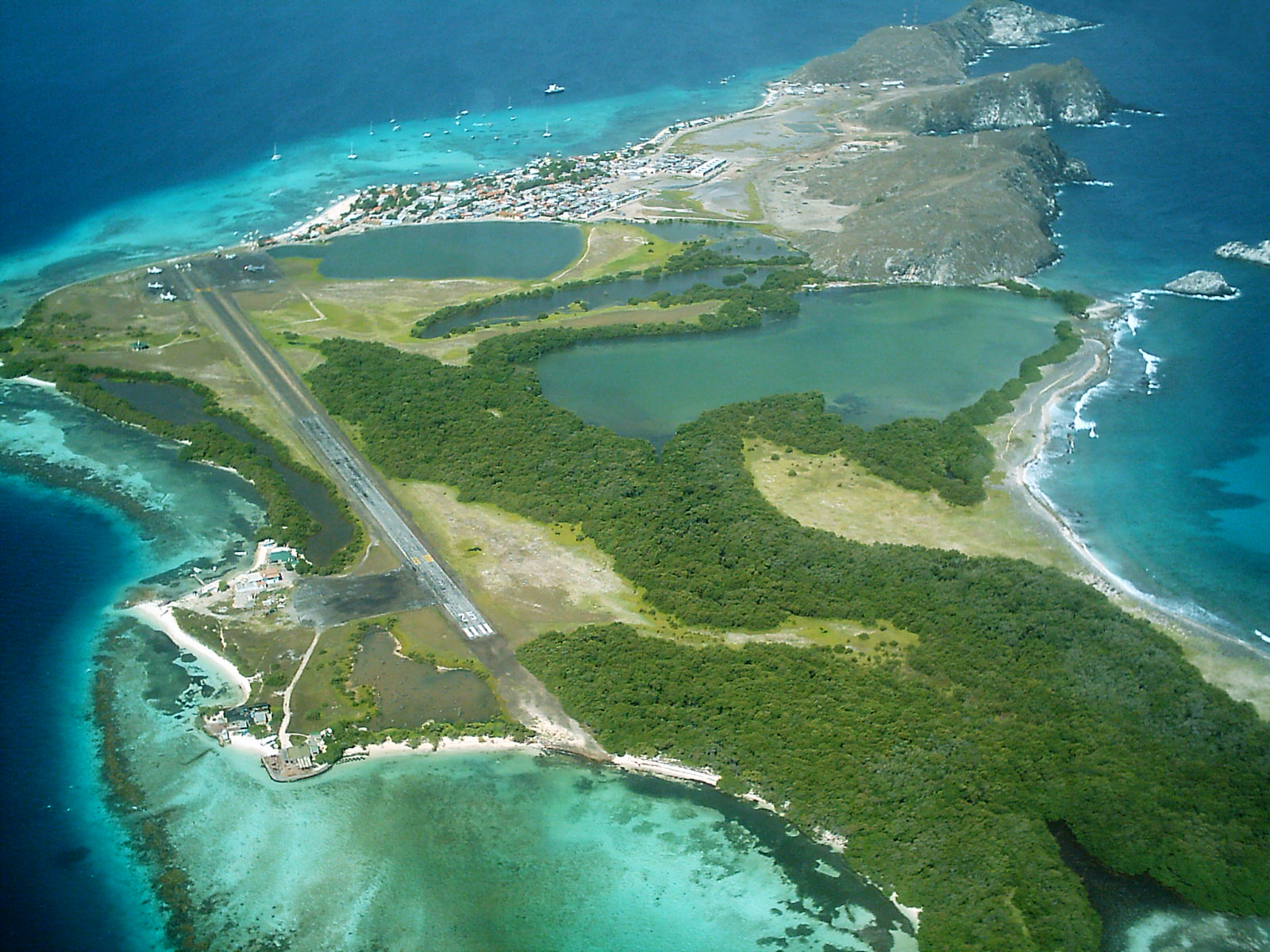
El Gran Roque Island

El Gran Roque is the only populated island in the group. It has an airport suitable for small or STOL aircraft, Los Roques Airport. The airport is controlled from the Maiquetía Airport on the mainland.

From El Gran Roque most visitors that arrive, go to the port and travel to the keys in small boats called "peñeros" from 9:00 am to 4:00 pm.

=== Attractions ===
Activities include fishing (bonefish, barracuda, tarpon, jack, and Spanish mackerel), birding, snorkeling, diving, paddling, windsurfing, and kitesurfing, and there is a sea turtle research center located on Dos Mosquises. Accommodations include Pez Raton Lodge, a property primarily used to host fishing guests, Posada Mediterraneo, a five-room inn which accommodates non-fishing guests, and dozens more like El Canto de la Ballena and Posada La Gaviota.

== See also ==
- Federal Dependencies of Venezuela
- List of marine molluscs of Venezuela
- List of national parks of Venezuela
- List of sponges of Venezuela
