= Cayos Francisquí =

Caribbean cays in Venezuela

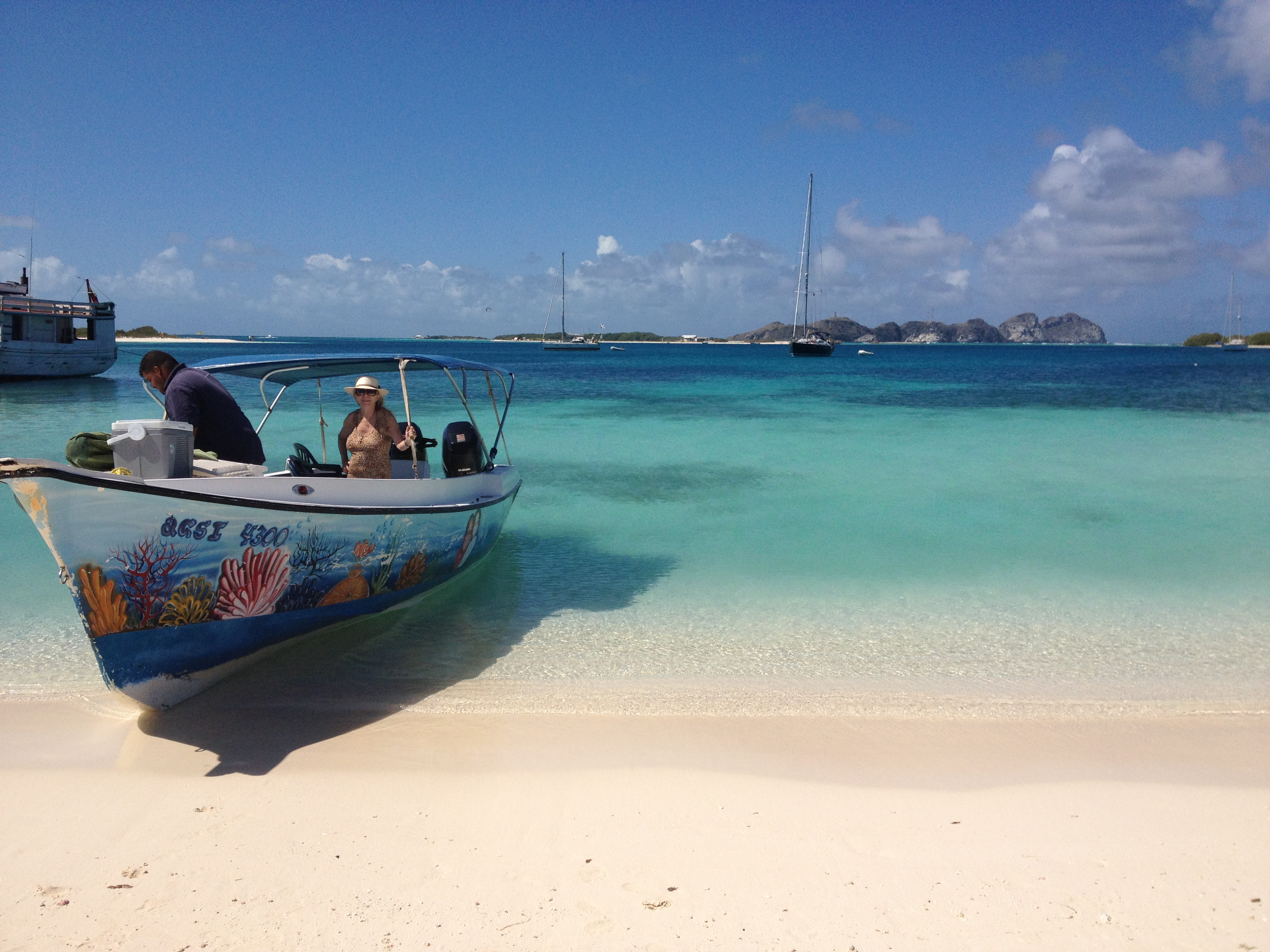
- island view

- Location within Venezuela Location within the Caribbean

Geography
- Location: Caribbean Sea
- Coordinates: 11°58′N 66°39′W

Administration
- Venezuela
- Federal dependencies of Venezuela

The Cayos Francisquí also known as Cayos Franciskí (Franciskí Keys), is the name of a group of Caribbean cays that form part of the Los Roques Archipelago National Park in northern Venezuela. Administratively, as part of the Los Roques Archipelago, they belong to the Francisco de Miranda Island Territory.

== Location ==
They are located in the Venezuelan Caribbean, north of Caracas, west of the Cayo Nordisquí and northeast of Gran Roque Island, at the northern end of the Los Roques Archipelago National Park.

== Member islands ==
These are three nearby keys of coral origin:

- Francisquí de Abajo
- Francisquí del Medio
- Francisquí de Arriba

== Tourism ==
Due to their proximity to Gran Roque they have become a popular tourist destination, being one of the major attractions of the archipelago with its white sand beaches and a natural swimming pool. Diving, snorkeling and kitesurfing are practiced.

== Gallery ==
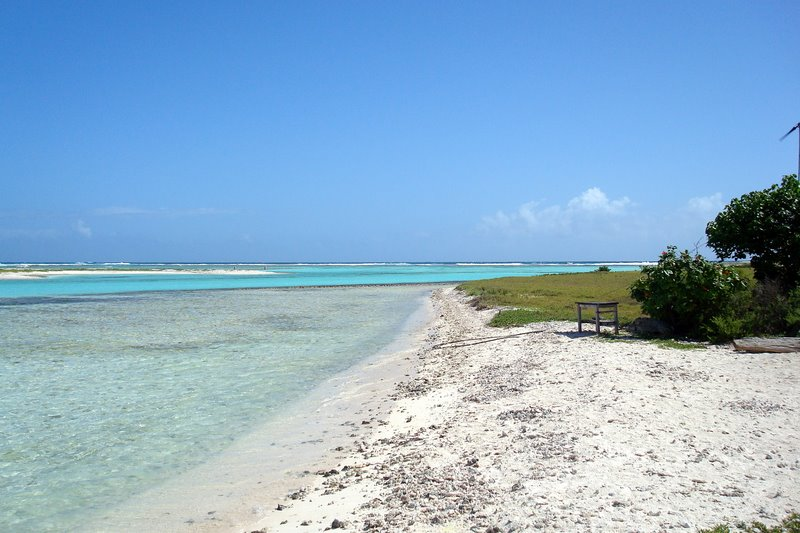

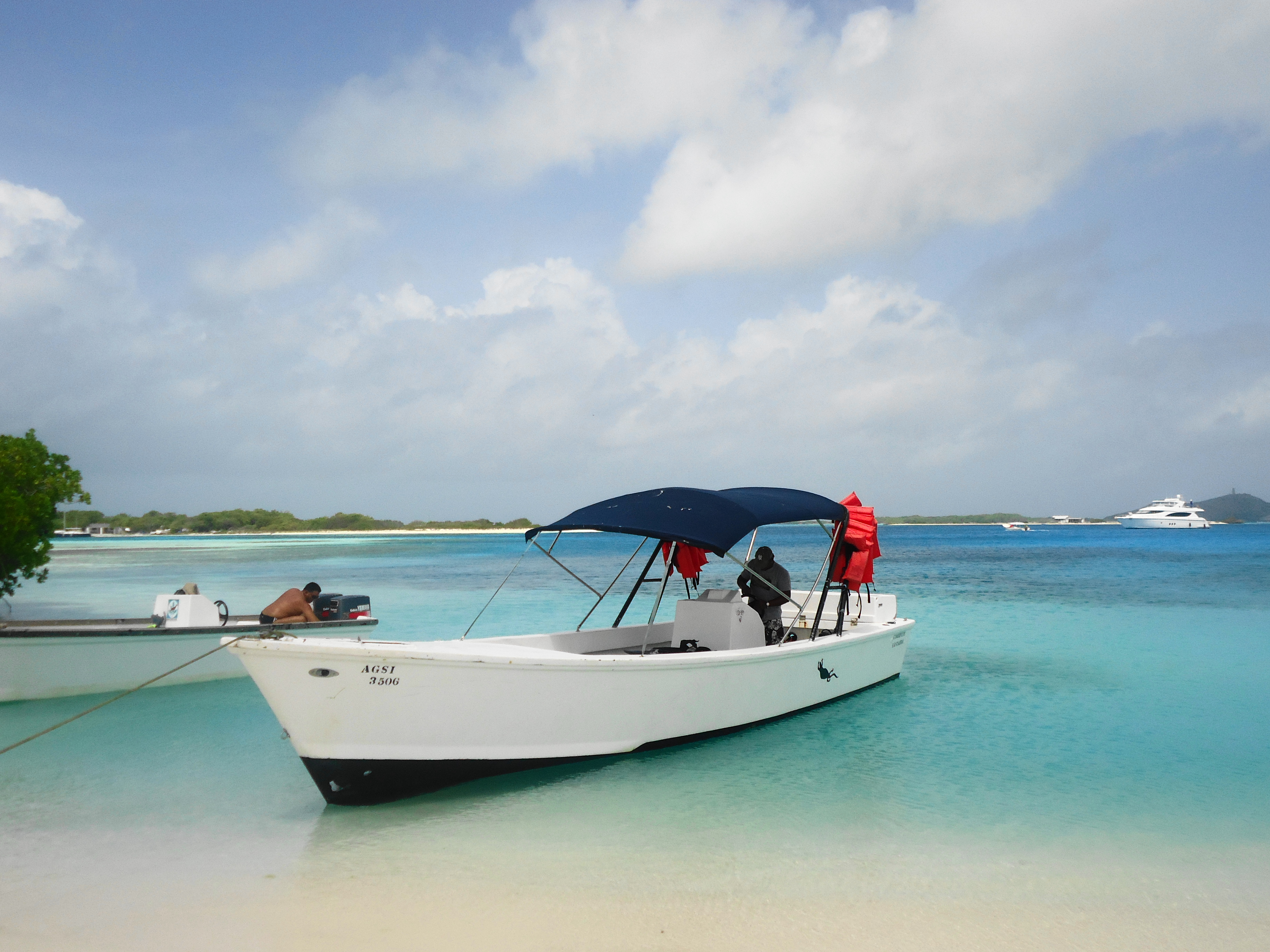

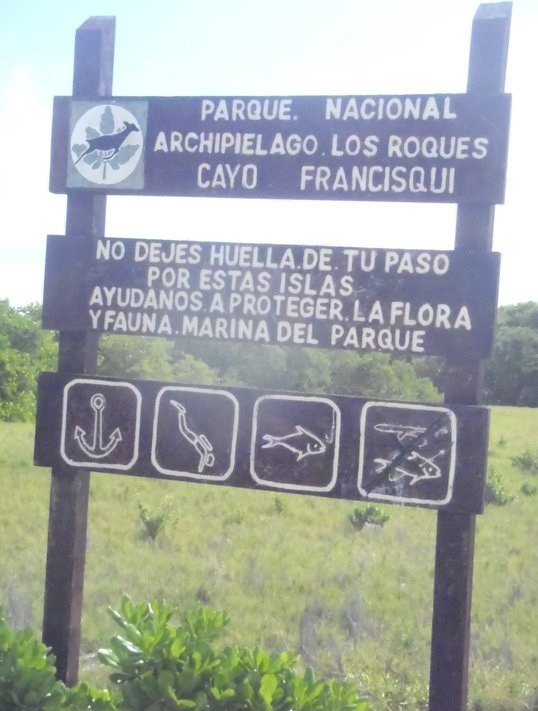

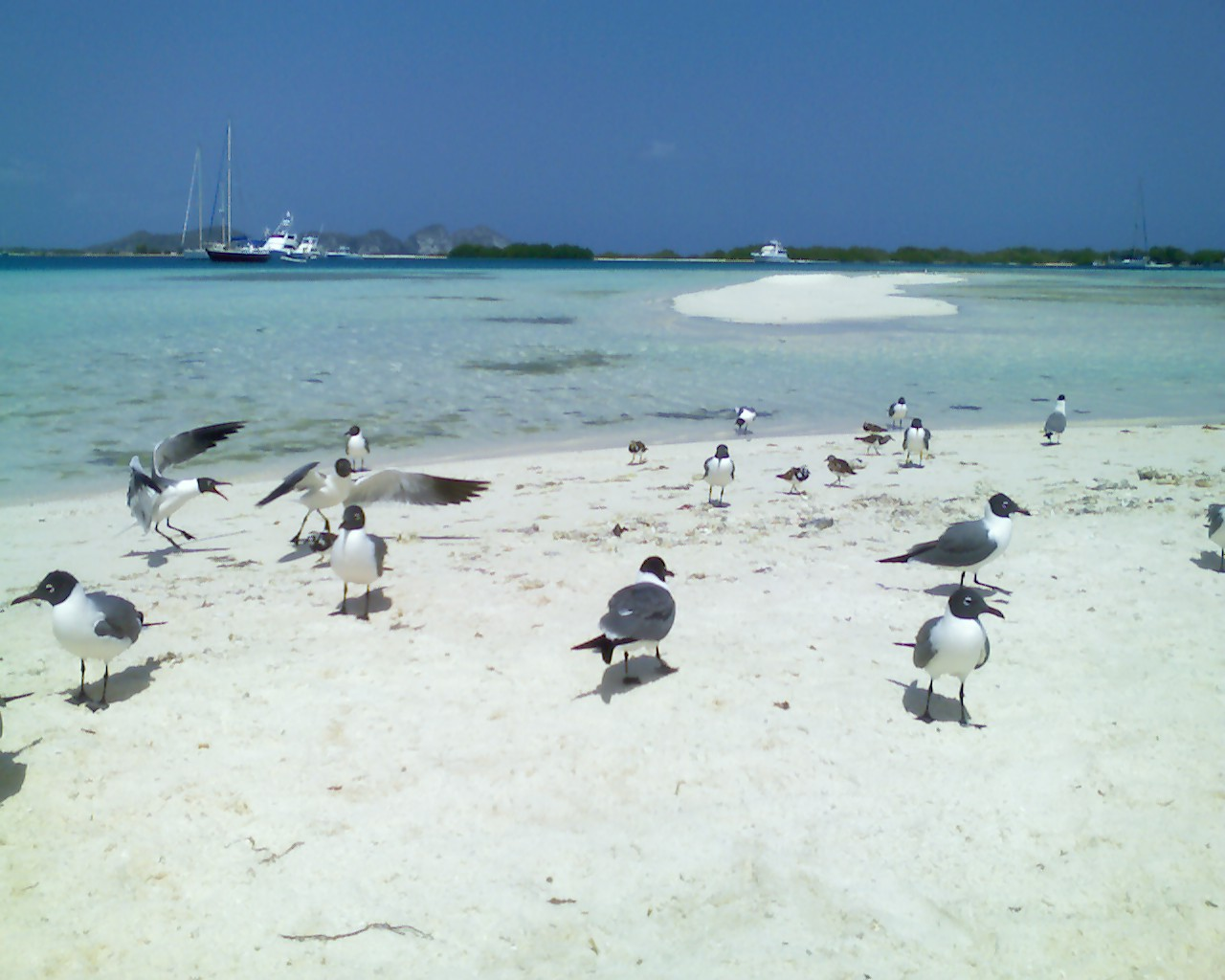

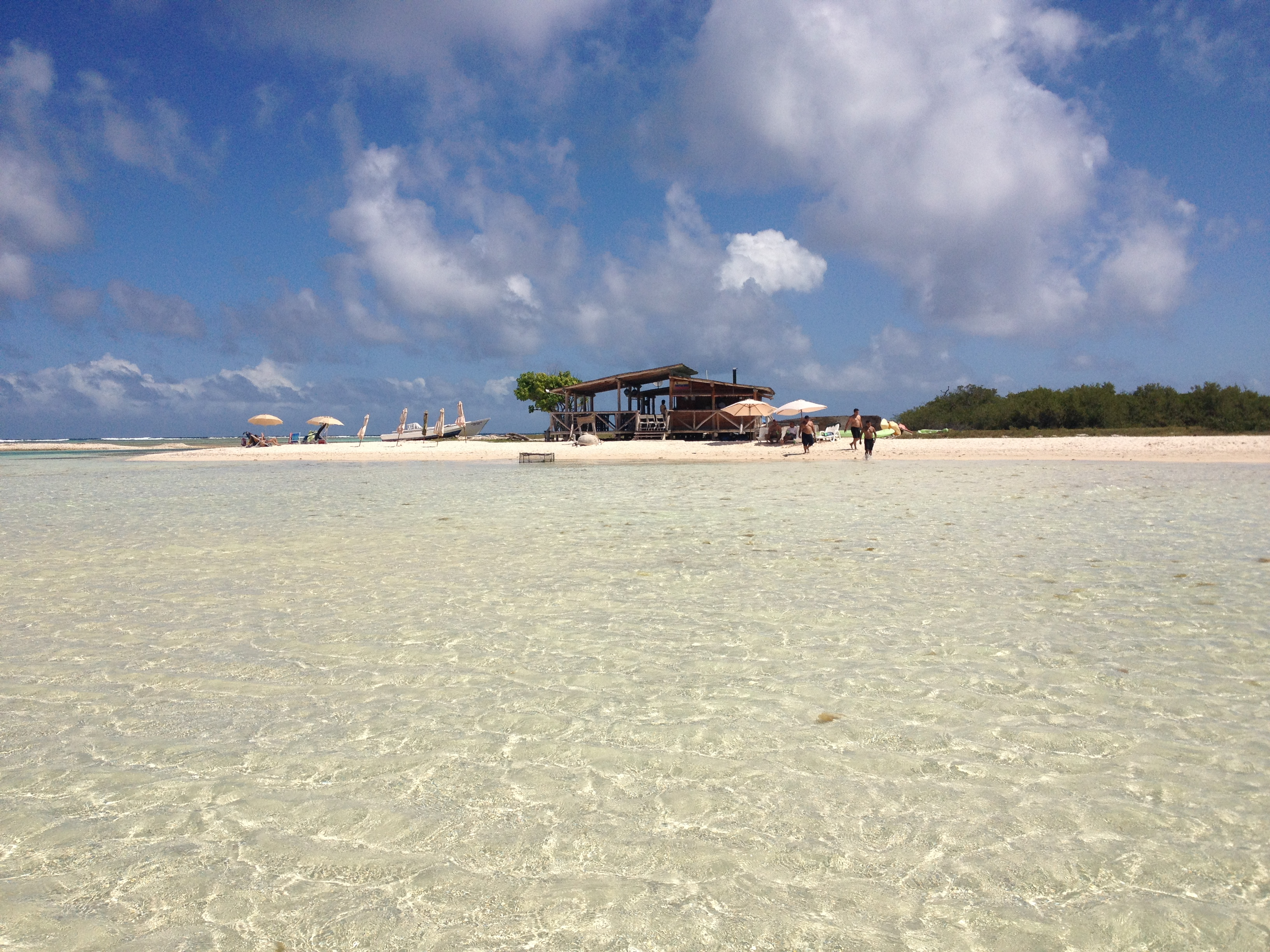

== See also ==
- Geography of Venezuela
