= Cayo de Agua =

Island in the eastern Caribbean Sea

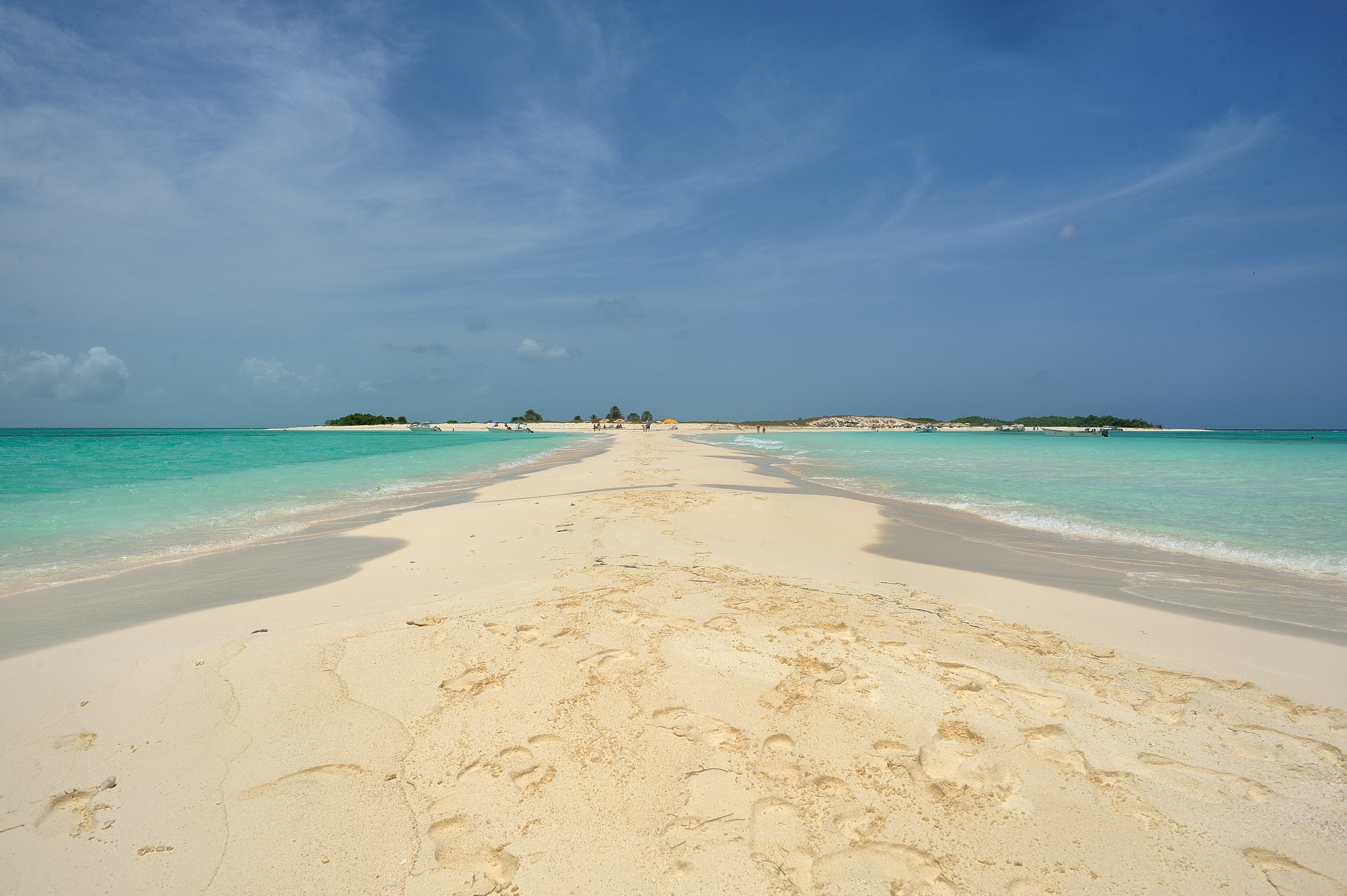
- Cayo de Agua Island

- Location within Venezuela Location within the Caribbean

Geography
- Location: Lesser Antilles; Caribbean Sea
- Coordinates: 11°49′33″N 66°56′34″W
- Archipelago: Los Roques
- Area: 0.69 km^{2} (0.27 sq mi)
- Length: 8.3 km (5.16 mi)
- Highest elevation: 6 m (20 ft)

Administration
- Venezuela
- Federal Entity: Federal dependencies of Venezuela

Cayo de Agua (lit. Water Key) is the name of an island in the eastern Caribbean Sea that geographically belongs to the Los Roques Archipelago and is administratively organized as part of the Federal Dependencies, Venezuela, in addition to being part of the National Park of the same name and the Miranda Island Territory, the name of this key has its origin in the fact that it has freshwater wells within it.

== Location ==
It is located to the north of Venezuela, in the extreme west of the National Park "Los Roques", by the north they limit with the keys of Puntas de Cocos, Pelona de Cayo de Agua, Bequevé and Selesquí, and by the southeast they are the cayos Dos Mosquises. Cayo de Agua is located relatively far from the aerodrome or airport of Los Roques located at the opposite end (west) of the archipelago on the island of Gran Roque.

== Tourism ==
Cayo de Agua is popular within the archipelago thanks to the beauty of its white sands and solitary beaches, the birds that can be found in its surroundings and the fact that it forms with other neighboring keys a small natural swimming pool, there are also freshwater wells, one of the most practiced activities is diving.

== Gallery ==
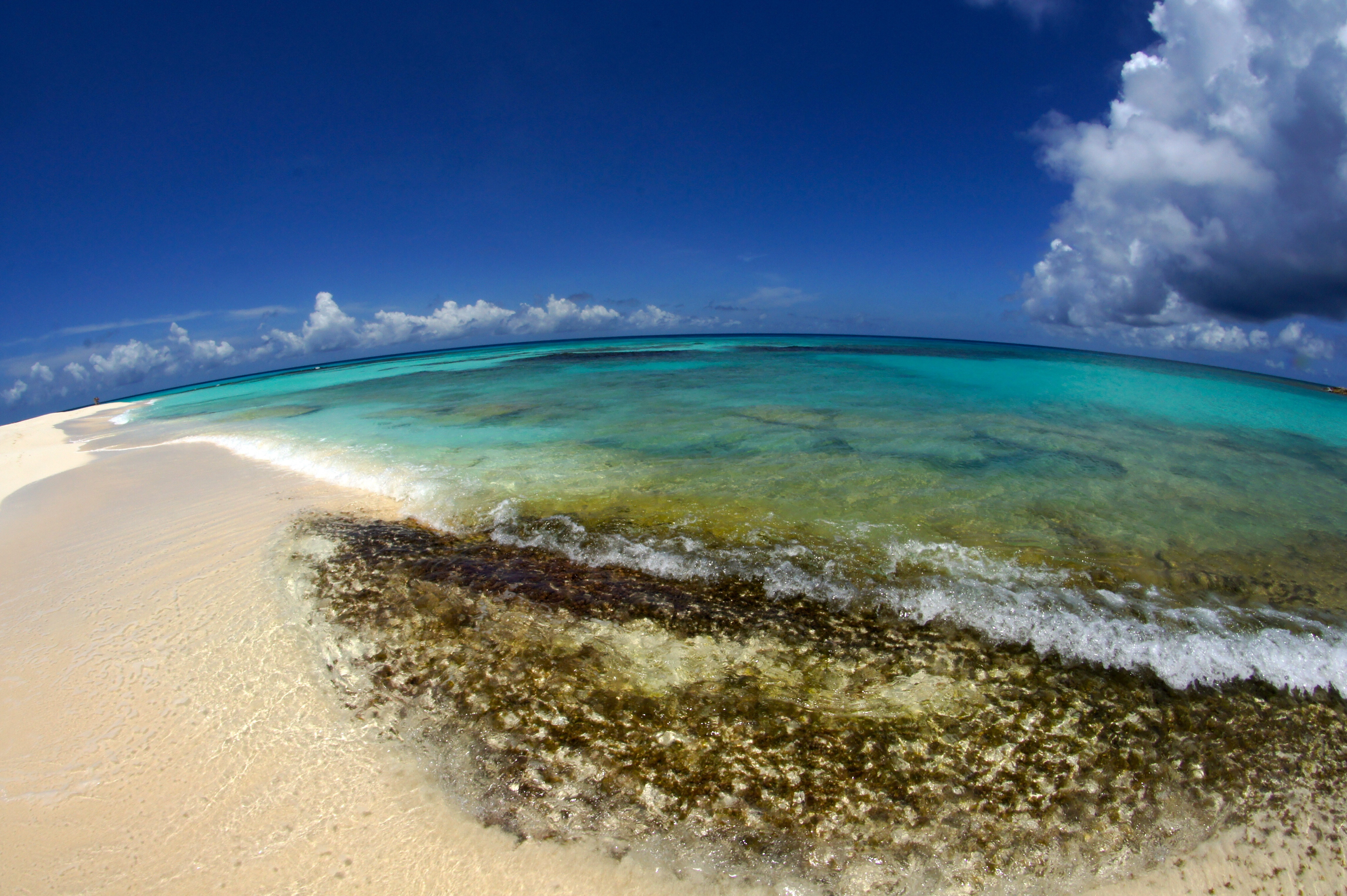

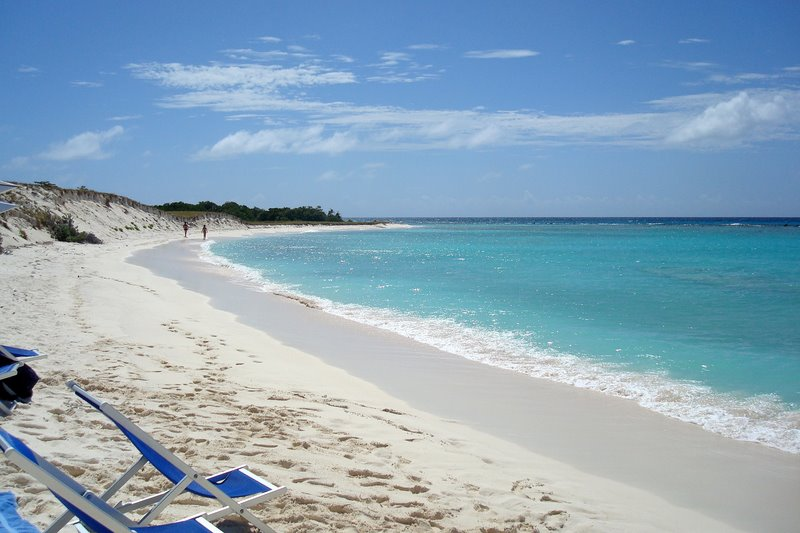

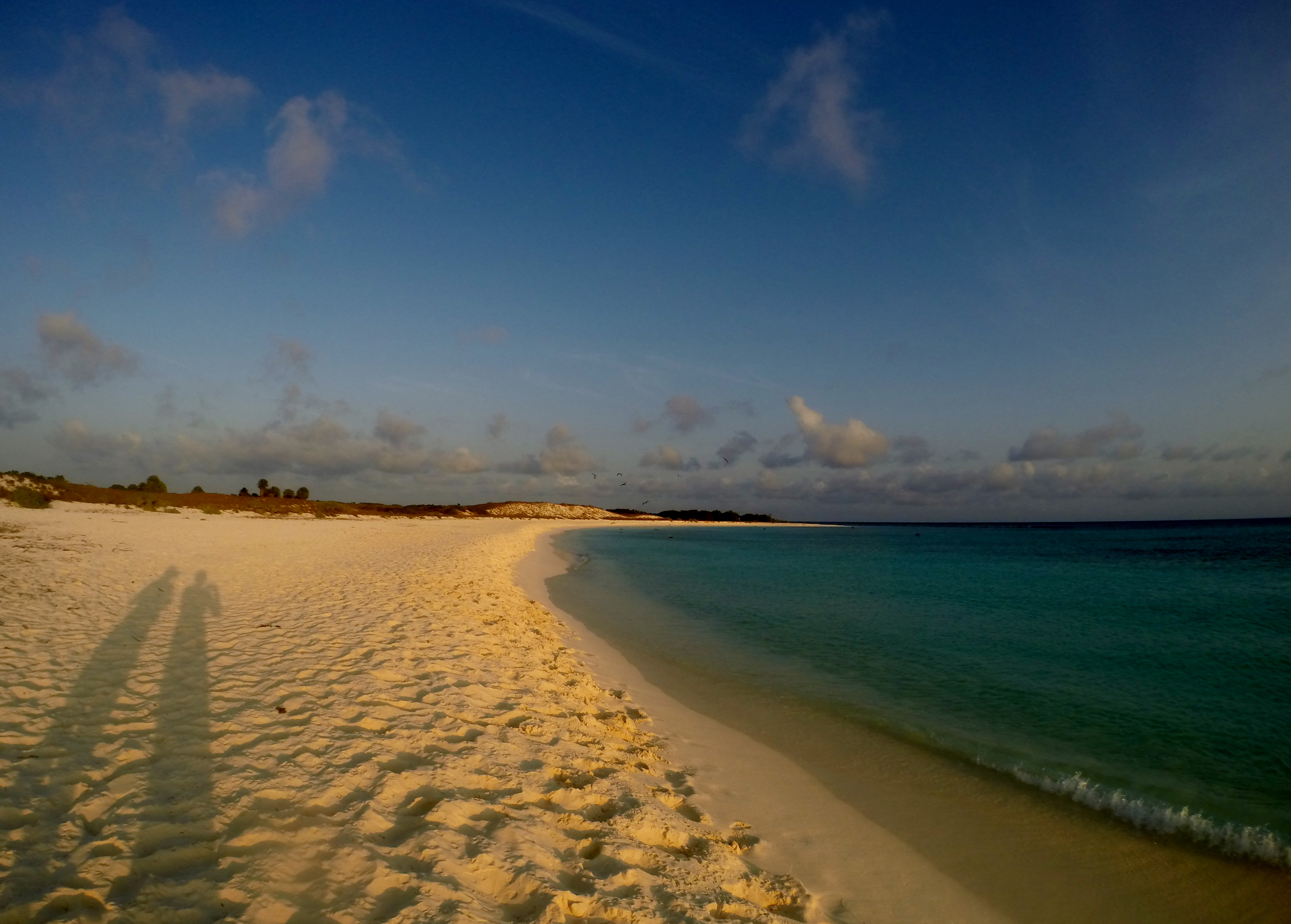

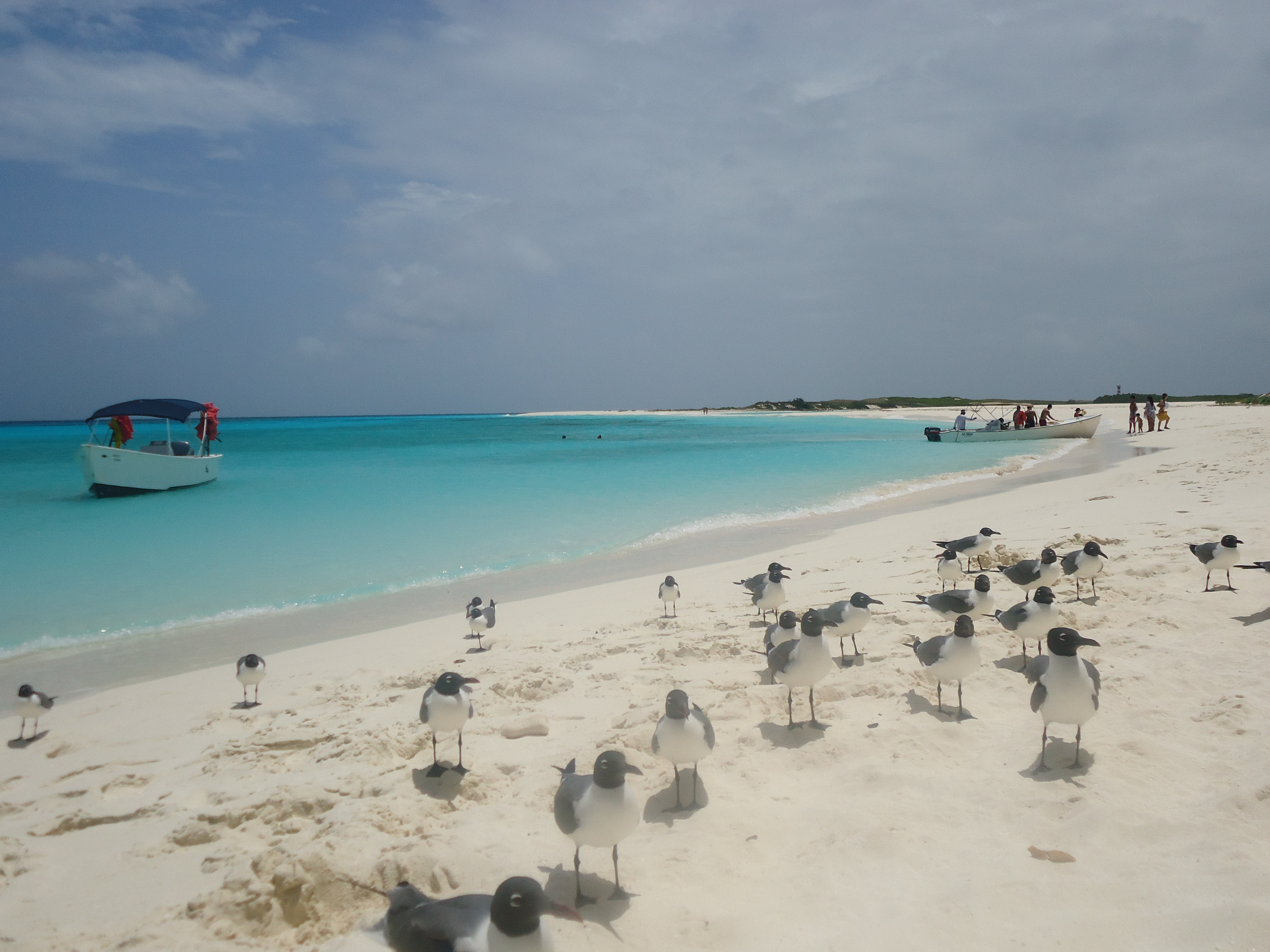

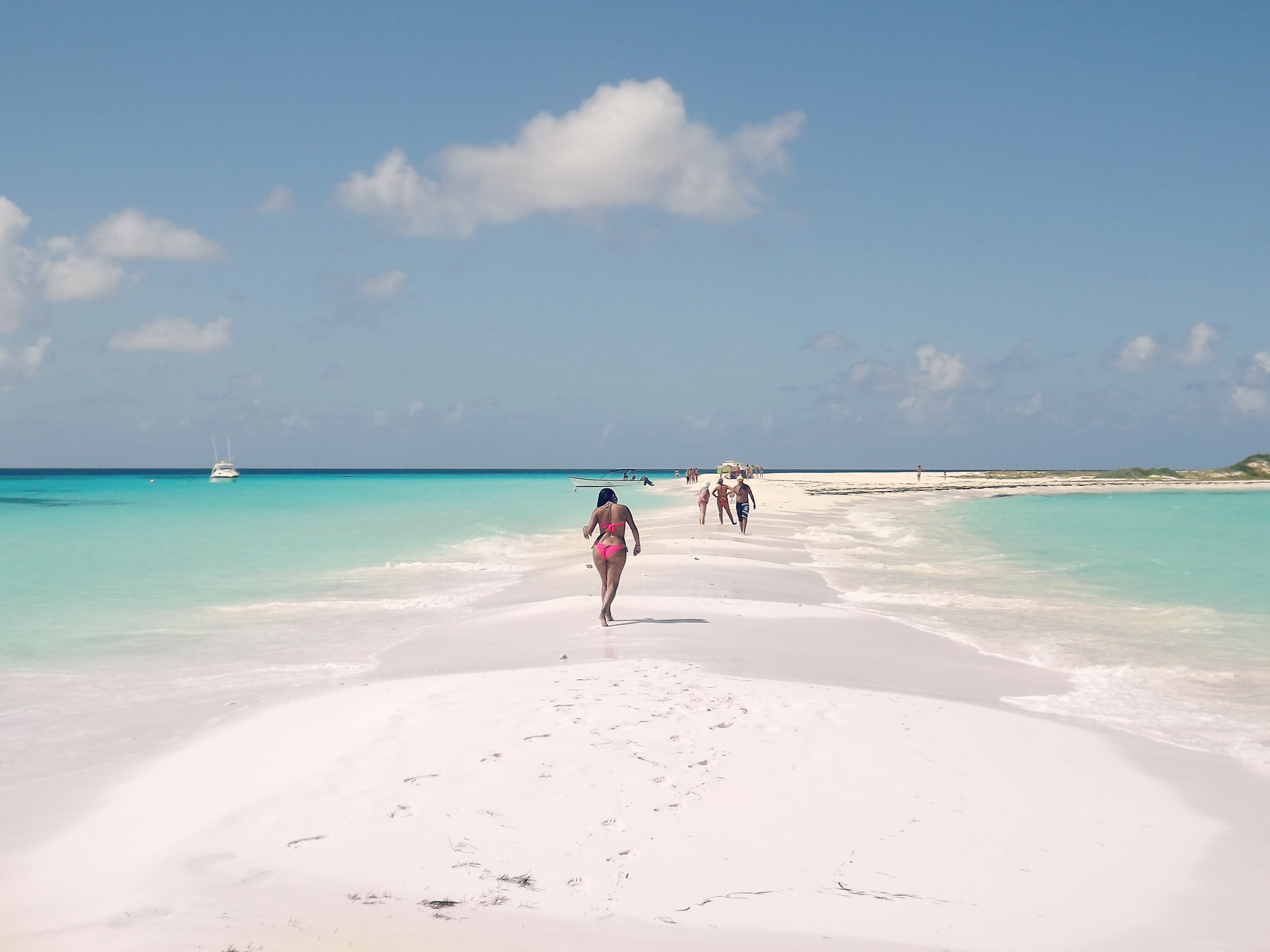

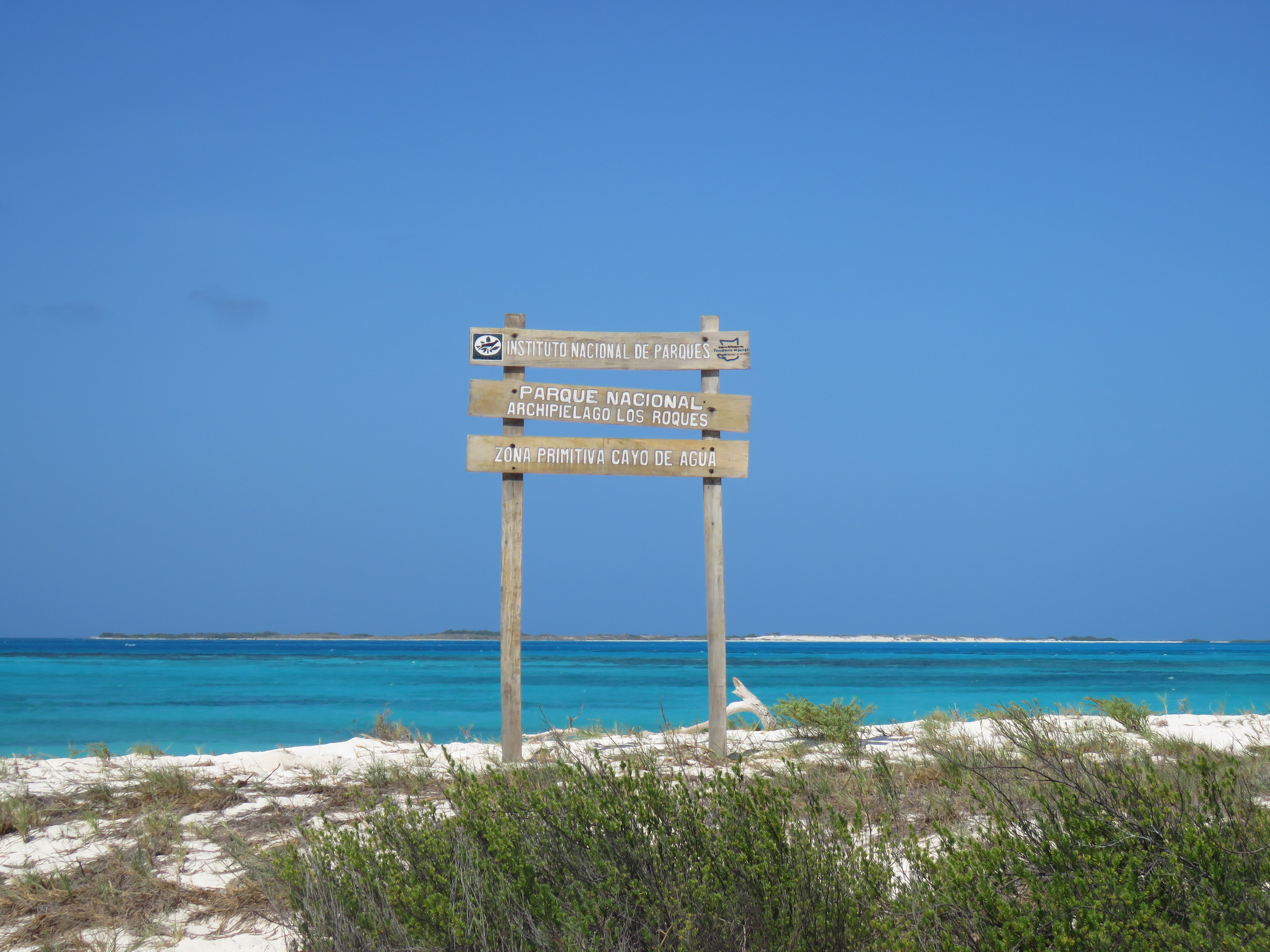

== See also ==
- Gran Roque
- Cayos Francisquí
