= List of travelers =

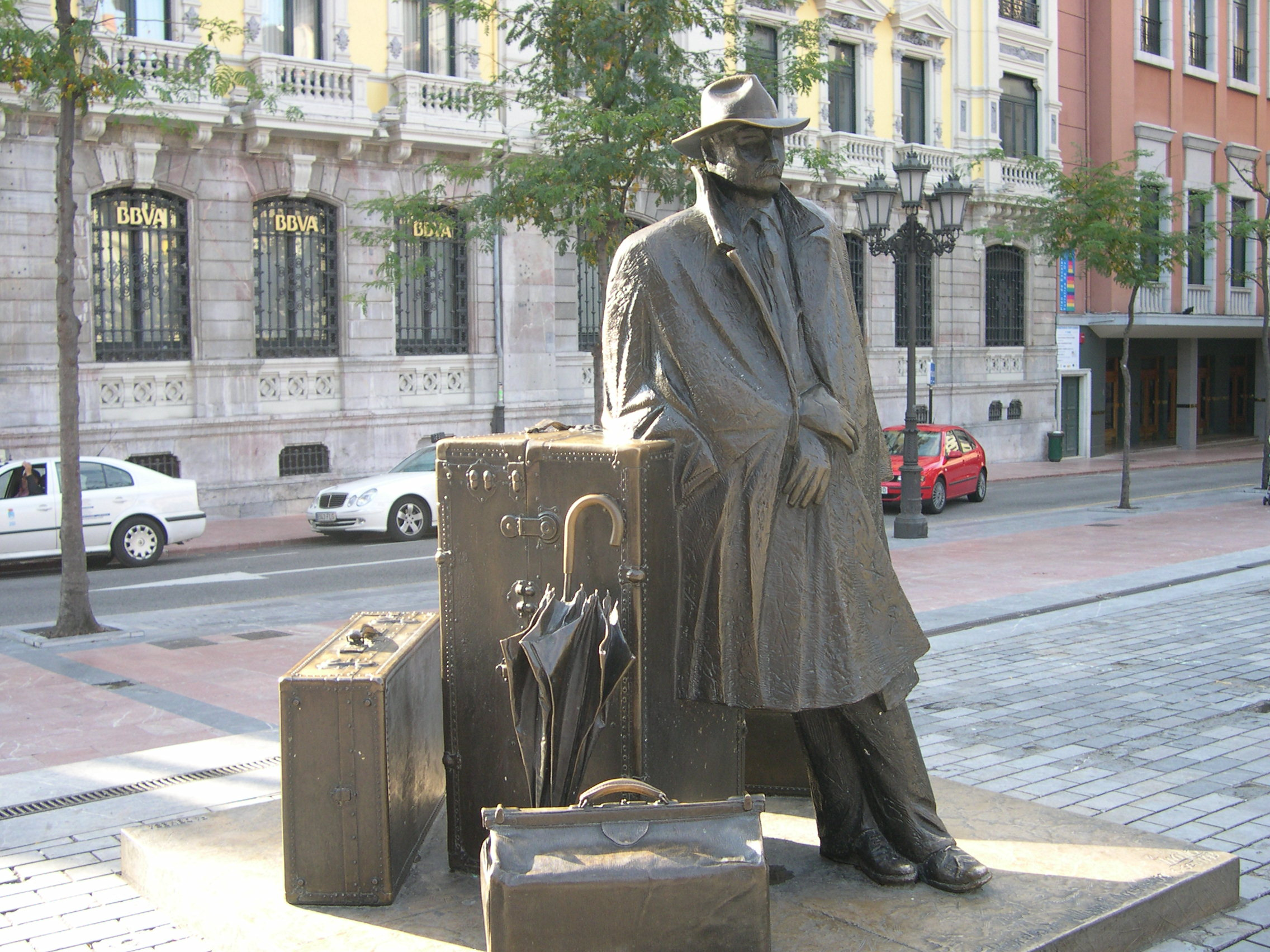
A statue dedicated to the traveler in Oviedo, Spain.

This is a list of people noteworthy for their travels or explorations. Travel is the movement of people between relatively distant geographical locations, and can involve travel by foot, bicycle, automobile, train, boat, airplane, or other means and can be one way or round trip. Travel can also include relatively short stays between successive movements.

== Travelers ==
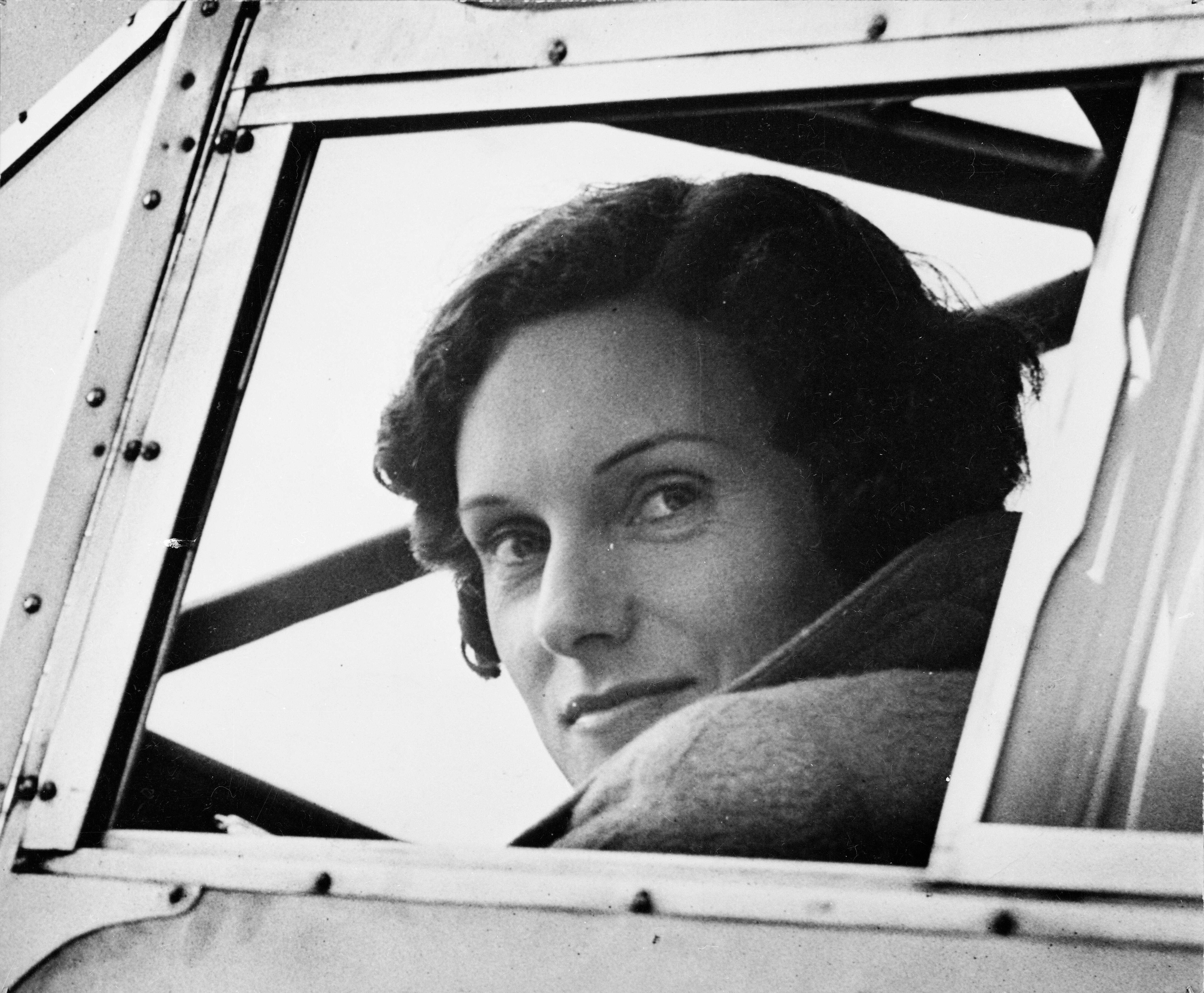
New Zealand aviator Jean Batten in 1937

- Bodhisena – Tamil Indian Buddhist scholar and monk who traveled to Japan and established the Kegon school. He first went to China, and later he traveled to Japan via Cambodia and Vietnam.
- Guru Nanak Sahib – the founder of Sikh faith, who was born in the northern part of undivided India in 1469 ad. travelled across all of South Asia (India, Nepal, Sri Lanka, Afghanistan), China and Middle East (Mecca, Iraq, Turkey). He even visited Vatican City (Rome). His goal was to spread the message of peace. He is believed to have received a word directly from God in 1499 after which he embarked on these journeys. He is believed to have travelled more than 28,000 km in five major tours of the world during the period from 1500 to 1524.
- Tania Aebi – completed a solo circumnavigation of the Earth in a 26-foot sailboat between the ages of 18 and 21, starting in May 1985, making her the first American woman and the youngest person (at the time) to sail around the world.
- Dominick Arduin – a Frenchwoman who disappeared in her attempt to ski to the North Pole.
- Abu Salim al-Ayyashi – (1628–1679) was a well-known travel writer, poet and scholar from Morocco. He wrote a two volume rihla about his journeys: Ma al-Mawaid (Table Water).
- Francis Arundell – toured in exploration of Asia Minor in March to September 1826, and ventured again in 1833 upon another tour of 1,000 miles through districts the greater part of which had hitherto not been described by any European traveller, when he made an especial study of the ruins of Antioch in Pisidia. Two volumes describing these discoveries were published in 1834.
- Jean Batten – became the best-known New Zealander of the 1930s, internationally, by making a number of record-breaking solo flights across the world. She made the first-ever solo flight from England to New Zealand in 1936.
- Ibn Battuta – a medieval Moroccan Muslim traveler and scholar, who is widely recognised as one of the greatest travelers of all time. He is known for his extensive travels, accounts of which were published in The Rihla (lit. "Journey").
  - List of places visited by Ibn Battuta
- Jeanne Baré – recognized as the first woman to have completed a voyage of circumnavigation of the globe.

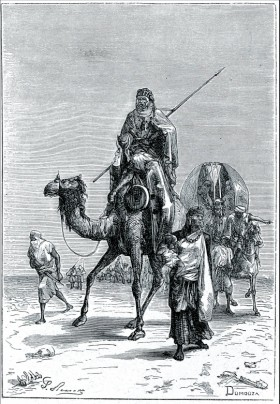
Benjamin of Tudela in the Sahara (Author : Dumouza, 19th-century engraving)

- Benjamin of Tudela – a medieval Jewish traveler who visited Europe, Asia, and Africa in the 12th century. His vivid descriptions of western Asia preceded those of Marco Polo by a hundred years. With his broad education and vast knowledge of languages, Benjamin of Tudela is a major figure in medieval geography and Jewish history.
- Nancy Bird Walton – a pioneering Australian aviator, and was the founder and patron of the Australian Women Pilots' Association
- Nellie Bly – widely known for her record-breaking trip around the world in 72 days
- Giacomo Casanova - Italian adventurer and author.
- Renata Chlumska – an adventurer and mountain climber with dual Swedish and Czech citizenship, she became the first Swedish and Czech woman to climb Mount Everest.
- William Eleroy Curtis – an American journalist and diplomat who promoted Pan-Americanism, publishing many popular novels and articles with his observations of South America, Asia, and Europe.
- Zechariah Dhahiri – wrote extensively about his travels and experiences in many travel places, publishing them in a book which he called, Sefer Ha-Mūsar (The Book of Moral Instruction).
- Eva Dickson – a Swedish explorer, rally driver, aviator and travel writer. She was the first woman to have crossed the Sahara desert by car.
- Amelia Earhart – first woman to cross the Atlantic Ocean by airplane.
- Walter Evans-Wentz – American anthropologist who traveled to India and Tibet, and translated the Bardo Thodol.
- Rose de Freycinet – a Frenchwoman who, in the company of her husband, Louis de Freycinet, sailed around the world between 1817 and 1820 on a French scientific expedition on a military ship, initially disguised as a man.
- Isabel Godin des Odonais – an 18th-century Spanish woman who became separated from her French husband in South America by colonial politics, and was not reunited with him until more than 20 years later. Her long journey, from western Peru to the mouth of the Amazon River, is without equal in the history of South America.
- Guido Guerrini – first person to go from Europe to China covering the whole route by a gas-fuelled car.
- Susan Hale – an American author, traveler and artist
- Grace Marguerite Hay Drummond-Hay – a British journalist who was the first woman to travel around the world by air, in a Zeppelin.
- Margaretha Heijkenskjöld – a Swedish traveler and a dress reformer. She attracted a lot of attention from her contemporaries by her journeys.
- Lucia Ruggles Holman - American teacher and letter writer; last survivor of the first missionary company to the Sandwich Islands; first American woman to sail around the world.
- Gunther Holtorf – a German traveler who, often in company of his wife Christine, journeyed across the world in his G-Wagen Mercedes-Benz named "Otto", visiting 179 countries in 26 years.
- Giorgio Interiano – a Genovese traveler, historian and ethnographer. His travelogue La vita: & sito de Zichi, chiamiti ciarcassi: historia notabile was among the first European accounts of the life and customs of the Circassian people.
- Martin and Osa Johnson – American adventurers and documentary filmmakers
- Prince Bojidar Karageorgevitch – a Serbian artist and writer on art, world traveller, and member of the Serbian Karađorđević dynasty
- Alma Maximiliana Karlin – an Austro-Hungarian – Yugoslavian (now Slovene) traveler from Celje, writer, poet, ethnographer, collector, polyglot and theosophist who travelled the world for 8 years. She started her travel in 24 November 1919 and finished it in January 1928, earning all the money by herself while traveling, by publishing travelogues in newspapers, publishing numerous books (might be more than 22 books published altogether), teaching languages to people, traducing and so on. She mastered 10 languages and she obtained a degree of excellence from 8 foreign languages at Society of Arts in London. She wrote her own dictionary of 10 languages which helped her on her travel around the world.
- Aleko Konstantinov – a cosmopolitan traveler, was the first Bulgarian to write about his visits to Western Europe and America. His visits to the World Exhibitions of Exposition Universelle (1889) in Paris, General Land Centennial Exhibition (1891) in Prague and World Columbian Exposition in Chicago in 1893 – including a visit to Niagara Falls – provided Bulgarian readers, who had recently gained independence from nearly 500 years of oppression by the Ottoman Empire, with a portrait of the developed world.
- Waclaw Korabiewicz – a Polish reporter, poet, traveler, and collector of ethnographic exhibits
- Vyacheslav Krasko – a Russian traveler, manager and professional financier with a PhD Economics. Krasko is a member of the Union of the Russian Around-the-World Travelers.
- Santhosh George Kulangara - an Indian professional traveller known for producing, directing, editing, shooting, and broadcasting his journeys through Safari TV, a channel for travel and history-based programs. His programme Sancharam, the first travel documentary in Malayalam, has broadcast over 1900 episodes.
- Lyuba Kutincheva (1910–1998), a female Bulgarian traveler and polyglot who traveled for almost a decade (1929–1938) through the Middle East, Far East, northern Africa and Europe.
- Rom Landau – Polish writer who traveled in the Middle East and North Africa
- Therese von Lützow
- Vladimir Lysenko – Between September 1997 and 2002, Lysenko crossed 62 countries by car. He crossed each continent (other than Antarctica) twice, traveling between the most distant points of each continent in both latitude and longitude.
- John Maley – American explorer and travel writer who explored the Trans-Mississippi in the early 19th century
- Niccolao Manucci – Venetian traveler, writer, and physician

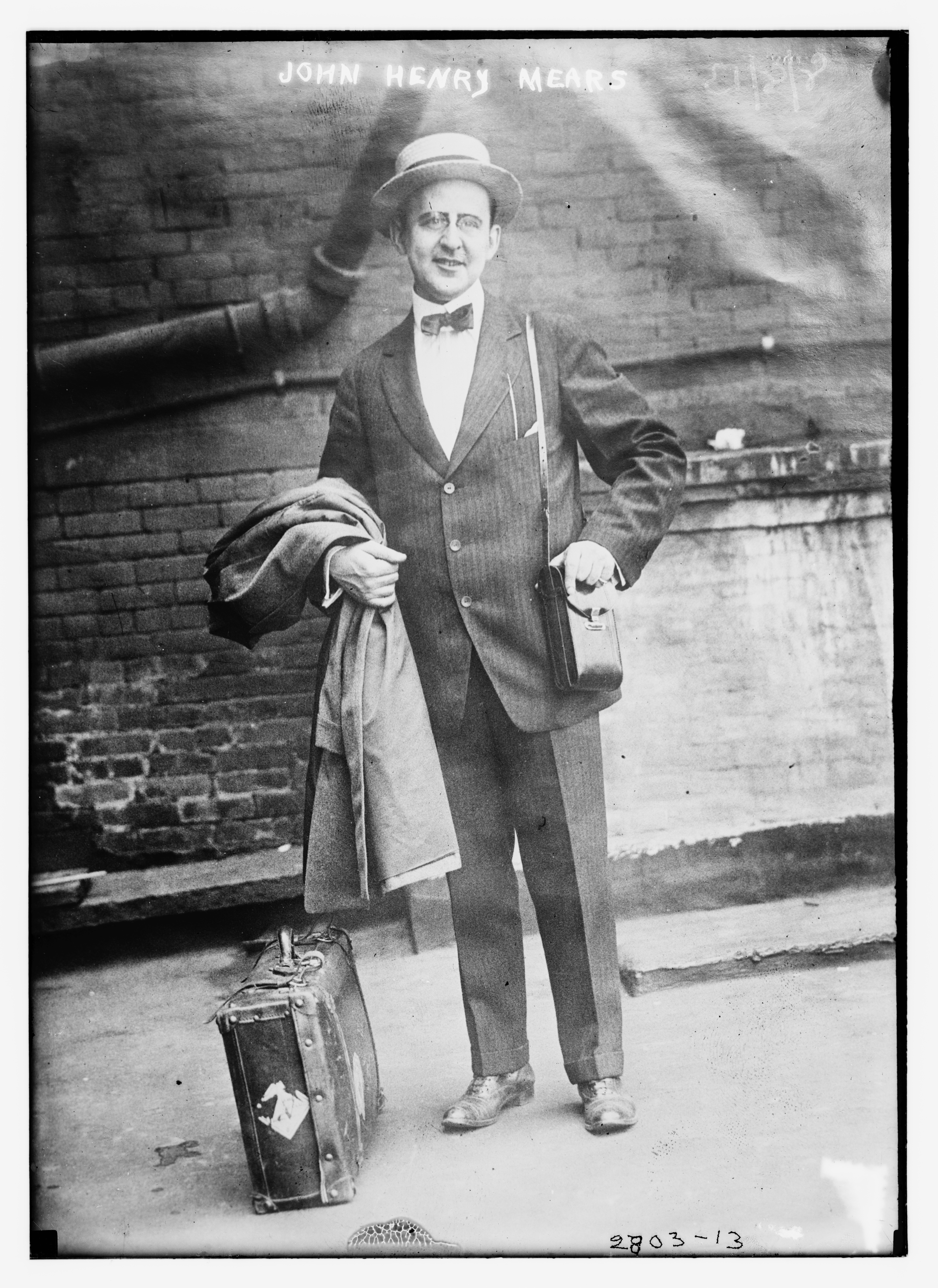
John Henry Mears between ca. 1910 and ca. 1915

- John Henry Mears – set the record for the fastest trip around the world both in 1913 and 1928. He was also a Broadway producer. On 2 July 1913, he left New York City on the RMS Mauretania, then traveled by a combination of steamers, yachts, and trains to circumnavigate the Earth and reach New York City again on 6 August 1913. He had an elapsed time of 35 days, 21 hours, 35 minutes, 18 and four-fifths seconds.
- Russell Hastings Millward – travelled on foot through Mexico and Central America.
- Peter Mundy – a seventeenth-century British merchant trader, traveller and writer. He was the first Briton to record, in his Itinerarium Mundi ('Itinerary of the World'), tasting Chaa (tea) in China and travelled extensively in Asia, Russia and Europe.
- Ida Laura Pfeiffer – Austrian explorer, travel writer, and ethnographer. She was one of the first female travelers and her bestselling journals were translated into seven languages.
- Niccolò and Maffeo Polo – Italian traveling merchants who engaged in two voyages
- Marco Polo – son of Niccolo Polo, Italian merchant who
- Jovan Rajić – a Serbian writer, historian, traveller, and pedagogue
- Matas Šalčius – a Lithuanian traveler, journalist, writer and political figure
- Rahul Sankrityayan – a known polymath and polyglot who travelled different parts of the world. He wrote over 100 books on different subjects and had knowledge of about 35 languages.
- Jacob Saphir – a Meshulach and traveler of Romanian Jewish descent
- Annemarie Schwarzenbach – a Swiss writer, journalist, photographer and traveler
- Emilia Serrano y García - Spanish traveler through Latin America
- Sam Sloan – a chess organizer and player who has visited 78 countries in his work
- Lady Hester Stanhope – a British socialite, adventurer and traveler. Her archaeological expedition to Ashkelon in 1815 is considered the first modern excavation in the history of Holy Land archeology.

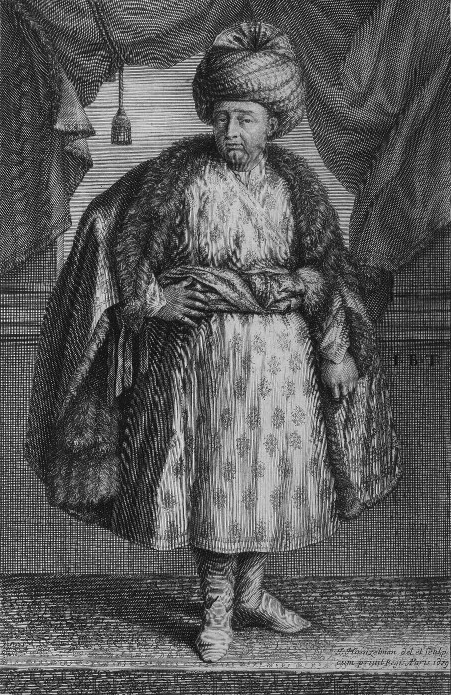
Jean-Baptiste Tavernier in oriental costume, 1679

- Rick Steves – travel writer
- Audrey Sutherland - American traveler, kayaker, teacher, and author
- Jean-Baptiste Tavernier – a 17th-century French gem merchant and traveler.
- Marten Douwes Teenstra – (17 September 1795 – 29 October 1864) Dutch writer and traveller in South Africa and the Dutch East Indies. The account of his stay at the Cape from 12 March to 7 July 1825, De vruchten mijner werkzaamheden (fruits of my labours), was a thorough description of his trip, rich in interesting detail of the personalities and places he came across, and thoughtful commentary on the social, political and economic life of the Cape colony.
- Barbara Toy – most famous for the series of books she wrote about her pioneering and solitary travels around the world in a Land Rover, undertaken in the 1950s and 1960s.
- Mark Twain – author
- Ikechi Uko – organizer of Akwaaba African Travel Market, the first international travel fair in West Africa
- Wiebe Wakker – holds the world record for completing the longest ever electric car trip in the world covering a distance of about 95,000 km and visiting 33 countries.
- Xuanzang - 7th-century Chinese monk who made a seventeen year overland journey to India, returning to China with a caravan of Buddhist texts and later wrote an influential and historically significant record of his travels.

Japanese painting of Xuanzang

- Ziryab – a singer, oud player, composer, poet, and teacher who lived and worked in Iraq, North Africa, and Al-Andalus during the medieval Islamic period.
- Xu Xiake
- Lei Diansheng

== See also ==
- List of explorers
- List of female explorers and travelers
- List of space travelers by name
- List of space travelers by nationality
- Mughal travelers
