= National Museum of Ethnography =

National ethnographic museum in Warsaw, Poland

Coordinates: 52°14′17″N 21°0′44″E

- Państwowe Muzeum Etnograficzne
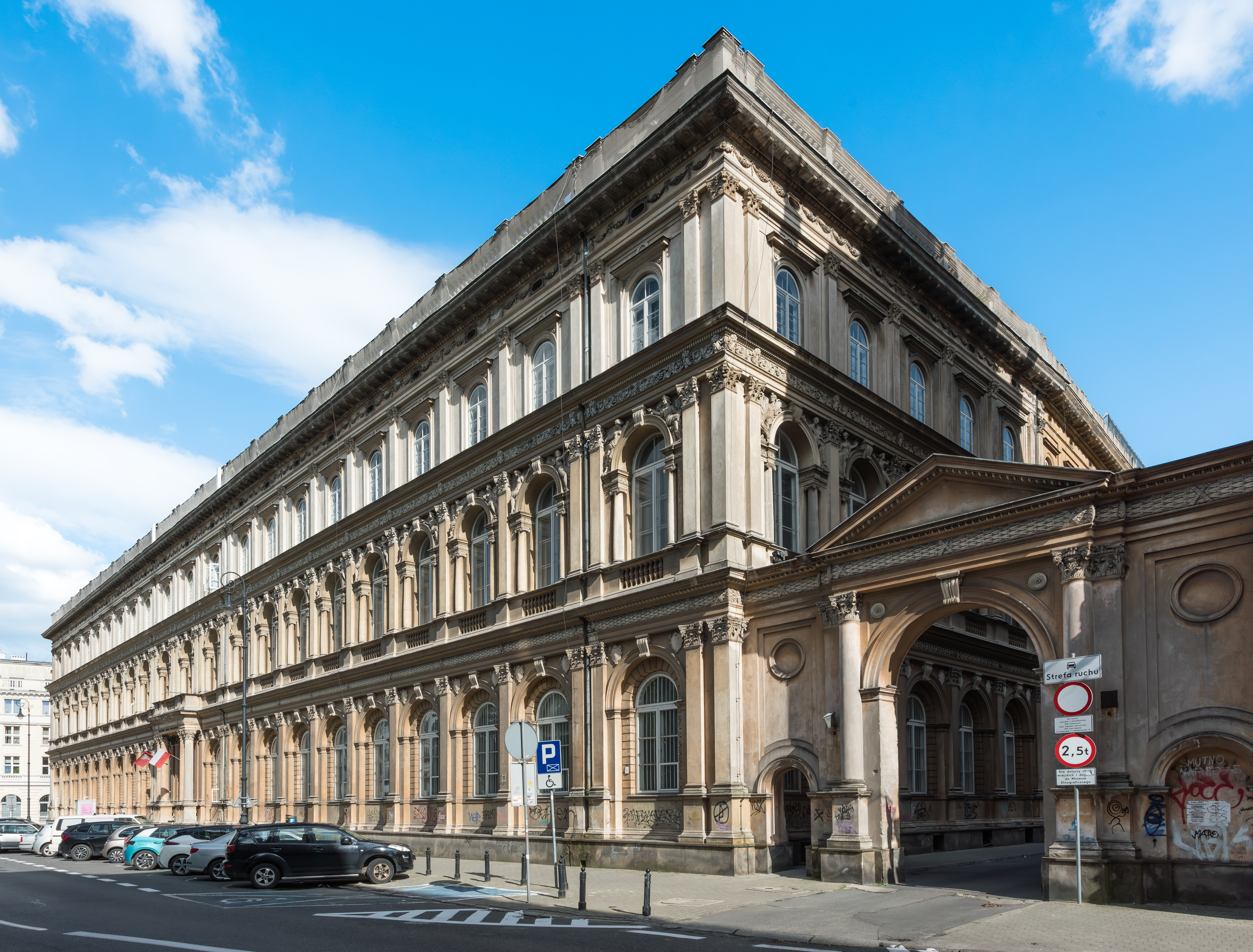
- The neo-renaissance building of the museum designed by Enrico Marconi.
- Established: 1888
- Location: Warsaw
- Type: ethnography
- Director: Adam Czyżewski
- Public transit access: Swietokrzyska
- Website: https://ethnomuseum.pl

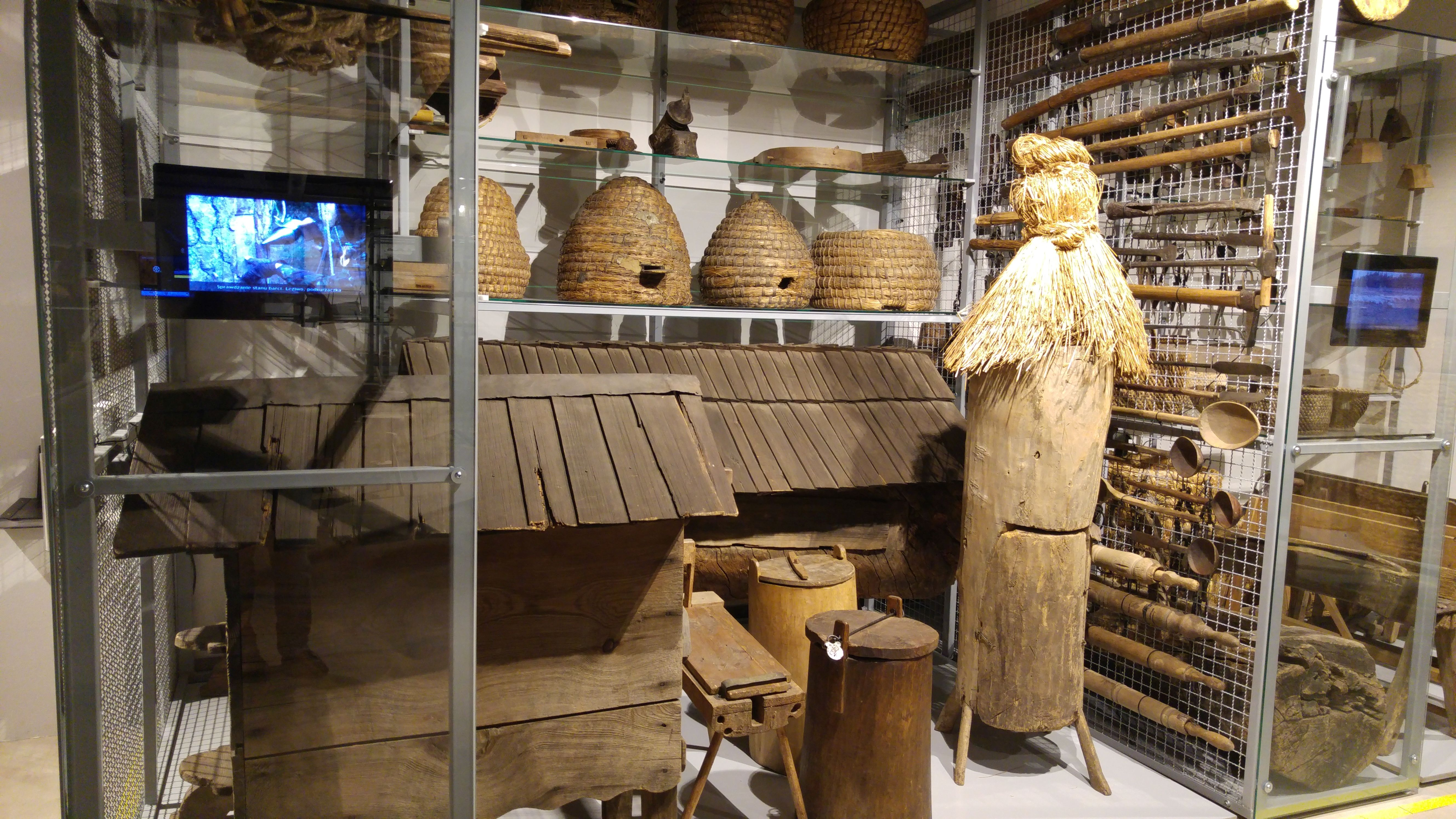
The Order of Things. The storeroom of Piotr Szacki.

The National Museum of Ethnography (Polish: Państwowe Muzeum Etnograficzne w Warszawie) is a museum of ethnography in Warsaw, Poland. It was established in 1888.

== Collection and exhibitions ==
The collection is made up of objects, folk art, costumes, crafts, sculptures, paintings and other art from Poland, Europe, Africa, Australia, Oceania and Latin and South America.

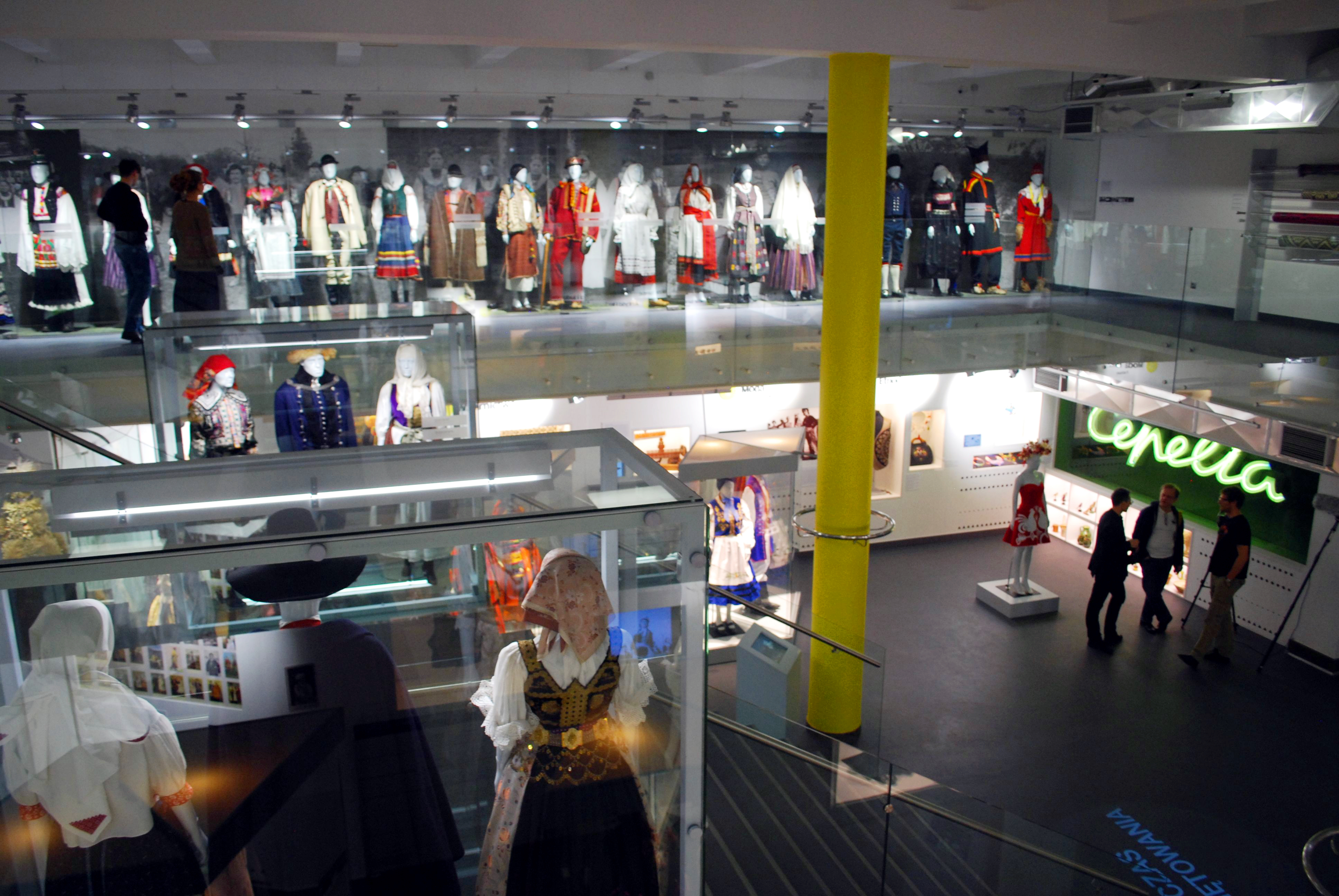
Polish folk costume permanent exhibition

The museum has a permanent exhibition, a library (around 26 000 volumes), a Photographic and Film Records Studio and a Central Repository for the Museum's Collections; it produces temporary exhibitions, research projects and publications.

The Polish collection is composed of around 13,500 exhibits in the permanent collection and over 1000 in the deposits.

The permanent exhibitions presented inside the museum are:

- The Ordinary – The Extraordinary. The Ethnographic Museum's Fascinating Collections. The Museum's 120th anniversary exhibition
- Celebration Time in Polish and European culture
- The Order of Things. The storeroom of Piotr B. Szacki

=== The African collection ===
The African collection is the richest collection in the museum with over ten thousand objects, mainly from Sub-Saharan Africa. The African collection is based on a donation by Wacław Korabiewicz which includes domestic and agricultural utensils, arms, costumes and clothing, jewelry, royal insignia, sculptures, masks and objects related to religious practices. In 1988 also Aleksandra and Cyprian Kosiński contributed to the museum's African collection with sculptures, masks and royal costumes of the Congolese tribes Bakuba, Bakongo, Chokwe. According to the museum, one of the most important objects of the African collection are helmet masks made by the East African Makonde tribe (Tanzania, Mozambique) which came from Wacław Korabiewicz's collection.

=== Carpathian culture: Czech Republic ===
For the 80 monuments from the Czech Republic, which are owned by NME in Warsaw as much as 75, come from the areas covered by the Carpathian settlement. These are mainly costumes, especially the almost complete female and male outfits of Jackowie – tiny Polish ethnic group living in the Czech Silesia, around the town Jablunkov. These costumes have been reproduced by artisans or made in the Department of Conservatory of NME in Warsaw on the basis of the originals of this ethnic group kept at the Museum of Cieszyn Silesia in Cieszyn. The museum has also a large representation of brass, silver plated buttons (up to 18 pieces) characteristic for the Jackowie costumes. These buttons are copies of originals from the Museum collections in Cieszyn, too.

NME in Warsaw has a full women's outfit from the South Moravian Region, and even some overlapping elements, such as the halls. All these elements are a gift of the National Folk Culture Institute in Strážnice in Moravia, were made in the 20th century. Individual pieces of clothing come from other regions, as well as the 20th century corset from the Olomouc Region.

Two paintings representing the culture of the Carpathians in the Czech Republic are:

- glass painting "Pieta" from the 19th century from Moravia
- paper painting "Ecce Homo" from Moravia from 1909
- eight Easter eggs, Easter rod and a pipe from region around the town Zlín (Moravian Wallachia) made in 2017
- a sculpture made by the folk artist Jan Brlica, Jr. in 2017 was featured on the sculptures of today

Descriptions of these monuments can be found in the program Musnet - electronic catalog or paper catalog at the headquarters of the NEM in Warsaw.

=== Carpathian culture: Slovakia ===
The collection consists of 196 exhibits, including the 29 oldest dating from the 19th century. These are:

- 35 Easter-eggs (from: Čadca, Veľká Čausa, Martin, Levoča, Veľký Grob, Poprad, Domaniža regions)
- 15 Christmas decorations (from regions of Čadca and Martin) and 2 sculptural Nativities (made by Anton Kadury from Podvysoká village)
- 11 potteries (origin unknown) and 1 ceramic stoup from Martin
- 22 religious glass painting (19 of them made in the 19th century and 1 titled „Carol singers” made by Zuzana Vanoušová from Čadca in 2000)
- 1 xylograph (the date of production unknown)
- 1 sculpture from a pilgrim place, made at the end of the 19th century, presenting Madonna from Zlatá Hora Monastery in the Czech Republic
- 7 religious objects (contemporary picture of Madonna from Frivaldská kalvária, contemporary rosary, painting from the middle of the 19th century, waxes ex-votos from Stará Ľubovňa (Polish: Stara Lubovla), the end of the 19th century, small stoup from Trenčín)
- wooden shelf for spoons and wooden bucket
- costumes collection: 6 complete or almost complete sets of women costumes from: Brezovo – 1910, Trenčín – 1935, Piešťany – (the date of production unknown), Brezno – 1920s, Nová Ľubovňa (Polish: Nowa Lubovla) – 1940s and 2017, Čáčov – 1930 – (girl's costume), 1 complete man costume from Trenčín region, made in the 1920s. Also: a man's belt from the region of Liptov, woman's beads, sheepskin coat, woman's and man's shoes and ruffs.

Descriptions of these monuments can be found in the program Musnet - electronic catalog or in the published catalog at the headquarters of the NEM in Warsaw.

== Departments ==
The museum is managed by a director, and it is organized into the departments of Polish and European ethnography, non-European ethnography, adult education, Museum for Children, educational, communication and marketing, publications, archival material and photographic and film records, accounting and finance, personnel, administrative and technical, inventory and conservation.

The museum has published its own magazine, "Zeszyty Muzealne", from the 1960s to the beginning of the 1980s; in October 2009 it started a new quarterly magazine called "Etnografia Nowa" ["The New Ethnography"]. In 2011 the museum received grants to renovate the building and create a children's ethnographic museum within its walls.

== See also ==
- List of registered museums in Poland
