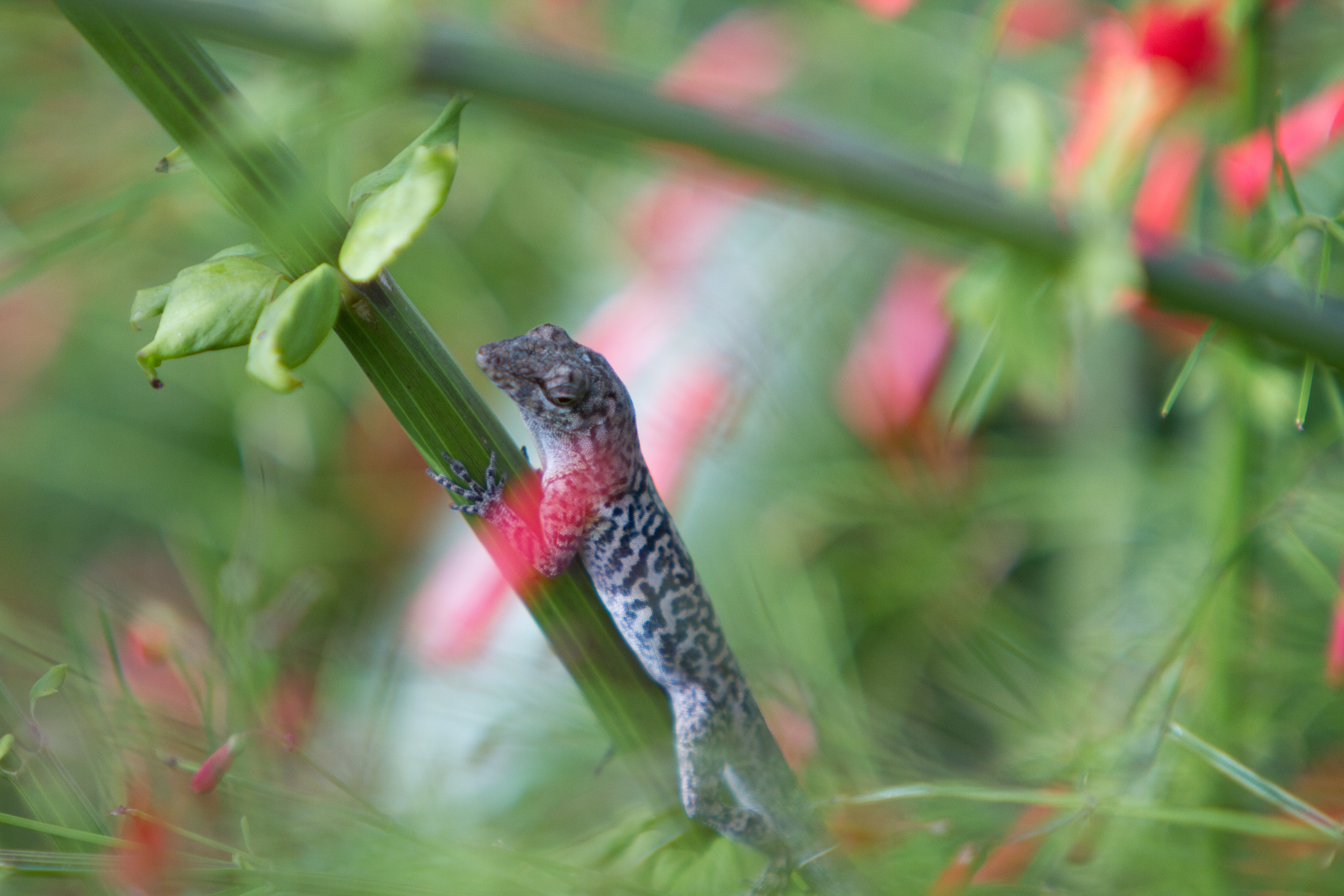

Conservation status
- Vulnerable (IUCN 3.1)

Scientific classification
- Kingdom: Animalia
- Phylum: Chordata
- Class: Reptilia
- Order: Squamata
- Suborder: Iguania
- Family: Dactyloidae
- Genus: Anolis
- Species: A. bonairensis

Binomial name
- Anolis bonairensis Ruthven, 1923

= Anolis bonairensis =

Species of lizard

Anolis bonairensis, the Bonaire anole or Ruthven's anole, is a species of lizard in the family Dactyloidae. The species is found in Bonaire and in Las Aves Archipelago, Venezuela,
