= Las Aves Archipelago =

Federal Dependency of Venezuela

Archipiélago Las Aves
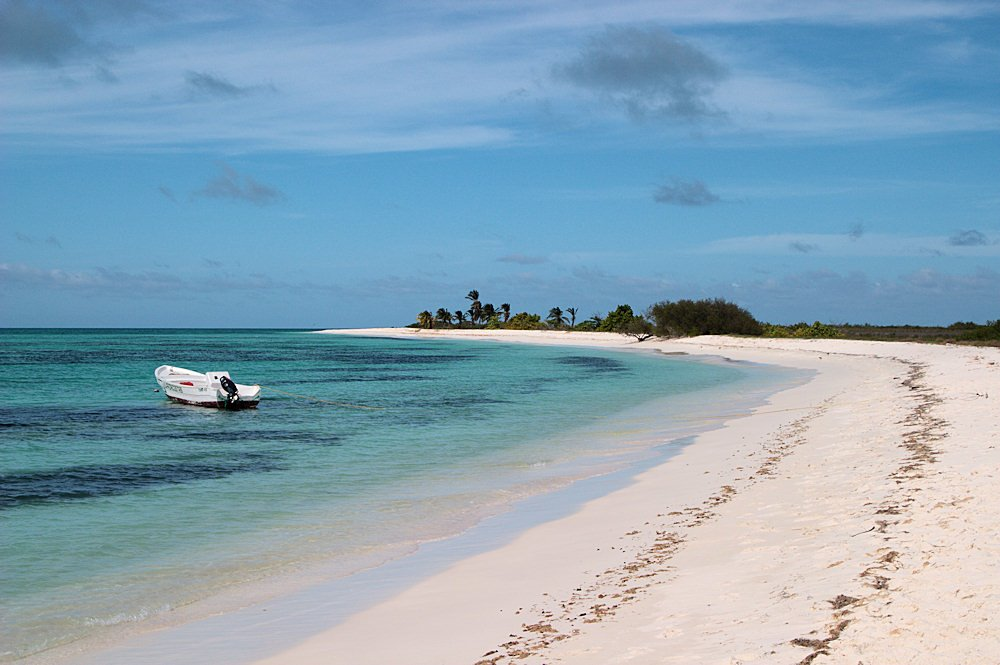
- Las Aves
- Interactive map of Archipiélago Las Aves

Geography
- Location: Caribbean Sea
- Coordinates: 11°57′23″N 67°25′51″W
- Archipelago: Leeward Antilles
- Area: 3.35 km^{2} (1.29 sq mi)
- Highest elevation: 16 m (52 ft)

Administration
- Venezuela
- Federal Dependencies

The Las Aves Archipelago is a pristine archipelago in the Caribbean Sea, and is a part of the Federal Dependencies of Venezuela. It is located north of the Venezuelan states of Aragua and Carabobo, between the Dutch island Bonaire in the west, and the Los Roques Archipelago in the east, at 12°00′N 67°40′W. The prime economic importance of the islands lies in fishing. "Las Aves" translates to "The Birds" in English.

== History ==
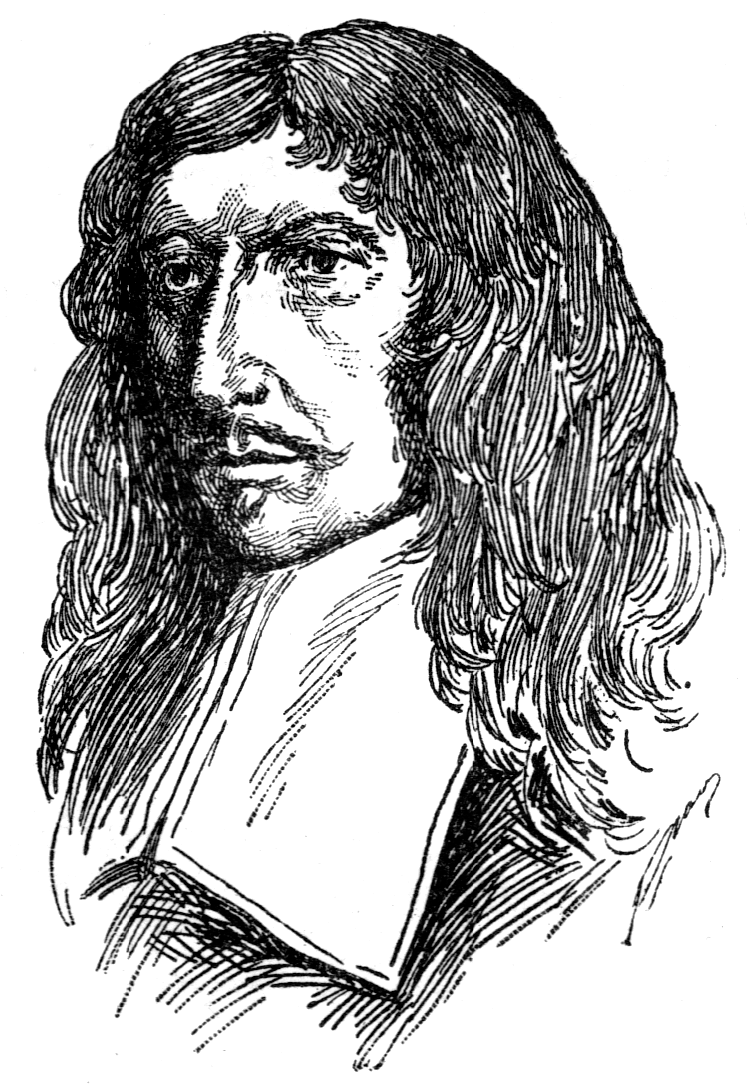
Admiral Jean d'Estrées

Las Aves was the site of a major Dutch victory over the French in 1678, when a French fleet commanded by Admiral Jean d'Estrées on its way to capture the nearby Dutch island Curaçao was decoyed onto the reefs of Aves de Sotovento by a small force of three Dutch ships. When D'Estrees' ship hit the reef, he fired cannons as a warning to the ships behind. However, they interpreted the signal to mean that he was under attack so they came rushing to his aid - and likewise struck the reefs.

The entire French fleet of 13 ships was lost as a result of the Admiral's eagerness to fight. The survivors found no fresh water on Las Aves. They tried to survive on barrels of wine and salted meat that washed ashore. But these supplies ran out and eventually they perished. The Admiral was one of the few to be rescued. On Curaçao, a Day of Thanksgiving was observed until far into the 18th century to commemorate the island's fortunate escape from being ravaged by the French.

Las Aves was considered by the Dutch as part of their West Indian possessions. In The Dutch West Indies (Amsterdam, 1836), Marten Douwes Teenstra wrote, "The Government of Curaçao also includes the uninhabited islets and rocks Little Curaçao, Aves, Roques and Orchilla."

In 1978, Venezuela and the Kingdom of the Netherlands established the marine limits between the Federal Dependencies and the Dutch Antilles in the Caribbean Sea.

== Geography ==
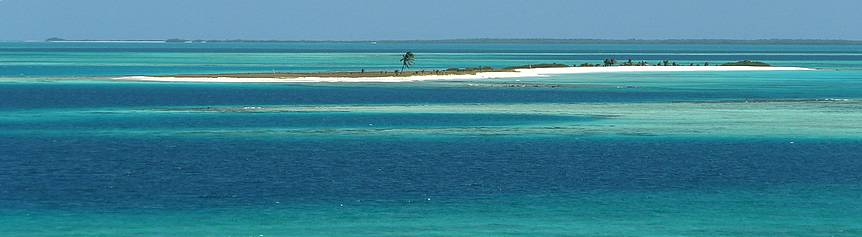
Las Aves archipelago

The archipelago consists of two atoll-like reef complexes:

- Aves de Barlovento, the eastern group, with a fringing reef of 8 km of diameter and with three cays in the southwest
  - Isla Aves de Barlovento
  - Isla Tesoro
  - Cayo Bubi
  - Cayo de Las Bobas
- Aves de Sotavento, the western group, with Isla Maceta, a large mangrove-covered cay in the south.
  - Isla Aves de Sotavento
  - Isla Larga
  - Cayo Tirra
  - Isla Saquisaqui
  - Cayos de La Colonia
  - Isla Maceta
  - Cayo Sterna

In total, there are 21 islets and islands in both groups. The archipelago is not to be confused with Aves Island, which is the most remote island claimed by Venezuela, far to the north.

== Gallery ==
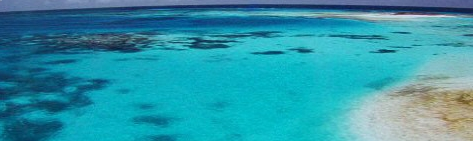

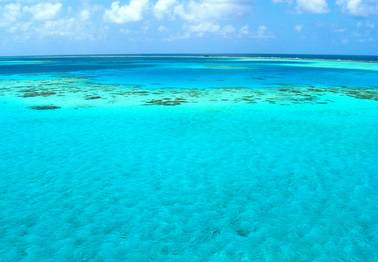

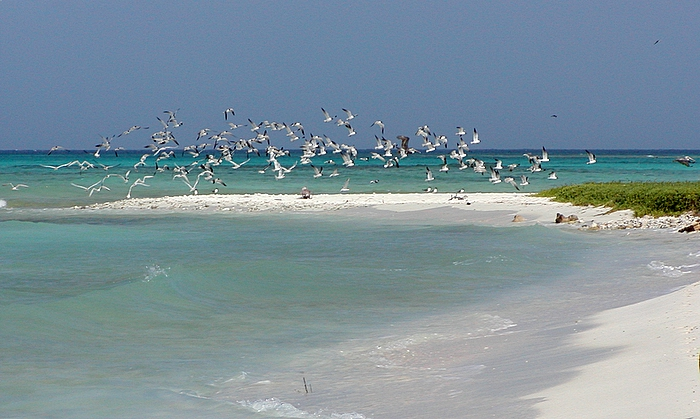

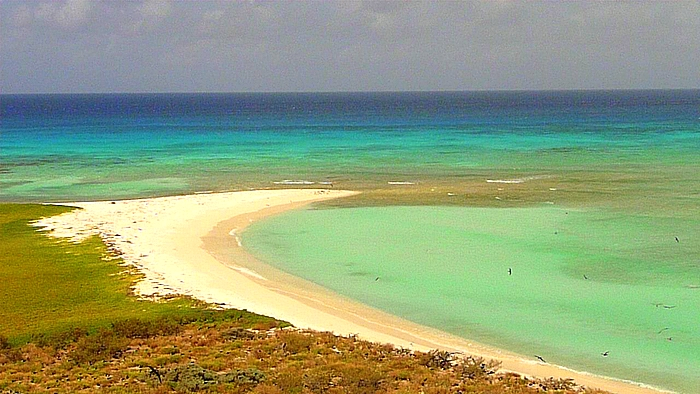

== See also ==
- Federal Dependencies of Venezuela
- List of marine molluscs of Venezuela
- List of sponges of Venezuela
