= List of places visited by Ibn Battuta =

This is a list of places visited by Ibn Battuta in the years 1325–1353.

== Overview ==
The Moroccan traveller Ibn Battuta set out from his native town of Tangiers on a pilgrimage to Mecca in June 1325, when he was 21 years old. On completing his first hajj he continued travelling, only returning to Morocco twenty four years later in 1349. In 1350, Battuta visited Al-Andalus and then between 1352–1353 he crossed the Sahara to visit the Mali Empire in West Africa. On his return to Fes he dictated an account of his travels to Ibn Juzayy, a scribe employed by Abu Inan Faris, the Marinid ruler of Morocco.

Ibn Juzayy's Arabic text was translated into English by Hamilton Gibb and Charles Beckingham and published by the Hakluyt Society in four volumes between 1958 and 1994.

== List ==
Over his lifetime, Ibn Battuta travelled over 117,000 kilometres (73,000 miles) and visited around 40 present-day countries.

In the following list the Romanization used by Gibb and Beckingham is given in parentheses. The states are modern. Within each section the towns are listed in the order that they are first mentioned in Ibn Battuta's rihla. Historians such as Hamilton Gibb and Ross Dunn have argued that some parts of Ibn Battuta's rihla are fictional and it is extremely unlikely that he visited all the places that he claimed. The cities for which these scholars argue that Ibn Battuta's visit was fictional are flagged as "disputed" in the list below.

=== Maghreb ===
- Tangier, Morocco
- Tlemcen (Tilimsān), Algeria
- Miliana (Milyāna), Algeria
- Algiers (al-Jazā'ir), Algeria
- Béjaïa (Bijāya), Algeria
- Constantine (Qusanṭīna), Algeria
- Annaba (Būna), Algeria
- Tunis, Tunisia
- Sousse (Sūsa), Tunisia
- Sfax (Ṣafāqus), Tunisia
- Gabès (Qābis), Tunisia
- Tripoli (Aṭrābulus), Libya
- Taza (Tāzā), Morocco
- Fez (Fās), Morocco
- Ceuta (Sabta), Spain
- Marrakesh (Marrākush), Morocco
- Salé (Salā), Morocco
- Meknes (Miknāsa), Morocco
- Sijilmasa (Sijilmāsa), Morocco

=== Mashriq ===
- Alexandria (al-Iskandarīya), Egypt
- Damanhur (Damanhūr), Egypt
- Fuwwah (Fawwā), Egypt
- Ibyar (Abyār), Egypt 30.839°N 30.864°E
- El Mahalla El Kubra (al-Maḥalla al-Kabīra), Egypt
- Damietta (Dimyāt), Egypt
- Faraskur (Fāriskūr), Egypt
- Sebennytos or Samannoud (Samannūd), Egypt
- Cairo (Miṣr), Egypt
- Biba, Egypt 28.922°N 30.984°E
- Oxyrhynchus (al-Bahnasa), Egypt
- Minya (Munyat Ibn Khaṣīb), Egypt
- Mallawi (Manlāwī), Egypt
- Manfalut (Manfalūṭ), Egypt
- Asyut (Asyūṭ), Egypt
- Akhmim (Ikhmīm), Egypt
- Hu (Hū), Egypt
- Qena (Qinā), Egypt
- Qus (Qūṣ), Egypt
- Luxor (al-Aqṣur), Egypt
- Esna (Asnā), Egypt
- Edfu (Adfū), Egypt
- ʿAydhab (‘Aidhāb), Egypt
- Bilbeis (Balbais), Egypt
- Gaza (Ghazza), Gaza Strip, Palestine
- Hebron (al-Khalīl), West Bank, Palestine
- Bethlehem (Bait Laḥm), West Bank, Palestine
- Jerusalem (al-Quds)
- Ramla (al-Ramla), Israel
- Nablus (Nābulus ), West Bank, Palestine
- Ajloun (‘Ajlun), Jordan
- Tyre (Sūr), Lebanon
- Sidon (Ṣaidā), Lebanon
- Tripoli (Aṭrābulus), Lebanon
- Hama (Ḥamāh), Syria
- Aleppo (Ḥalab), Syria
- Antioch (Antākiya), Turkey
- Bagras (Bughrās), Turkey
- Latakia (al-Lādhiqīya), Syria
- Baalbek (Ba‘labakk), Lebanon
- Damascus, Syria
- Al-Kiswah (al-Kiswa), Syria
- Al Karak (Al-Karak), Jordon
- Ma'an (Ma‘ān), Jordon

=== Arabian Peninsula ===
- Tabuk (Tabūk), Saudi Arabia
- Medina (al-Madīna), Saudi Arabia
- Rabigh (Rābigh), Saudi Arabia
- Mecca, Saudi Arabia
- Jeddah (Judda), Saudi Arabia
- Zabīd (Zabīd), Yemen
- Jibla (Jubla), Yemen
- Ta'izz (Ta'izz), Yemen
- Sana'a (Ṣan'ā'), Yemen Disputed.
- Aden ('Adan), Yemen
- Salalah (Zafāri), Oman
- Qalhat (Qalhāt), Oman
- Nizwa (Nazwā), Oman
- Bahrain (al-Baḥrain), Bahrain Adjacent shore.
- Qatif (al-Quṭaif), Saudi Arabia
- Hofuf or al-Hasa (Hajar), Saudi Arabia
- Al-Yamama (al-Yamama), Saudi Arabia 24°07′N 47°25′E

=== Iran and Iraq ===
- Najaf (al-Najaf), Iraq
- Basra (al-Basra), Iraq
- Abadan ('Abbādān), Iran
- Bandar-e Mahshahr (Māchūl), Iran
- Ramhormoz (Rāmiz), Iran
- Shushtar (Tustar), Iran
- Izeh (Īdhaj), Iran
- Isfahan (Iṣfahān), Iran
- Shiraz (Shīrāz), Iran
- Kazerun (Kāzarūn), Iran
- Kufa (al-Kūfa), Iraq
- Hillah (al-Ḥilla), Iraq
- Baghdad (Baghdād), Iraq
- Tabriz (Tabrīz), Iran
- Mosul (al-Mawṣil), Iraq
- Cizre (Jazīrat Ibn 'Omar), Turkey
- Sinjar (Sinjār), Iraq
- Mardin (Mārdīn), Turkey
- Hormuz (New Hurmuz), Iran
- Lar (Lār), Iran

=== East Africa ===
- Suakin (Sawākin), Sudan
- Zeila (Zaila'), Somalia
- Mogadishu (Maqdashaw), Somalia
- Mombasa (Mambasā), Kenya
- Kilwa (Kulwā), Tanzania

=== Anatolia ===
- Alanya (al-‘Alāyā), Turkey
- Antalya (Anṭāliya), Turkey
- Burdur (Burdūr), Turkey
- Isparta (Sabartā), Turkey
- Eğirdir (Akrīdūr), Turkey
- Gölhisar (Qul-Ḥiṣār), Turkey
- Laodicea on the Lycus near Denizli (Lādhiq), Turkey
- Tavas (Ṭawās), Turkey
- Muğla (Mughla), Turkey
- Milas (Mīlās), Turkey
- Konya (Qūniya), Turkey
- Karaman (al-Lāranda), Turkey
- Aksaray (Aqsarā), Turkey
- Niğde (Nakda), Turkey
- Kayseri (Qaisarīya), Turkey
- Sivas (Sīwās), Turkey
- Amasya (Amāṣiya), Turkey
- Uluköy (Sūnusā), Turkey
- Gümüşhane (Kumish), Turkey
- Erzincan (Arzananjān), Turkey
- Erzurum (Arz al-Rūm), Turkey
- Birgi (Birgī), Turkey
- Tire (Tīra), Turkey
- Selçuk (Ayā Sulūq), Turkey
- İzmir (Yazmir), Turkey
- Manisa (Maghnīsīya), Turkey
- Bergama (Barghama), Turkey
- Balıkesir (Balī Kasrī), Turkey
- Bursa (Burṣā), Turkey
- İznik (Yasnīk), Turkey
- Geyve (Kāwiya), Turkey
- Taraklı (Yanijā), Turkey
- Göynük (Kainūk), Turkey
- Mudurnu (Maṭurnī), Turkey
- Bolu (Būlī), Turkey
- Gerede (Garadai), Turkey
- Safranbolu (Burlū), Turkey
- Kastamonu (Qaṣṭamūniya), Turkey
- Sinop (Ṣanūb), Turkey
- Constantinople, Turkey

=== Central Asia ===
- Feodosia (al-Kafā), Ukraine/Russia
- Stary Krym (al-Qiram), Ukraine/Russia
- Azov (Azāk), Russia
- Majar (al-Māchar), Russia
- Pyatigorsk (Bish Dagh), Russia
- Bolghar (Bulghār), Russia Disputed.
- Astrakhan (al-Ḥājj Tarhān), Russia
- New Sarai (al-Sarā), Russia
- Sarayshyk (Sarāchūq), Kazakhstan
- Konye-Urgench (Khwārizm), Turkmenistan
- Bukhara (Bukhārā), Uzbekistan
- Qarshi (Nakhshab), Uzbekistan
- Samarkand (Samarqand), Uzbekistan
- Termez (Tirmidh), Uzbekistan
- Balkh (Balkh), Afghanistan
- Herat (Harāt), Afghanistan Disputed.
- Torbat-e Jam (al-Jām), Iran Disputed.
- Tus (Ṭūs), Iran Disputed.
- Nishapur (Naisābūr), Iran Disputed.
- Bastam (Bisṭām), Iran Disputed.
- Kunduz (Qundūz), Afghanistan
- Ghazni (Ghazna), Afghanistan
- Kabul (Kābul), Afghanistan

=== South Asia ===
- Uch (Ūja), Pakistan
- Multan (Multān), Pakistan
- Abohar (Abūhar), India
- Pakpattan (Ajudahan), Pakistan
- Sirsa (Sarasatī), India
- Hansi (Ḥānsī), India
- Delhi (Dihlī), India
- Aligarh (Kuwil), India
- Kannauj (Qinauj), India
- Gwalior (Guyālyur), India
- Ujjain (Ujain), India
- Daulatabad (Dawlat Ābād), India
- Khambhat or Cambay (Kinbāya), India
- Gandhar (Qandahār), India 21.887°N 72.658°E
- Honnavar (Hinawr), India
- Mangalore (Manjarūr), India
- Kannur or Cannanore, India
- Kozhikode or Calicut (Qāliqūt), India
- Kollam or Quilon (Kawlam), India
- Malé (Mahal), Maldives
- Puttalam (Baṭṭāla), Sri Lanka
- Adam's Peak (Sarandīb), Sri Lanka
- Dondra Head (Dīnawar), Sri Lanka
- Chittagong, Bangladesh or possibly Satgaon, India (Sudkāwān) Identification of Sudkāwān uncertain.
- Sonargaon (Sunarkāwān), Bangladesh

=== Southeast Asia ===
- Samudera Pasai Sultanate (Sumuṭra), Northern Sumatra, Indonesia Exact location uncertain.

=== China ===
- Quanzhou (Zaitūn), China
- Guangzhou or Canton (Ṣīn al-Ṣīn), China
- Fuzhou (Qanjanfū), China Uncertain.
- Hangzhou (al-Khansā), China Disputed.
- Beijing (Khān Bāliq), China Disputed.

=== Al-Andalus ===
- Gibraltar (Mountain of Victory), United Kingdom
- Ronda (Runda), Spain
- Marbella (Marbala), Spain
- Málaga (Málaga), Spain
- Granada (Gharnāṭa), Spain

=== Mali Empire and West Africa ===
- Taghaza (Taghāzā), Mali
- Oualata (Īwālātan), Mauritania
- Timbuktu (Tunbuktū), Mali
- Gao (Kaukau), Mali
- Takedda (Takaddā), Niger
- Tuat (Tawāt), Algeria

=== Itinerary 1325–1332 ===
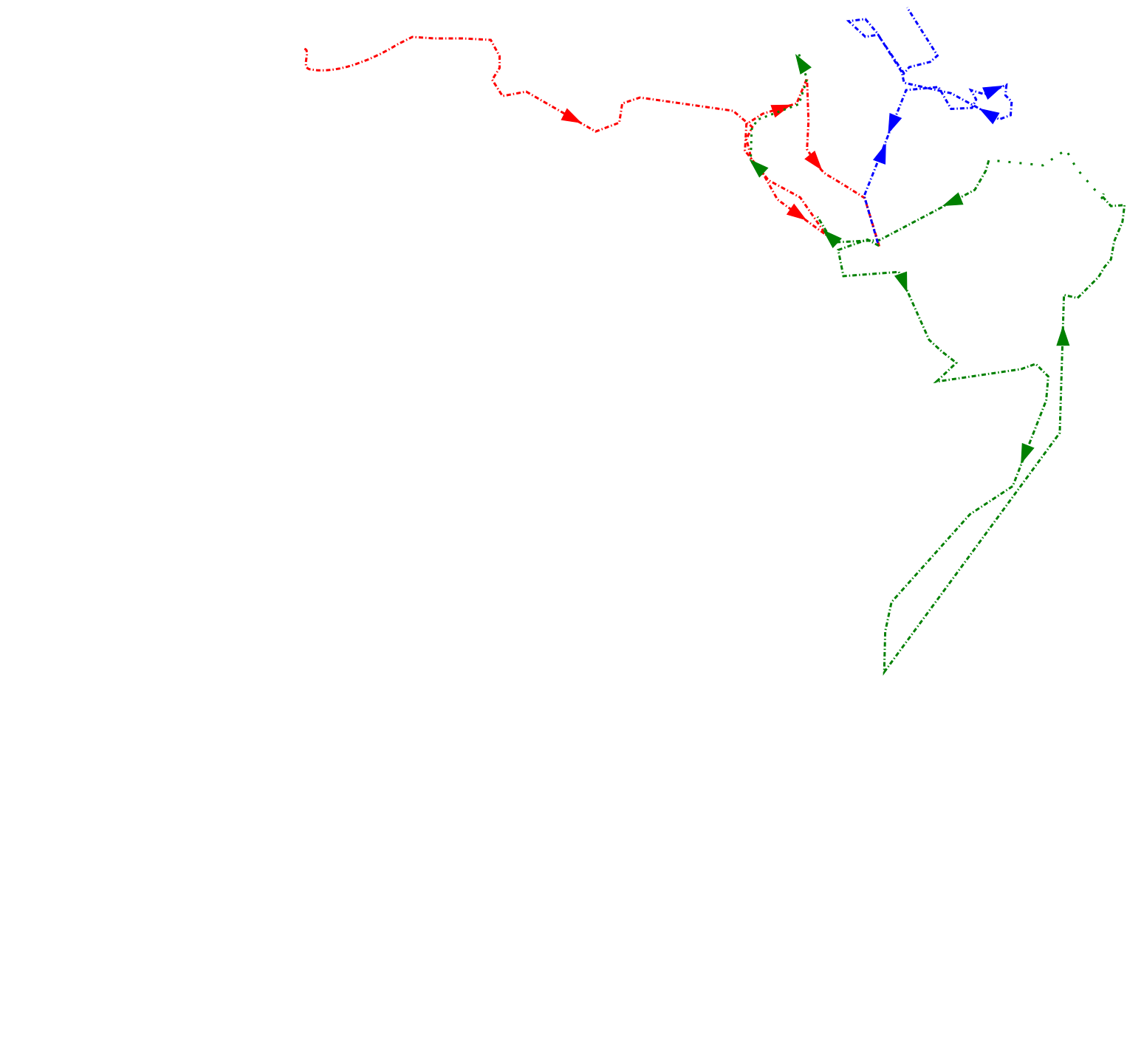
Ibn Battuta Itinerary 1325–1332 (North Africa, Iraq, Persia, the Arabian Peninsula, Somalia, Swahili Coast)

=== Itinerary 1332–1346 ===
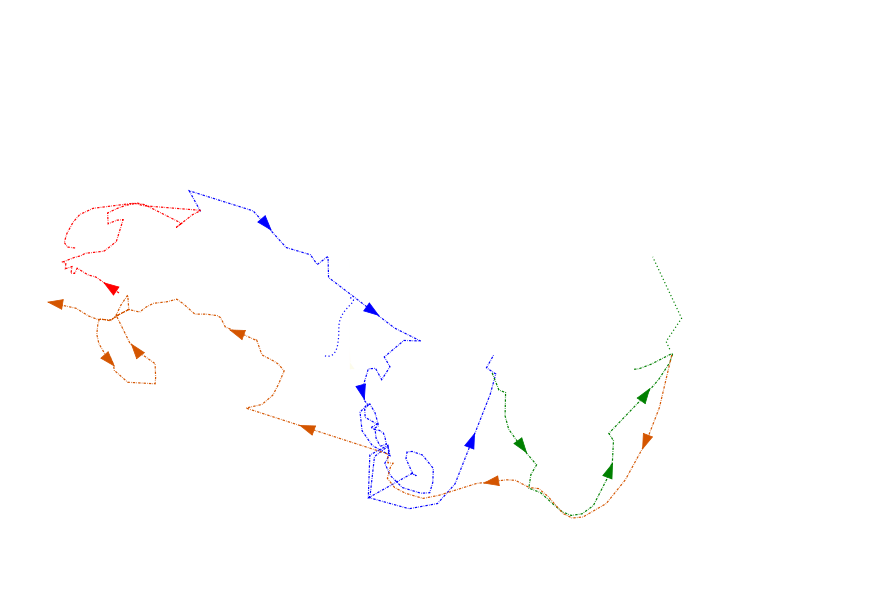
Ibn Battuta Itinerary 1332–1346 (Black Sea Area, Central Asia, India, South East Asia and China)

=== Itinerary 1349–1353 ===
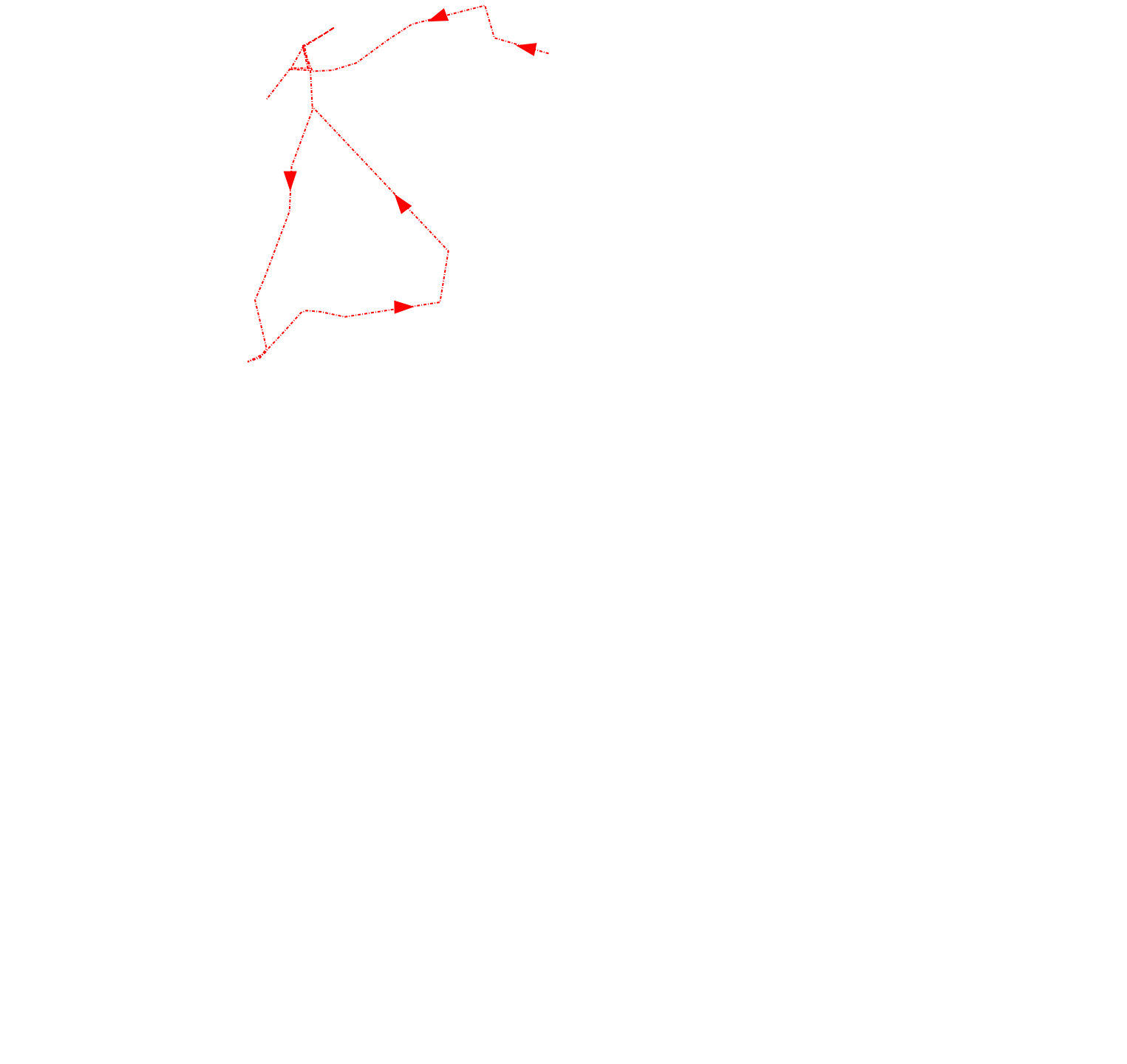
Ibn Battuta Itinerary 1349–1354 (North Africa, Spain and West Africa)

== Sources ==
- Dunn, Ross E. (2005). The Adventures of Ibn Battuta. University of California Press. ISBN 0-520-24385-4.. First published in 1986, ISBN 0-520-05771-6.
- Gibb, H.A.R., ed. (1958). The Travels of Ibn Baṭṭūṭa, A.D. 1325–1354 (Volume 1). London: Hakluyt Society.
- Gibb, H.A.R., ed. (1962). The Travels of Ibn Baṭṭūṭa, A.D. 1325–1354 (Volume 2). London: Hakluyt Society.
- Gibb, H.A.R., ed. (1971). The Travels of Ibn Baṭṭūṭa, A.D. 1325–1354 (Volume 3). London: Hakluyt Society.
- Gibb, H.A.R.; Beckingham, C.F., eds. (1994). The Travels of Ibn Baṭṭūṭa, A.D. 1325–1354 (Volume 4). London: Hakluyt Society. ISBN 978-0-904180-37-4. This volume was translated by Beckingham after Gibb's death in 1971. A separate index was published in 2000.
