= The Year of Spring =

- First edition
- Author: Vyacheslav Krasko
- Original title: Russian: Год Весны
- Language: Russian
- Publisher: Postum (Moscow)
- Publication date: 2012
- Publication place: Russia
- Pages: 414
- ISBN: 978-5-91478-014-9

The Year of Spring: The Travel What Lasts a Year (Russian: Год Весны: Путешествие длиною в год) is a book written by Vyacheslav Vasilyevich Krasko, Russian traveler and member of the Union of the Russian Around-the-World Travelers, based on his yearlong journey around the world. In the book he shares thoughts, emotions, and impressions from the trip.

Critics are unable to place A Year of Spring into a particular genre. It is part novel, autobiography, travel guide book, and handbook of regional geography. Exotic landscapes descriptions, dialogues with locals and good memories all have their place in this travel story.

Krasko started writing his book in early 2010 and finished in 2011. It was completed in Sarankot – a small village near Pokhara, Nepal (located 5000 ft above sea level).

== Plot ==
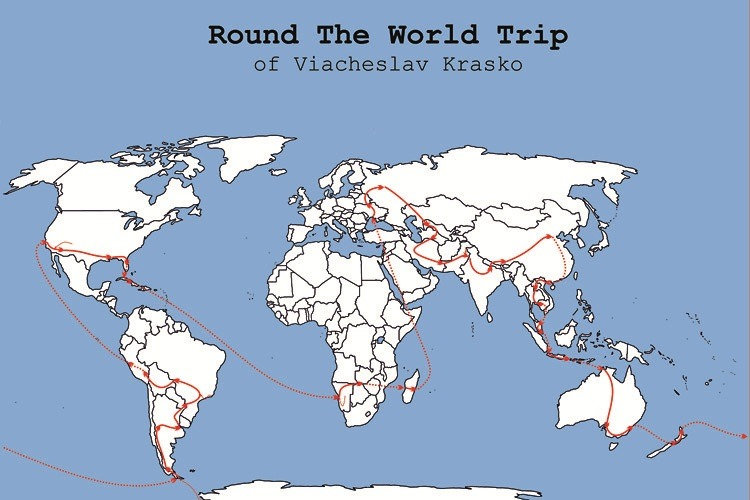
Round the world trip of Vyacheslav Krasko

Vyacheslav Krasko tells his own story throughout the book. As an executive who reached financial independence and high status in society, he suddenly realizes hard principles and rationalism have displaced the most important things in life: happiness, freedom and true feelings.

To find the meaning of life, he breaks up with his sweetheart, moves house, leaves his job and buys a one-way ticket leaving Moscow. His new life has begun.

He starts his travel in the spring, a season symbolizing new beginnings.

Asia, Australia, South America, Antarctic, North America, Africa and finally Europe...

Each day of travel was different from the others. Splendid ancient architecture changed to wild nature, and cities alternated with small villages. The author tries one thing after another, like that of a child, and shares his thoughts and impressions with readers. One of the most important discoveries he makes is that a man doesn't have to live by others' ideals.

Will it be worth it to return to his old lifestyle? Day-to-day routine could absorb him again. He will not return.

He returned to Moscow, but he has not given up on his new ideas.

== See also ==
- Travel
- Travel literature
