= Gunther Holtorf =

German world traveler

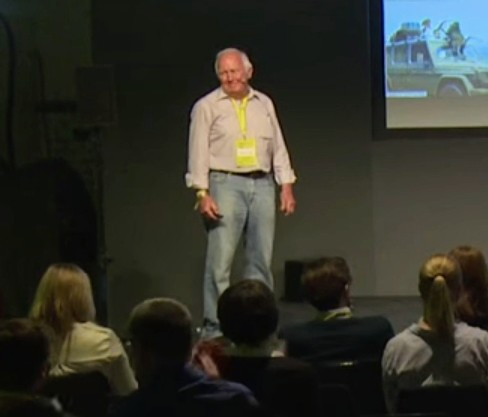
- Gunther Holtorf in 2015
- Born: July 4, 1937; Göttingen, Germany
- Died: October 4, 2021 (aged 84)
- Years active: 1989–2014
- Known for: World traveler

Gunther W. Holtorf (4 July 1937 – 4 October 2021) was a German world traveler who, often in company of his partner Christine, journeyed approximately 560,000 mi (900,000 km) across the world in his G-Wagen Mercedes-Benz named "Otto", visiting 179 countries in 26 years.

== Travels ==
Holtorf had a lengthy career with Lufthansa beginning in 1958, and eventually became an overseas representative; he was later a managing director at Hapag-Lloyd. He developed a love of travel while working in Argentina. In 1989, Holtorf left his job to take an on-the-road journey, beginning with the idea of spending 18 months discovering the African countryside in his 1988 G-Wagen. He was accompanied on this initial trip by his third wife Beate, and after their divorce embarked on another leg with companion Christine beginning in 1990. The couple subsequently travelled a few months out of most years, with a hiatus in 2000 and most of 2001, until picking up intensity in 2005 and beginning to travel almost non-stop throughout the year. After Christine developed cancer, her son Martin sometimes took her place as Holtorf's travelling companion, beginning in 2007. After her final trip in May 2009, Christine settled in Bavaria, where the couple wed several weeks before her death in June 2010. Holtorf resumed traveling with Martin or with Elke Dreweck until 2014.

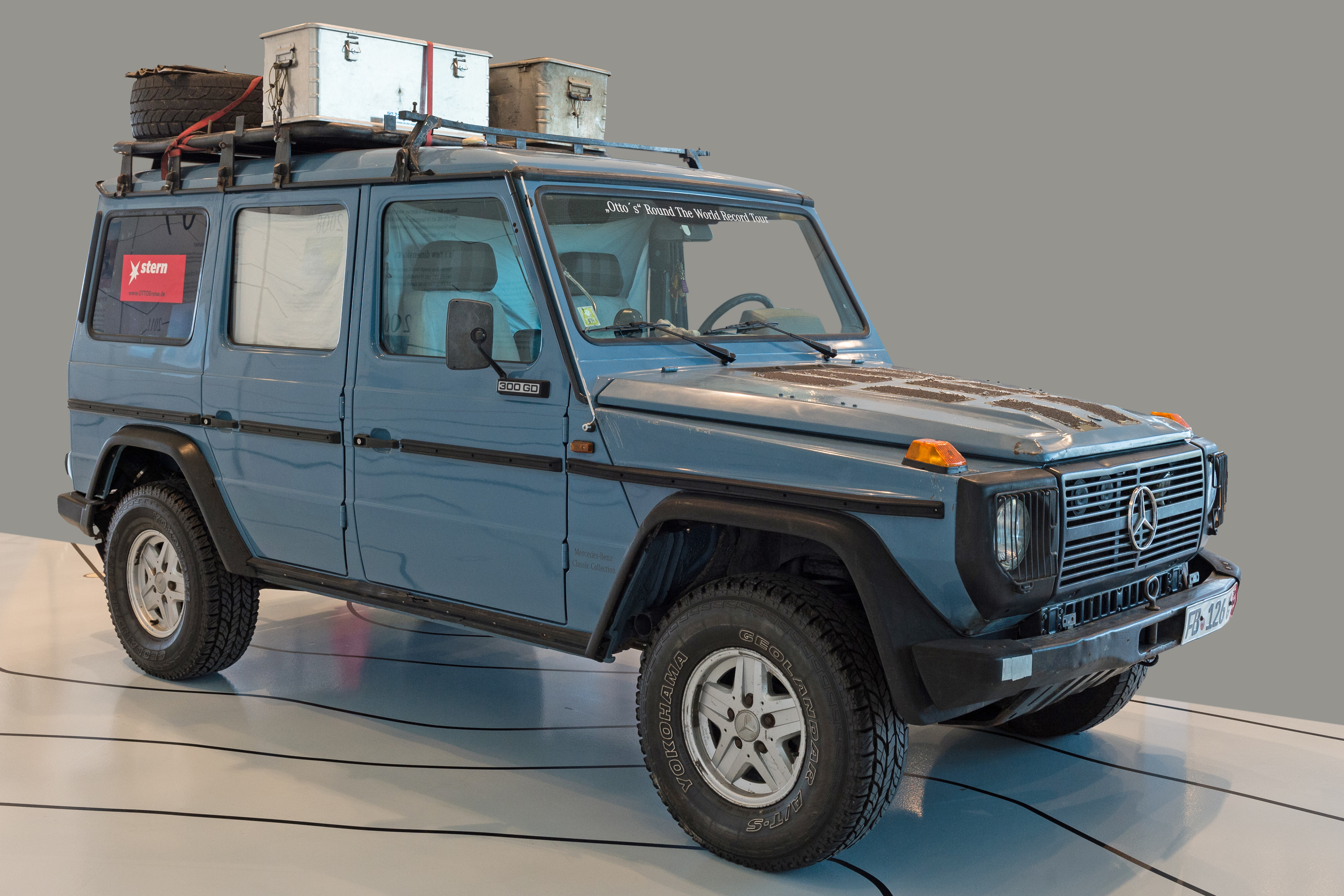
Otto, Holtorf's G-Wagen.

For the first five years, Holtorf and his companion travelled through Africa, thereafter shipping the car to South America to continue their journeys there. Through subsequent years, they travelled upwards through Central America, the United States and Canada before traveling south again and shipping the car to Australia and Asia and through the Caribbean and into other regions of the world. By the end of the voyage, Holtorf had driven through 179 countries in 26 years. In some countries Otto was the first personal car permitted belonging to a foreigner, and Holtorf was the first Westerner to drive in North Korea.

Holtorf travelled inexpensively, avoiding hotels and sleeping in the car, from which the rear seats were removed or in hammocks pitched near it, supporting his trips by map making. His map of Jakarta, begun before his voyages in 1977 but updated during them, is the first detailed map of the city. As of 2001, it was 385 pages long. Holtorf has also extensively photographed his voyage. His car is displayed in the Mercedes museum in Stuttgart.

== Works ==
- 1970 - Hong Kong - Welt Der Gegensätze published in English as Hong Kong - World of Contrasts (translator Donna Silberberg)
- 1977 - Jakarta-Jabotabek Street Atlas and Names Index, first published as a folded map and subsequently expanded in many editions such as the 12th edition of 2001, which was a book of 385 pages.

== See also ==
- List of travelers
