= Charles Fraser Beckingham =

English academic (1914–1998)

Charles Fraser Beckingham, FBA (18 February 1914 in Houghton, Huntingdonshire – 30 September 1998 in Lewes, East Sussex) was a professor of Islamic studies at Manchester University (1958–1965) and London University (1965–1981).

== Early life ==
Beckingham was born in Houghton, Huntingdonshire. His father was artist Arthur Beckingham. Beckingham read English at Queens' College, Cambridge, where he was a friend of Cyril Bibby. He worked for the Department of Printed Books in the British Museum from 1936 until 1946, interrupted by military and naval Intelligence service during World War II from 1942 until 1946. During that time he added to the Admiralty Handbook of Western Arabia.

== Academic career ==
He joined Manchester University as lecturer in Islamic history in 1951, becoming a professor of Islamic studies in 1958. In Cyprus he studied the history of the Turkish community. In 1965, Beckingham became a professor of Islamic studies at the School of Oriental and African Studies (Soas), at London University and was head of the Department of the Near and Middle East from 1969 until 1972. He retired in 1981 and was elected a Fellow of the British Academy in 1983.

=== Other publications ===
He wrote Between Islam and Christendom (1983) from his lectures and articles, and collaborated with Edward Ullendorff on Hebrew letters of Prester John and in 1996 with Bernard Hamilton on Prester John, the Mongols and the Ten Lost Tribes. He finished Professor Sir Hamilton Gibb's translation and annotation of The Travels of Ibn Battuta – a project which had taken, as Beckingham noted, longer than the travels of Ibn Battuta himself.

He was one of the first to criticize Edward Said's Orientalism, emphasizing a long series of factual errors, as well as the neglect of German orientalism and confusions between “the more disgusting anti-Arab propaganda” in the USA and the work of true Orientalists.
