= Russell Hastings Millward =

American journalist and explorer (1877–1958)

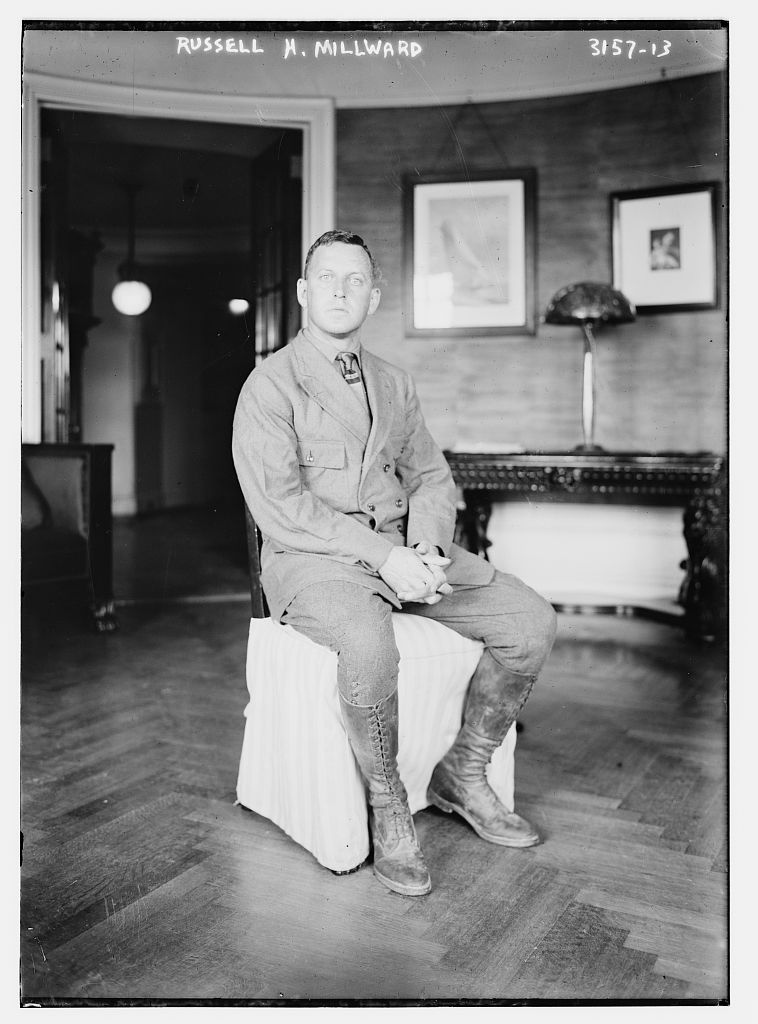
- Millward circa 1914
- Born: April 5, 1877; Cincinnati, Ohio
- Died: October 1, 1958 (aged 81); Pembroke, Massachusetts
- Education: University of Illinois College of Law; Columbia University
- Parent(s): Francis Millward; Margaret Ann Jones

Russell Hastings Millward (April 5, 1877 – October 1958) was an American inventor, writer, photographer and explorer. He claimed that he held the world record for travelling by foot in "unexplored, uncharted portions of Africa, South and Central America and Mexico".

== Biography ==
Russell Hastings Millward was born on April 5, 1877, in Cincinnati, Ohio, to Francis Millward and Margaret Ann Jones. He attended University of Illinois College of Law and later Columbia University.

In 1912 there were rumors that he married Madeline Ethel Sylvester.

In 1912 Millward declared that the jungles of Guatemala were the richest in the world with their hardwoods, rubber and chicle.

In 1913, during the Mexican Revolution, William Randolph Hearst misused a Millward image of children playing in the ocean in British Honduras for propaganda. It was portrayed as "children [that] were driven into the water, forced to hold their hands above their heads, and shot in the back."

He married Edna Pearl Boyden of Boston on August 27, 1914.

In 1934 a group of explorers proposed a "geographic theater" to be located in Manhattan devoted to "programs combining motion pictures, lantern slides, lectures and native music and dancing". Millward was to be the program director.

He died in October 1958 in Pembroke, Massachusetts.

== Memberships ==
He was a fellow of the Royal Geographical Society, and he was a lifetime corresponding member of the New York Zoological Society and the American Museum of Natural History.

== Patents ==
- Attachment for typewriters
- Combined ruler and letter-scale

== Works ==
- The Dolls of Cuerna Vaca (1910)
