= Wiebe Wakker =

Dutch motorcar driver

Wiebe Wakker is a Dutch motorcar driver and world traveler who also holds the current world record for completing the longest ever electric car trip in the world covering a distance of about 95,000 kilometres (59,000 mi). On 15 March 2016, he started his journey through his own electric car from his home country Netherlands to reach his final destination in Australia. On 7 April 2019, he managed to complete his journey taking 1,119 days by crossing 33 countries without even visiting a gas station.

== Record breaking journey ==
Wiebe Wakker, with the intention of promoting the awareness of electric cars in support of sustainability, commenced an electric car trip from Amsterdam, the capital city of Netherlands during March 2016 without having adequate amount of money and he was funded through the public donations across the world in order to generate electricity for his car, to consume sufficient food and a place to sleep. During his journey, he drove across a variety of countries including Turkey, India, Iran, Myanmar, Malaysia and Indonesia.

He ended his journey after reaching Sydney on 7 April 2019 after three years and thus creating a world record for completing the longest electric car ride. It was revealed that he used 17 megawatt-hours of electricity on the entire journey. His Plug Me In project inspired several people after revealing about his real cause for attempting such a journey and pledged them for food, shelter and electricity.
