= Akwaaba African Travel Market =

Tourism and hospitality event in Nigeria

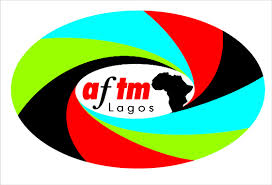
- Where Africa meets the world
- Status: Active
- Genre: Exhibitions, conference, workshops and awards.
- Frequency: Annually
- Location: Lagos, Nigeria
- Years active: 2005- present
- Participants: African countries, airlines, hotels, resorts, tourism boards, national parks, transport companies, destination marketers, travel and tour operators
- Attendance: 10,000
- Organizer: Akwaaba Travel Market Limited
- Website: africantravelmarkets.com

Akwaaba African Travel Market (AFTM) is an international travel, tourism and hospitality event organized annually in Lagos, Nigeria aimed at businesses, investors, governments decision - makers and buyers in the industry, providing business opportunities, industry news and showcasing products in Africa and around the world. It serves as a platform to trade and network. Akwaaba African Travel Market is the first travel market in West Africa.

The first Akwaaba African Travel Market (AFTM) was held in Lagos in 2005.

In 2005, from the participation of two countries, Ghana and Sao Tome, coming to Nigeria for the event in the debut year in 2005, the event has grown over the years with increasing number of active exhibitors within and outside Africa, with over 20 participating countries, about 10,000 attendance and having partnerships with Africa countries tourism boards, World Tourism Organization UNWTO, Africa Travel Association (ATA), Kwanza Trade Marketing of Dubai, African Business Travel Association (ABTA), International Tourism Trade Fair Association (ITTFA) and International Air Transport Association (IATA).

As quoted by Akwaaba African Travel Market organizer, Ikechi Uko: "The fair has opened the door to Nigeria and Africa tourism markets and served as a platform for exchange of cultural and tourism potentials among participating countries".

== Recognition ==
South Africa used Akwaaba African Travel market as a reaching platform to bridge her gap with Nigeria. According to the South African Tourism (SAT) "During Akwaaba, we officially announced our partnership with the National Association of Nigeria Travel Agencies (NANTA), who will help boost tourist arrivals growth from Nigeria to South Africa by developing a range of packages to suit the Nigerian travelers".

Lagos state, Nigeria endorsed Akwaaba African Travel market as the official designated travel event in Lagos state. According to the Lagos State Ministry for Tourism, Arts and Culture, "This is in fulfillment of the state government promise to announce a yearly calendar of events to guide programming, visiting tourists and visitor's decisions".

In line with IATA's objective, to foster connectivity in Africa in the industry, Akwaaba African Travel Market (AFTM) partnered with International Air Transport Association (IATA) to organize an Edition of Aviation Day at Akwaaba.

Akwaaba contributes in using Jollof rice to brand West Africa as a unified tourist attraction of the West Africa Region. As quoted by Ikechi Uko, "Sometime in 2016, I called a Strategy meeting at Akwaaba and told the team that we will start a Jollof Rice war between Nigeria and other West African countries at Akwaaba. We will scrap a sponsored event we hold and replace it with the contest. Why do we have to give up a paid project for a cost centre? I told them that West Africa has no Common Tourism Product unlike East Africa with its rich Wildlife and we needed to create one." Thirty chefs from Nigeria and Ghana took part in the first edition in 2017. With judges from East Africa and Southern Africa, the project, Jollof rice war, of using Jollof rice to brand West Africa was launched. The success of the jollof rice war by Akwaaba has made the West African Jollof rice a world culinary tourism attraction, with tourists and visitors coming to the region to have a taste of the food. American rapper Cardi B, during her visit to Nigeria, told her host she desired to have a taste of Nigerian jollof rice.
