= Ikechi Uko =

Nigerian Tourism Development Expert (born 1964)

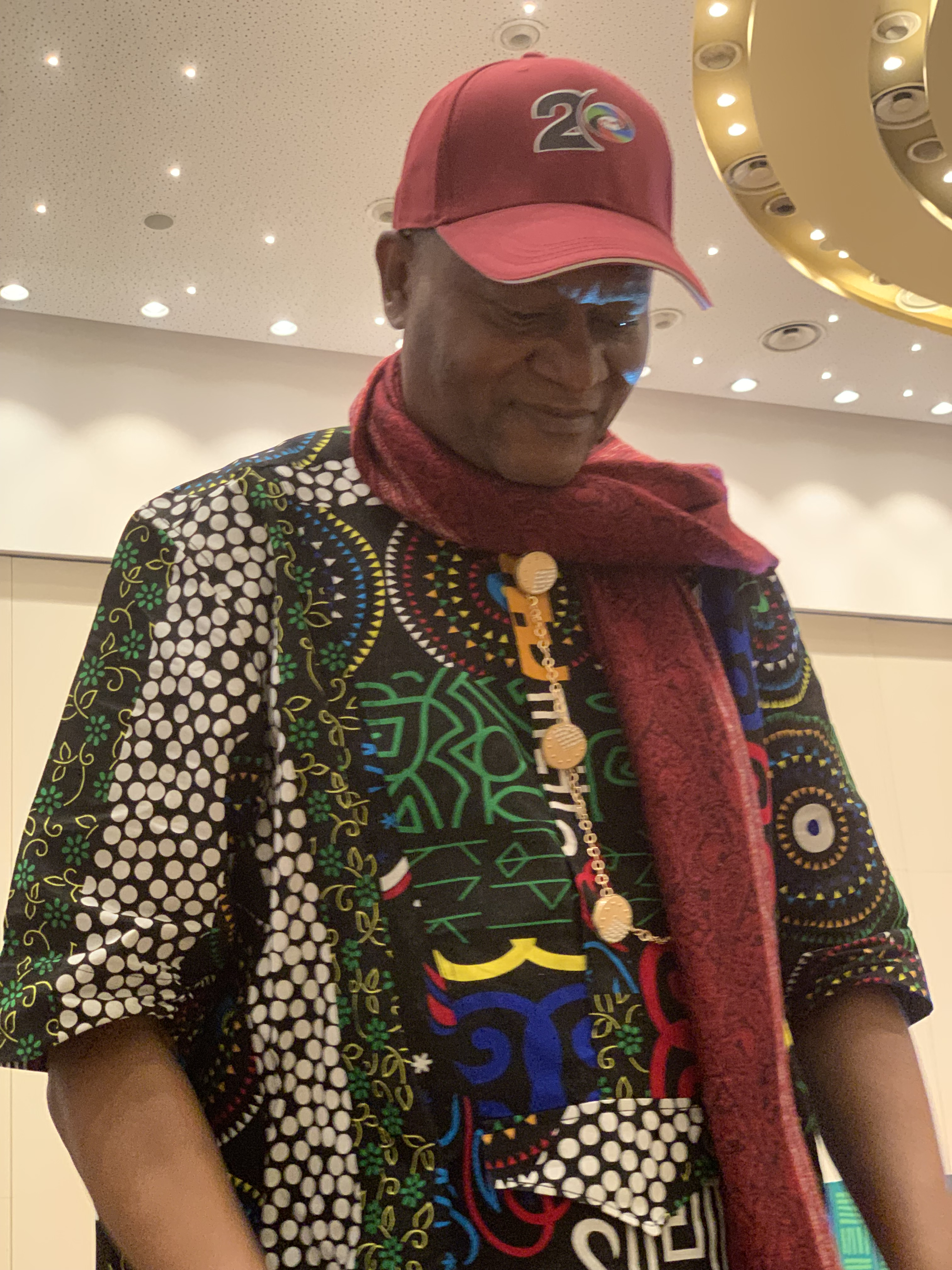
- Born: 12 January 1964 (age 62); Abia State, Nigeria
- Occupations: Media Consultant, Tourism Development Expert
- Years active: 1991–present
- Organizations: Akwaaba African Travel Market; Accra Weizo; Jedidah Promotions
- Website: atqnews.com

Ikechi Uko (born 12 January 1964) is a Nigeria travel business consultant, tourism developer, entrepreneur, media consultant, journalist, and author. He is the organizer of Akwaaba African Travel Market.

== Early life ==
Ikechi Uko was born in Abia, Nigeria on 12 January 1964 to Samson Uko and Salome Uko, (née Azubuike). Uko attended National Secondary School Nike in Enugu. He studied geography at the University of Ibadan and graduated in 1985. He then served in the National Youth Service Corps in Bauchi. Afterwards, he moved to Kano and taught at the Gwarzo Secondary School in Gwarzo and the Rogo Secondary School in Rogo. He returned to the University of Ibadan in 1988 to obtain his Masters Degree of Science in geography with an emphasis on environmental planning and remote sensing. His father Samson worked with the Nigerian Railway Corporation, which he has stated influenced his passion for travel.

== Career ==
Uko was an editor of Tourism Fact-finders, a book on Nigeria published to mark Nigeria's hosting of the Organization of African Unity (OAU) summit in 1991. Between 1991 and 1992, he was a tourism editor of Happy Land, Happy World Tourist Guide. Happy Land, Happy World was an attempted Nigerian version of Disneyland and Disney World, a project that did not materialize when its Certificate of Occupancy was revoked by the Lagos government. In 1998, he published "Festivals In Nigeria" in collaboration with The Nigerian Tourism Development Corporation (NTDC).

Inspired by his passion for traveling and adventures, he published Travelers Weekend Magazine, a weekly magazine founded in 1996, and later launched Travelers Awards. *Travelers Weekend* was the first regular travel magazine in West Africa. In 2004, he launched Travelers Awards and Exhibitions, and in 2005, Travelers Awards and Exhibition was rebranded as Akwaaba African Travel Market. Akwaaba African Travel Market is an international travel fair in West Africa with participation from international dealers in travel, tourism, aviation, and the hospitality industries. It is designated by the Nigerian Tourism Development Corporation (NTDC) as the official travel exhibition in Nigeria and is listed by United Nations World Tourism Organization (UNWTO), partnering with the National Association of Nigerian Travel Agencies (NANTA). It is the only member of the International Tourism Trade Fairs Association (ITTFA) in West Africa.

In 2010, with the ATQ magazine team, he set up a committee to choose the 7 wonders of Nigeria, known as Naija7Wonders.

Upon realizing that most travel businesses concentrate on Lagos instead of the other northern states, including capital Nigeria, he launched Abuja Bantaba on 5 July 2011. It is a one-day event for investors and clients in the travel and tourism business that includes workshops. In celebration of the centenary of Nigeria, the 4th edition of Abuja Bantaba honored 100 personalities for contributions to tourism development in Nigeria on 25 April 2014.

In 2013, he launched atqnews.com, the online version of African Travel Quarterly Magazine. According to Uko, it focuses on forecast, market, and political analyses of developments in travel, transport, and tourism from a global perspective and their impact on countries' economies.

On 3 July 2015, he launched Accra Weizo, an event related to the founding vision of ECOWAS: to create a region of integrated people growing together. Accra Weizo brings travel professionals together to determine a pathway for the future of the African region, hosting tourism, aviation, and immigration key players and decision makers.

In August 2015, he was appointed as the international tourism consultant to the Calabar Carnival.

Uko has proposed building an aviation museum for Nigeria using abandoned aircraft as exhibits, stating that the project would promote Nigeria's tourism, empower and educate a new generation of aviators, and draw international investors in the aviation industry to Nigeria.

== Awards and appointments ==
In 2008, he was appointed a member of the tourism committee Nigeria Vision 2020 in the administration of President Umaru Musa Yar'Adua.

In July 2014, Uko was chosen by the government of Rwanda as a namer at the 10th anniversary of Kwita Izina, the annual gorilla naming ceremony in Rwanda. In 2015, he was appointed consultant to the Calabar Carnival 2016 by the Cross River State governor, Prof. Ben Ayade, with the vision to reposition Calabar Carnival. As the international tourism consultant for the 2016 Calabar International Festival, Ikechi Uko brought in over 10 countries from various continents of the world to participate. He was reappointed in 2016 for the 2017 edition.

In January 2016, *The African Sun Times*, awarded Ikechi Uko as its Tourism Ambassador of the Year 2015. According to the organizers of the Award, it was earned by Ikechi's tourism promotion and development campaign in Nigeria and Africa through projects showcasing Africa.

At the 2017 MICE East Africa Forum and Expo held in Addis Ababa, Ethiopia, Ikechi Uko was presented with the 2016 MICE East Africa's Tourism and Hospitality Personality Award for his contributions towards developing tourism, travel, and hospitality businesses and investments in Africa.
