= List of Mughal travelers =

This is a list of the travellers who left accounts on Mughal Empire.

- Antonio Monserrate (1536-1600, from Spain)
- François Bernier (1625-1688, from France)
- Jean-Baptiste Tavernier (1605-1689, from France)
- Peter Mundy (1600-1667, from England)
- Seydi Ali Reis (1498 – 1563, from Turkey)
- Niccolao Manucci (1638-1717, from Venice)
