= Vyacheslav Krasko =

Vyacheslav Vasilyevich Krasko
- Born: 6 August 1974; Leningrad
- Other names: Vyacheslav Krasko
- Known for: traveler, top manager and professional financier

Vyacheslav Vasilyevich Krasko (Russian: Вячеслáв Васильевич Крaськó) (born 6 August 1974 in Leningrad, Soviet Union) is a Russian traveler, top manager and professional financier with a PhD Economics. Member of the Union of Russian Around-the-World Travelers.

== Life and education ==
Krasko graduated St. Petersburg State University of Economics and Finance, with a specialty in "World Economy". He continued his education in France at the Economic University of Paris IX-Dauphine with the specialty "Management of public and private enterprises".

From 1993 to 1999 he held main posts in the leading Russian banks, and from 1999 to 2010 he was a Financial Director in some large Russian companies.

At the beginning of April 2010 he gave up the work of Financial Director and traveled around the world. When he returned in 2011, he was invited in the Union of Russian Around-the-World Travelers and founded his touristic company “The Year of Spring” (Russian: Год весны).

On 10 October 2012 Krasko became the winner of the international photo-competition “People of India” in Naggar (the Kullu District of Himachal Pradesh, India).

Vyacheslav continues to travel: he has been to many places of local conflicts and ecological disasters. In 2013 he’s planning to make a journey entitled, “Ruta del Che” (“The way of Che Guevara”), by motorcycle in South America along the route of Ernesto Che Guevara, and has begun creating a feature-length fictional film, “The Year of Spring” (Russian: Год весны).

== The Year of Spring: travel and book ==
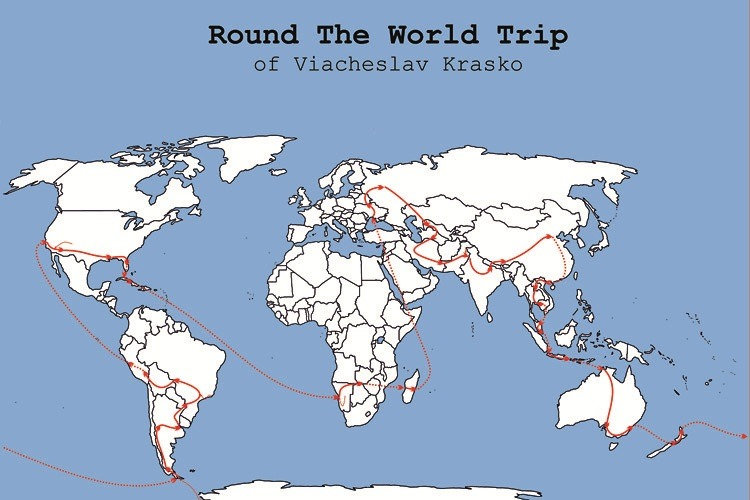
Round the world trip of Vyacheslav Krasko

His first travel round the world began April 2010 in Asia and lasted 407 days.

Beginning he flew from Moscow, he flew to Uzbekistan, then to the East, followed by going South to Australia, then to South America and North America; from North America he crossed the Atlantic Ocean to Africa, then he went across Africa and through the European countries he came back to Moscow. In total Vyacheslav visited 6 continents, 36 countries and 145 towns and cities, overcoming 137 000 km. The budget of the travel was 33 thousand U.S. dollars. The movements of the traveler were watched by a large number of people on-line at his website.

At the end of the journey Vyacheslav decided to come back to his homeland in order to share his new knowledge with others. His desire to share paired with the wishes of many people prompted him to publish a book about the project, in which everyone could feel the emotions and impressions of the traveler.

It was completed in Sarankot – a small village near Pokhara (Nepal), which is situated 5000 ft above sea level. This book (The Year of Spring: The Travel What Lasts a Year) is not a novel, autobiography, or itinerary. It is a collection of stories of wanderings that touches on remembrance, love, exotic landscapes, amazing feelings, thoughts, excerpts of lovely books, the life’s hard mountain climb and descent into the depths of one’s own soul. Critics describe the main driving force of the book and basis of all Vyacheslav Krasko’s travels to be freedom and happiness.

== See also ==
- Travel
- List of circumnavigations
- Adventure travel
- The Year of Spring: The Travel What Lasts a Year
