= Lei Diansheng =

Chinese explorer

Lei Diansheng (Chinese: 雷殿生) is a Chinese explorer who hiked a total distance of 81,000 km over ten years, covering all of China's provinces.

== Biography ==
Lei was born in Harbin, Heilongjiang Province. Both of his parents died when he was a child.

Inspired by the 17th-century travel writer Xu Xiake, Lei embarked on a decade-long hike throughout China, starting in October 1998 in Harbin and ending in October 2008 in Lop Nur, Xinjiang Province. He became the first person to traverse Lop Nur on foot alone. 1100km in 31 days with a backpack weight of 70kg.

In the last year of his journey, Lei carried the Olympic flame ahead of the 2008 Summer Olympics. Lei recorded his exploits in a book titled 十年徒步中国 (Ten Years of Hiking Across China).
