= Wacław Korabiewicz =

Polish physician and ethnographer

Wacław Korabiewicz (5 May 1903 – 15 February 1994) was a Polish physician and ethnographer. His reputation is that of writer, poet, traveller and collector of ethnographic material.

== Early life ==
Wacław Korabiewicz was born on 5 May 1903 in Saint Petersburg. He was the son of Antoni Korabiewicz and Stefania née Matusiewicz. He spent his childhood in Kiev and Kharkiv and on the family estate in Lithuania.

In the years 1927–1932 he studied medicine and ethnography at Stefan Batory University in Vilnius. While a student, he was co-founder and member of the Vilnius Academic Vagabonds Club. A fellow student at the time was the writer Czeslaw Milosz who commented about Korabiewicz's great height that it earned him the sobriquet, Kilometre. He made his début in the journal Reduta (Vilnius 1925), and had poems appear in poetry publications, including STO (Vilnius 1928), A stick in the sky (Vilnius, 1929) and in magazines such as "Alma Mater Vilnensis".

== Career and travels ==
In 1930, he travelled through Turkey and Greece by canoe. After graduation he worked as a doctor at the Polish Naval Academy in Gdynia. During the years 1931–1939 he was the ship doctor on the Dar Pomorza. From 1934 onwards, with his first wife, Janina M. Haazówna, he travelled to India. After the outbreak of World War II he was interned in Stockholm with the crew of the Dar Pomorza. He would not return to Poland for 20 years. After the war, he worked on the liner MS Piłsudski. He next lived in London where he was a founder of Circle for the Care of Veterans. He moved to São Paulo and Rio de Janeiro where he organized help for former Polish prisoners of war. In 1942, he participated in an expedition into the Brazilian jungle. From 1943 to 1946, he stayed in Africa, as a delegate of the Polish government-in-exile. While in Lusaka, he worked for the Polish Ministry of Social Welfare that had responsibility for Polish ex-prisoners in the camps of Northern Rhodesia. He had a similar role in Dar es Salaam, Tanzania. He worked as a deputy curator of the "King George V Memorial Museum", conducting research into folklore of the British territories in Africa and also in Mozambique. He also worked as a physician at a local hospital. In 1954, after sending a number of exhibition pieces to the Polish Museum of Folk Culture in Młociny, he was expelled from Tanganyika and stayed in London. Between 1954 - 1956 he was in Ethiopia, where he worked as a doctor.

In 1958, he returned to Poland. From 1959 to 1961, he went to Ghana as the head of an epidemiological programme. He returned to Warsaw in 1962. From that time he dedicated himself exclusively to writing. Between 1963 and 1976, he "forwarded" exhibition pieces to the National Museum in Warsaw. He organized exhibitions of their African art collections, including the exhibition "Masqual - The Cross of Ethiopia" at the National Museum, Warsaw, 1966. He travelled widely in Africa and in the Middle East. He settled in Natolin, a district of Warsaw.

== Death ==
Korabiewicz died on 15 February 1994 in Warsaw. After his death, the urn containing the ashes was buried in the Baltic Sea.

== Works ==
- Kajakiem do minaretów reportaż podróżniczy; Główna Księgarnia Wojskowa 1935; Wiedza Powszechna 1958)
- Mato Grosso. Z notatek wypychacza ptaków reportaż podróżniczy; Horyzont 1948; jako Mato Grosso: Czytelnik 1959, 1968, 1989, ISBN 83-07-01818-8, seria: „Z żaglem"
- Bajki dla dorosłych poezje; Oficyna Poetów i Malarzy, 1953
- Kwaheri reportaż podróżniczy; Iskry 1958, 1960, 1965
- Safari Mingi. Wędrówki po Afryce reportaż podróżniczy; Czytelnik 1959, Iskry 1963,
- Żaglem do jogów reportaż podróżniczy; Ludowa Spółdzielnia Wydawnicza 1960, Sport i Turystyka 1984, ISBN 83-217-2429-9
- Midimo. Romans afrykański powieść; Czytelnik 1961, ISBN 83-07-00903-0
- Eskulap w Etiopii reportaż podróżniczy; Ludowa Spółdzielnia Wydawnicza 1963; wydanie zmienione pt.: Słońce na ambach, Iskry 1970, seria: "Naokoło świata"
- Zwierzaki opowiadania dla dzieci; Nasza Księgarnia 1965, ISBN 83-10-09158-3
- Boa-dusiciel (osobne wydanie jednego z opowiadań tomu Zwierzaki: Ruch 1966)
- Sztuka Afryki w zbiorach polskich fotografie Zdzisław Małek; Wydawnictwo Polonia 1966; in English: African art in Polish collections, Polonia Publishing House 1966; French edition: L'art de l'Afrique noire dans les collections polonais, Polonia 1966)
- Święty krokodyl - opowiadanie dla dzieci; Ruch 1966
- Do Timbuktu - reportaż podróżniczy; Iskry 1967; seria: "Naokoło świata"
- Kajakiem do Indii nowe opracowanie dwóch wcześniej wydanych książek: Kajakiem do minaretów i Żaglem do jogów; Iskry 1972; seria: "Naokoło świata"
- The Ethiopian cross album; Holy Trinity Cathedral, Addis Abeba, 1973
- Rapsod o głowie hetmana poemat; Wydawnictwo MON 1973, ISBN 83-11-07381-3
- Złowiłem życie autobiografia; Iskry 1973], 1977; seria: "Łowcy sensacji"
- Śladami amuletu studium; Arkady 1974
- Krzyż koptyjski i jego naśladownictwa: kolekcja Wacława Korabiewicza - Le croix copte et son évolution: collection Wacław Korabiewicz (oprac. katalog wystawy; trans. into French: Zsolt Kiss; Muzeum Narodowe w Warszawie. Galeria Sztuki Faras 1976
- Dobry simba - Reportaże podróżnicze; wybór tekstów z książek: Kwaheri, Midimo, Safari Mingi, Eskulap w Etiopii, Słońce na ambach, Do Timbuktu, Złowiłem życie; Iskry 1979; seria: "Biblioteka Literatury Faktu"
- Gdzie słoń a gdzie Polska pamiętniki; Wydawnictwo MON 1980, ISBN 83-11-06494-6; 1983, ISBN 83-11-06494-6)
- Wiara leczy. Rzecz o dziwnych lekach, szkice popularnonaukowe; Veritas 1982
- Serce na dłoniach. Opowieść biograficzna o Walerii Sikorzynie Komitet Uczczenia Pamięci Walerii Sikorzyny, Londyn 1984, Wydawnictwo Marek Rożak, ISBN 83-86608-35-8
- Pokusy wspomnienia; Iskry 1986, ISBN 83-207-0834-6)
- Cuda bez cudu. Rzecz o dziwnych lekach - Ludowa Spółdzielnia Wydawnicza 1988, ISBN 83-205-3846-7; ISBN 83-205-3846-7)
- Inne drogi Jezusa. O czym milczy Kościół - Kwartet 1992; wydanie pod innym tytułem: Tajemnica młodości i śmierci Jezusa, Przedświt 1992
- Wiersze niemodne poezje; Klucz 1992, ISBN 83-900274-2-9)
- Z "Daru Pomorza" na ... bezdroża - opowiadania; Wyższa Szkoła Morska 1993, ISBN 83-900838-4-1)
