= Marten Douwes Teenstra =

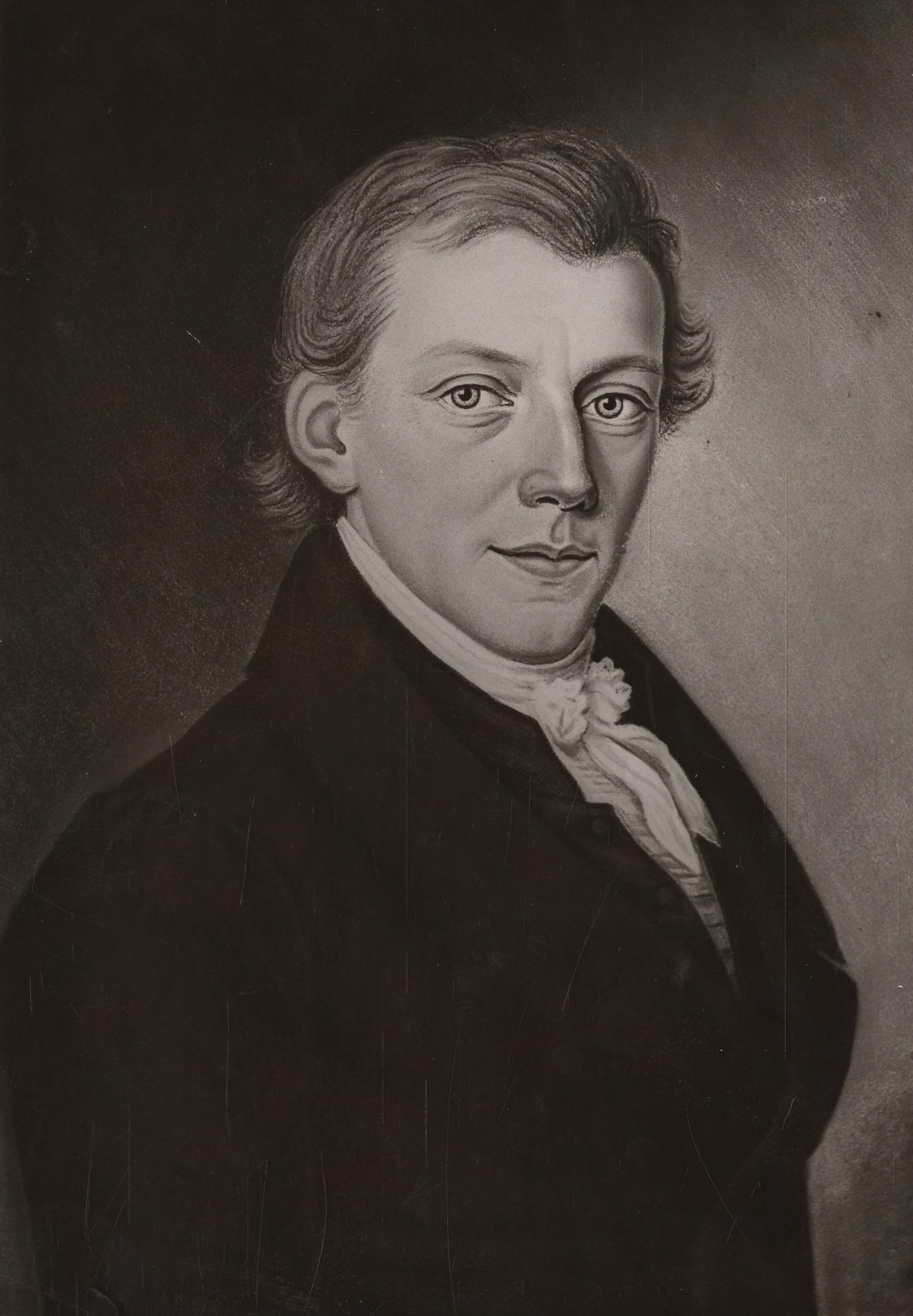
- Born: 17 September 1795; Ruigezand, Groningen
- Died: 29 October 1864 (aged 69); Ulrum
- Occupation: writer
- Known for: Travels in South Africa and the Dutch East Indies

Marten Douwes Teenstra (17 September 1795 Het Ruigezand, Groningen - 29 October 1864 Ulrum) was a Dutch writer and traveller in the southern parts of the African continent and the Dutch East Indies. The account of his stay at the Cape from 12 March to 7 July 1825, "De vruchten mijner werkzaamheden" (fruits of my labours), was a thorough description of his trip, rich in interesting detail of the personalities and places he came across, and thoughtful commentary on the social, political and economic life of the Cape colony.

Despite this being his first published attempt at writing, the artless manner in which he set down his observations on language, habits and customs, modes of transport, farming practices and the appearance of the countryside, must rank this as one of the finest travelogues on the Cape. Besides trying the restorative waters of the Caledon baths, he visited Genadendal Mission, Franschhoek and Stellenbosch.

Teenstra belonged to a prosperous Groninger farming family of Frisian descent, and was the son of Douwe Martens Teenstra and Jantje Luies Dijkhuis. In 1819 his father bought him the 100ha farm "Arion" for the sum of 100 000 guilders. The collapsing agricultural market caused widespread financial losses, and led to his 1824 decision to temporarily abandon farming, his wife and his children, and to leave for Java aboard a swift frigate named "Abel Tasman".

Life aboard the ship was comfortable with excellent fare, often consisting of seven or eight dishes, wine, music and singing after supper, and the odd game of cards, checkers or chess. In the equatorial latitudes, though, the heat was oppressive, especially at night, when the mingled odours of cheese, ham and unwashed bodies from the hold, forced passengers to sleep on deck. Teenstra, together with 33 others who had not crossed the equator previously, were subjected to the ceremony of "crossing the line".

After a voyage lasting sixty-one days via Madeira, the Canary Islands and Trinidad, their ship anchored in Table Bay on 11 March 1825. Teenstra was feeling decidedly unwell, a condition he put down to a freak squall's having drenched him while he was enjoying a bath. In this fragile state he spent a few weeks in the company of his landlady, Miss Truter and her family members, who by horse and buggy introduced him to Cape Town and the Peninsula.

His next letter was dated 1 May 1825 and was written from Caledon, a source of mineral-rich hot springs where he "took the waters" on the advice of his doctor, his ship having left for Batavia while he underwent an enforced convalescence.

Teenstra returned to his family in 1826 and soon realised that agricultural prospects had not improved during his absence. Consequently he sold his farm and moved to Baflo with his family, from where he wrote most of his travel books. Again, he found himself in financial trouble and in 1828 moved to Surinam, at that time one of the Dutch colonies. Here he became an agricultural advisor and was soon appointed as inspector of bridges, roads and waterworks. Over this period his wife and children were living in Ulrum in a house built by his mother-in-law.

Teenstra returned to the Netherlands in 1834, bought a house in Ulrum and settled in to write, producing children's, travel and history books, and establishing two magazines. He attended the Mennonite church and was a member of the Freemasons.

== Books by Teenstra ==
- De landbouw in de kolonie Suriname : voorafgegaan door eene geschied- en natuurkundige beschouwing dier kolonie (1835)
- De Nederlandsche West-Indische Eilanden (1836) ISBN 9781143971037
- De Negerslaven in de Kolonie Suriname en de Uitbreiding van het Christendom Onder de Heidensche Bevolking (1842)
- Nederlandse Volksverhalen 1 & 2 (1843)
- Beknopte beschrijving van de Nederlandsche overzeesche bezittingen voor beschaafde lezers uit alle standen, uit de beste bronnen en eigen ervaring in Oost- en West-Indiën geput (1850)
- Hans Hannekemaaier
- De kinderwereld ernst en luim. Ontleend uit de spelen van kleine en groote kinderen door hunnen speelmakker
- Stads- en dorpkroniek Groningen, Friesland en Drente
- Chronologisch overzicht van 1795–1815 voor Groningen, Friesland en Drente
- Ulrum zoals het is en destijds toenemende volksbewegingen in Oktober 1834
- De vruchten mijner werkzaamheden
- Volksverhalen en Legenden van vroegere en latere dagen, uit meest Nederlandsche schrijvers en mondelinge mededeelingen verzameld. Eerste stuk: Spookverschijningen
- Volksvooroordeelen En Bijgeloof
