= Bibliography of world history (field) =

Bibliography of world history (field).

== Authors and their books on world history ==
- Christopher Bayly, The Birth of the Modern World: Global Connections and Comparisons, 1780–1914 (London, 2004)
- Jerry Bentley, (1949–2012) Founder and editor of the Journal of World History
- Jacques Bertin, Atlas historique universel. Panorama de l'histoire du monde, Geneva, Minerva, 1997
- Fernand Braudel, (1903–1985) Civilisation matérielle, économie et capitalisme (Paris, 1973, 3 vols.); English translation, Civilization and Capitalism, 15th–18th Centuries, translated by Siân Reynolds, 3 vols. (1979)
- Philip D. Curtin (1922–2009), The World and the West: The European Challenge and the Overseas Response in the Age of Empire. (2000) 308 pp. ISBN 978-0-521-77135-1. online review
- Christopher Dawson (1889–1970) Religion and the Rise of Western Culture (1950) excerpt and text search
- Will Durant (1885–1981) and Ariel Durant (1898–1981); The Story of Civilization (1935–1975).
- Friedrich Engels (1820–1895), The Origin of the Family, Private Property and the State (Zurich, 1884)
- Felipe Fernandez-Armesto (b. 1950), "Millennium" (1995), "Civilizations" (2000), "The World" (2007).
- Francis Fukuyama (1952– ) The End of History and the Last Man (1992)
- Samuel P. Huntington (1927 - 2008) The Clash of Civilizations and the Remaking of World Order (1996)
- Georg Wilhelm Friedrich Hegel (1770–1830), philosopher of world history
- Akira Iriye, Global and Transnational History: The Past, Present, and Future (2012)
- Peter Kropotkin (1842–1921), The State: Its Historic Role (London, 1896)
- Patrick Manning, Navigating World History: Historians Create a Global Past (2003)
- William Hardy McNeill (born 1917); see especially The Rise of the West: A History of the Human Community (1963)
- Robert McNeill and William H. McNeill. The Human Web: A Bird's-Eye View of World History (2003) excerpt and text search
- Jawaharlal Nehru (1889–1964), Glimpses of World History (1930–1933)
- Diego Olstein, (2021) A Brief History of Now: The Past and Present of Global Power
- Jürgen Osterhammel, The Transformation of the World: A Global History of the Nineteenth Century (2014) excerpt
- Carroll Quigley (1910–1977), The Evolution of Civilizations (1961), Tragedy and Hope: A History of the World in Our Time (1966), Weapons Systems and Political Stability: A History (1983)
- Pitirim Sorokin (1889–1968), Russian-American macrosociology; Social and Cultural Dynamics (4 vol., 1937–41)
- Oswald Spengler (1880–1936), German; The Decline of the West (1918–22) vol 1 online; vol 2 online; excerpt and text search, abridged edition
- Peter Stearns, (1936–) USA; World History in Brief: Major Patterns of Change and Continuity, 7th ed. (2009); Encyclopedia of World History, 6th ed. (200pp)
- Luc-Normand Tellier, Canadian; Urban World History, PUQ, (2009), 650 pages; online edition
- Arnold J. Toynbee, British; A Study of History (1934–61)
- Eric Voegelin (1901–1985) Order and History (1956–85)
- Immanuel Wallerstein, World-systems theory
- Giano Rocca, "The Ultimate Meaning of Human Existence - The Scientific Method Applied to the Human Condition - Book I" (2016)

== Surveys of world history ==
- Bayly, Christopher Alan. The birth of the modern world, 1780–1914: global connections and comparisons (Blackwell, 2004)
- Bullet, Richard et al., The Earth and Its Peoples 6th ed. (2 vol, 2014), university textbook
- Duiker, William J. Duiker and Jackson J. Spielvogel. World History (2 vol 2006), university textbook
- Dupuy, R. Ernest and Trevor N. Dupuy. The Encyclopedia of Military History: From 3500 B.C. to the Present (1977), 1465 pp; comprehensive discussion focused on wars and battles
- Gombrich, Ernst. A Little History of the World (1936 & 1995)
- Grenville, J.A.S. A History of the World: From the 20th to the 21st Century (2005)
- Lee, Wayne E. Waging War: Conflict, Culture, and Innovation in World History (2015) excerpt
- McKay, John P. and Bennett D. Hill. A History of World Societies (2 vol. 2011), university textbook
- McNeill, William H. A World History (1998), University textbook
- McNeill, William H., Jerry H. Bentley, and David Christian, eds. Berkshire Encyclopedia Of World History (5 vol 2005)
- Osterhammel, Jürgen. The Transformation of the World: A Global History of the Nineteenth Century (Princeton University Press, 2014), 1167pp
- Paine, Lincoln. The sea and civilization: a maritime history of the world (Knopf, 2013). Pp. xxxv+ 744. 72 illustrations, 17 maps. excerpt
- Roberts, J. M. and O. A. Westad. The History of the World (2013)
- Rosenberg, Emily, et al. eds. A World Connecting: 1870–1945 (2012)
- Stearns, Peter N. ed. Oxford Encyclopedia of the Modern World: 1750 to the Present (8 vol. 2008)
- Stearns, Peter N. (1998). The Industrial Revolution in World History. Archived from the original on 2009-09-07 – via Questia.
- Szulc, Tad. Then and Now: How the World Has Changed since W.W. II. (1990). 515 p. ISBN 0-688-07558-4; Popular history
- Tignor, Robert, et al. Worlds Together, Worlds Apart: A History of the World (4th ed, 2 vol. 2013), University textbook
- Watt, D. C., Frank Spencer, Neville Brown. A History of the World in the Twentieth Century (1967)

== Transnational histories ==
- Adam, Thomas. Intercultural Transfers and the Making of the Modern World, 1800–2000: Sources and Contexts (2011)
- Boon, Marten. "Business Enterprise and Globalization: Towards a Transnational Business History." Business History Review 91.3 (2017): 511–535.
- Davies, Thomas Richard. NGOs: A new history of transnational civil society (2014).
- Ember, Carol R. Melvin Ember, and Ian A. Skoggard, eds. Encyclopedia of diasporas: immigrant and refugee cultures around the world (2004).
- Iriye, Akira. Global and Transnational History: The Past, Present, and Future (2010), 94pp
- Iriye, Akira and Pierre-Yves Saunier, eds. The Palgrave Dictionary of Transnational History: From the mid-19th century to the present day (2009); 1232pp; 400 entries by scholars.
- Osterhammel, Jürgen and Niels P. Petersson. Globalization: A Short History (2009)
- Pieke Frank N., Nyíri Pál, Thunø Mette, and Ceddagno Antonella. Transnational Chinese: Fujianese migrants in Europe (2004)
- Saunier, Pierre-Yves. Transnational History (2013)

== Atlases ==
- Barraclough, Geoffrey, ed. The Times Atlas of World History (1979).
- Catchpole, Brian. Map History of the Modern World (1982)
- Darby, H. C., and H. Fullard, eds. The New Cambridge Modern History, Vol. 14: Atlas (1970)
- Haywood, John. Atlas of world history (1997) online free
- Kinder, Hermann and Werner Hilgemann. Anchor Atlas of World History (2 vol. 1978); advanced analytical maps, mostly of Europe
- O'Brian, Patrick. Atlas of World History (2010). excerpt
- Rand McNally. Historical atlas of the world (1997) online free
- Santon, Kate, and Liz McKay, eds. Atlas of World History (2005).

== Historiography ==
- Adas, Michael. Essays on Twentieth-Century History (2010); historiographic essays on world history conceptualizing the "long" 20th century, from the 1870s to the early 2000s.
- Allardyce, Gilbert. "Toward world history: American historians and the coming of the world history course." Journal of World History 1.1 (1990): 23–76.
- Bentley, Jerry H., ed. The Oxford Handbook of World History (Oxford University Press, 2011)
- Costello, Paul. World Historians and Their Goals: Twentieth-Century Answers to Modernism (1993).
- Curtin, Philip D. "Depth, Span, and Relevance," The American Historical Review, Vol. 89, No. 1 (Feb., 1984), pp. 1–9 in JSTOR
- Dunn, Ross E., ed. The New World History: A Teacher's Companion. (2000). 607pp. ISBN 978-0-312-18327-1 online review
- Frye, Northrop. "Spengler Revisited" in Northrop Frye on modern culture (2003), pp 297–382, first published 1974; online
- Hare, J. Laurence, and Jack Wells. "Promising the World: Surveys, Curricula, and the Challenge of Global History," History Teacher, 48 (Feb. 2015) pp: 371–88. online
- Hughes-Warrington, Marnie (2005). Palgrave Advances in World Histories. New York: Palgrave MacMillan. p. 286. ISBN 9780230523401. articles by scholars
- Lang, Michael. "Globalization and Global History in Toynbee," Journal of World History 22#4 Dec. 2011 pp. 747–783 in project MUSE
- McInnes, Neil. "The Great Doomsayer: Oswald Spengler Reconsidered." National Interest 1997 (48): 65–76. ISSN 0884-9382 Fulltext: Ebsco
- McNeill, William H. "The Changing Shape of World History." History and Theory 1995 34(2): 8–26. ISSN 0018-2656 in JSTOR
- Manning, Patrick. Navigating World History: Historians Create a Global Past (2003), an important guide to the entire field excerpt and text search; online review
- Mazlish, Bruce. "Comparing Global History to World History," Journal of Interdisciplinary History, Vol. 28, No. 3 (Winter, 1998), pp. 385–395 in JSTOR
- Moore, Robert I. "World history." in Michael Bentley, ed., Companion to historiography (1997): 941–59.
- National Center for History in the Schools at UCLA. World History: The Big Eras, A Compact History of Humankind (2009), 96pp
- Neiberg, Michael S. Warfare in World History (2001) online edition
- Patel, Klaus Kiran: Transnational History, European History Online, Mainz: Institute of European History(2011) retrieved: November 11, 2011.
- Richards, Michael D. (2003). Revolutions in World History. Archived from the original on 2009-09-07 – via Questia.
- Roupp, Heidi, ed. (1997). Teaching World History: A Resource Book. Archived from the original on 2008-03-23 – via Questia.
- Sachsenmaier, Dominic, "Global Perspectives on Global History" (2011), Cambridge UP
- Smil, Vaclav (1994). Energy in World History. Archived from the original on 2009-09-07 – via Questia.
- Tellier, Luc-Normand. Urban World History (2009), PUQ, 650 pages; online edition
- Watts, Sheldon (2003). Disease and Medicine in World History. Archived from the original on 2008-10-17 – via Questia.
