= Black Cargoes: A History of the Atlantic Slave Trade 1518–1865 =

1962 book by Daniel P. Mannix

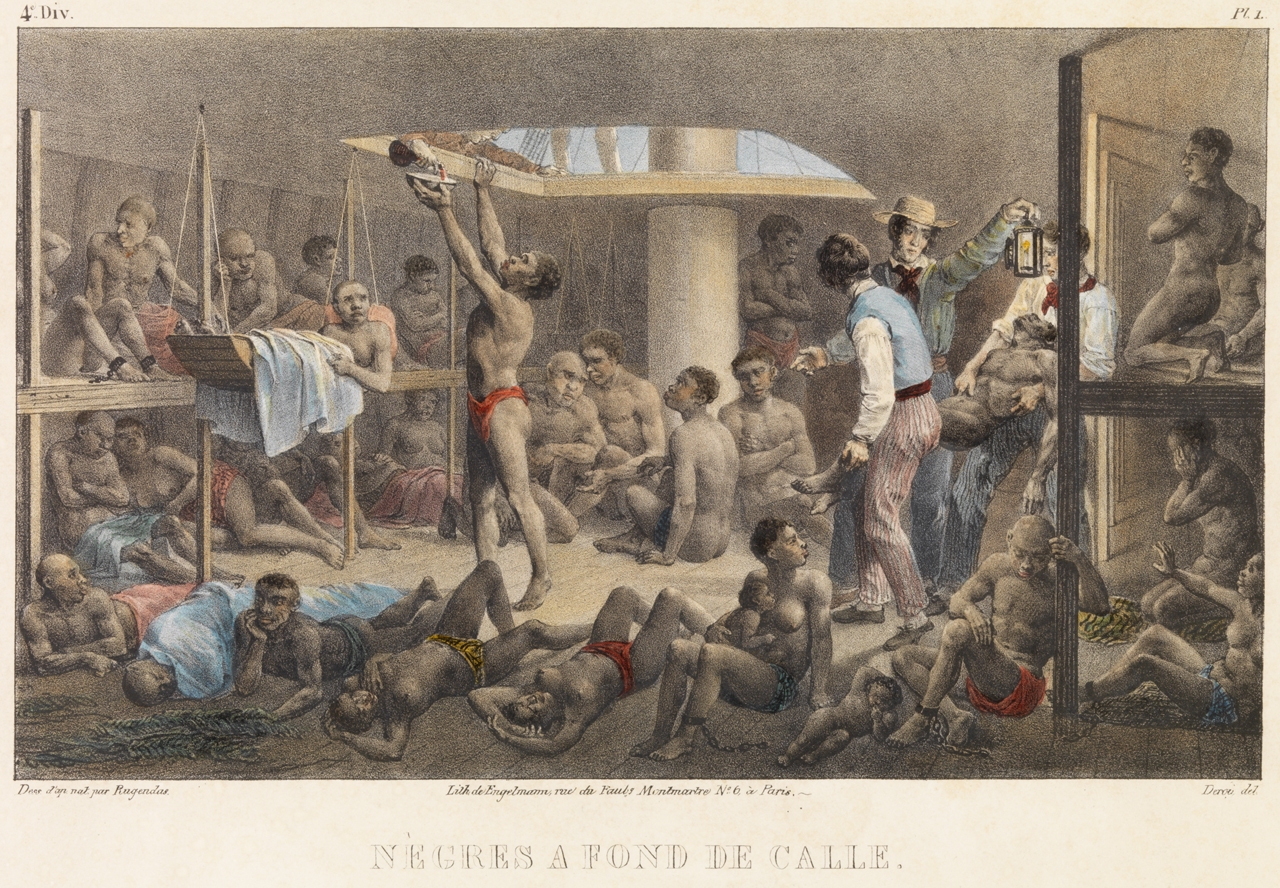
- Print by Johann Moritz Rugendas used on the dust cover of Black Cargoes.
- Author: Daniel P. Mannix in collaboration with Malcolm Cowley
- Language: English
- Genre: History
- Published: 1962
- Publisher: Viking Press
- Publication place: United States
- Media type: Print (hardcover)
- Pages: 306 pp

Black Cargoes: A History of the Atlantic Slave Trade 1518–1865 (referred to below as Black Cargoes) by Daniel P. Mannix in collaboration with Malcolm Cowley was published in 1962 during the civil rights movement in the United States prior to the passage of the Civil Rights Act of 1964. It was the first book on the Atlantic slave trade since The American Slave Trade: An Account of Its Origin, Growth and Suppression published in 1900 by John Randolph Spears. It had a narrative format and was widely recognized in the popular press at the time including Time magazine and the New York Times and was praised in academic articles. The New York Times review indicated that its subject had "special current overtones". One of the chapters, The Middle Passage was published separately in American Heritage magazine, also in 1962.

== Earlier histories ==
The introduction of Black Cargoes by Cowley characterized Spears's 1900 book The American Slave Trade (the last full-length book on the topic copyrighted prior to Black Cargoes) as short and moralistic. It was dedicated to "All who sincerely strive to understand and obey the divine command Thou shalt love thy neighbor as thyself"; although, at 294 pages, it might not be considered short. It was also infused with views about race prevalent at the time. For example, it included the line, "Because the white men were superior in a variety of ways the black men received them with joy, and opened traffic at once". It also touted the "pluck" of some slave ship captains and posited that slave-ship experience was helpful in developing American sea power. In this regard, he cited the experience of John Paul Jones (the American naval Revolutionary War hero) on the slave ship, King George. Even in a discussion of the degraded action of slavers there was a condescending tone: "And degradation is the inevitable fate of everyone who deliberately ignores justice in his treatment of inferiors. Get rich he may, but be degraded hell-low he shall be" [emphasis added].

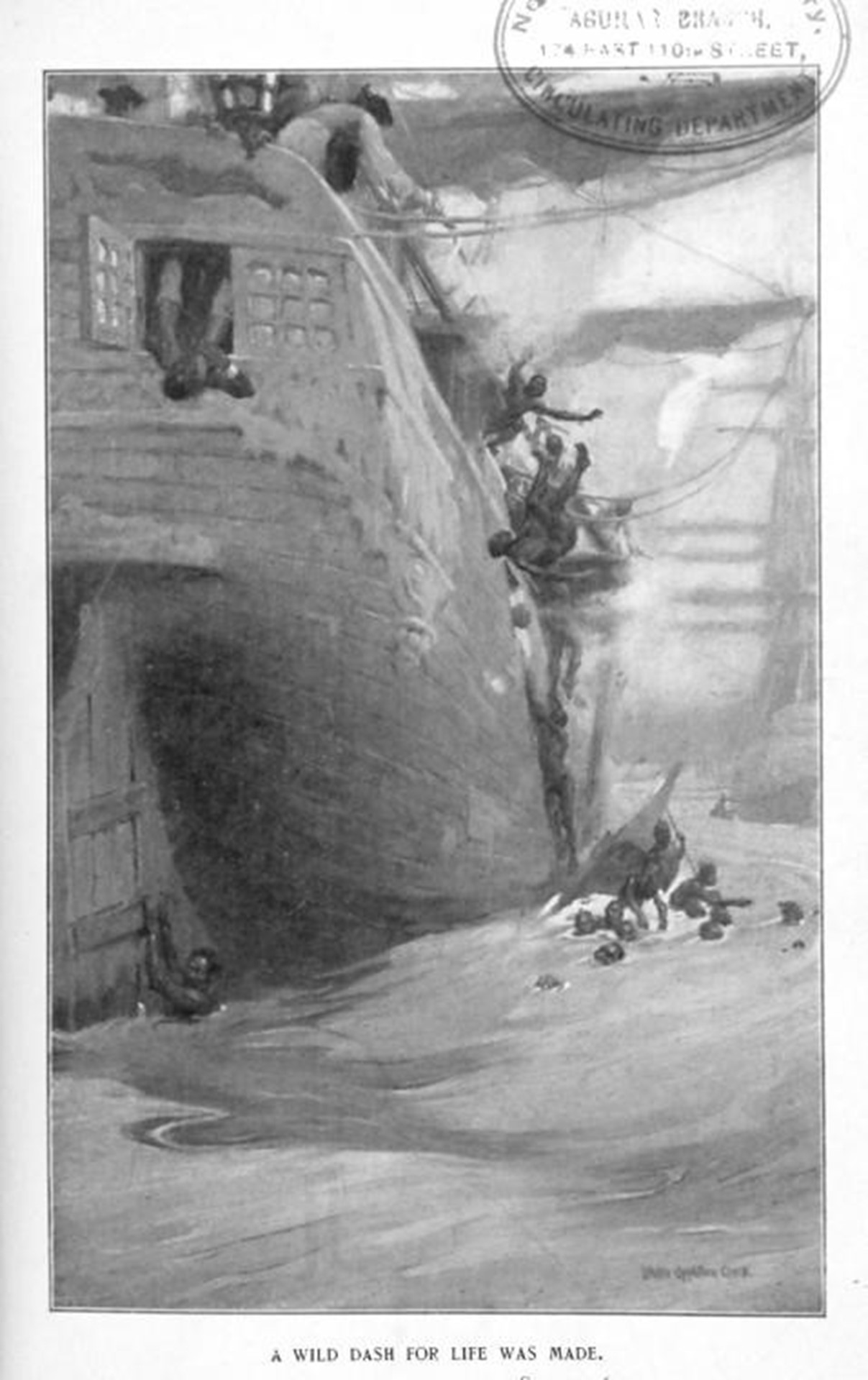
Illustration by Walter Appleton Clark captioned "A wild dash for life was made." for The American Slave Trade by John R. Spears, C. Scribner's Sons, 1900

The obvious biases aside, W. E. B. Du Bois commented that "Its tone is high and the general impression given is a true one". On the other hand, he noted that "There is a dangerous blending of history and fiction in the book that makes the reader not always certain of his ground". While Black Cargoes was also narrative, Spears's book often included longer stories and quotations. It also included original illustrations by Walter Appleton Clark, which depicted action sequences. For example, the figure captioned, "A wild dash for life was made." depicts the treacherous slaughter of villagers who the slavers had invited on board the ship, Duke of York, for talk and drink. On a prearranged signal, the slavers suddenly took up arms against them. The villagers that fled in a wild dash for life were captured by men from a rival village with whom the captain had made a secret pact. Spears devoted several pages to the gripping story, which was not included in Black Cargoes. Mannix and Cowley include many historical illustrations, but most of these have a loose connection to the text.

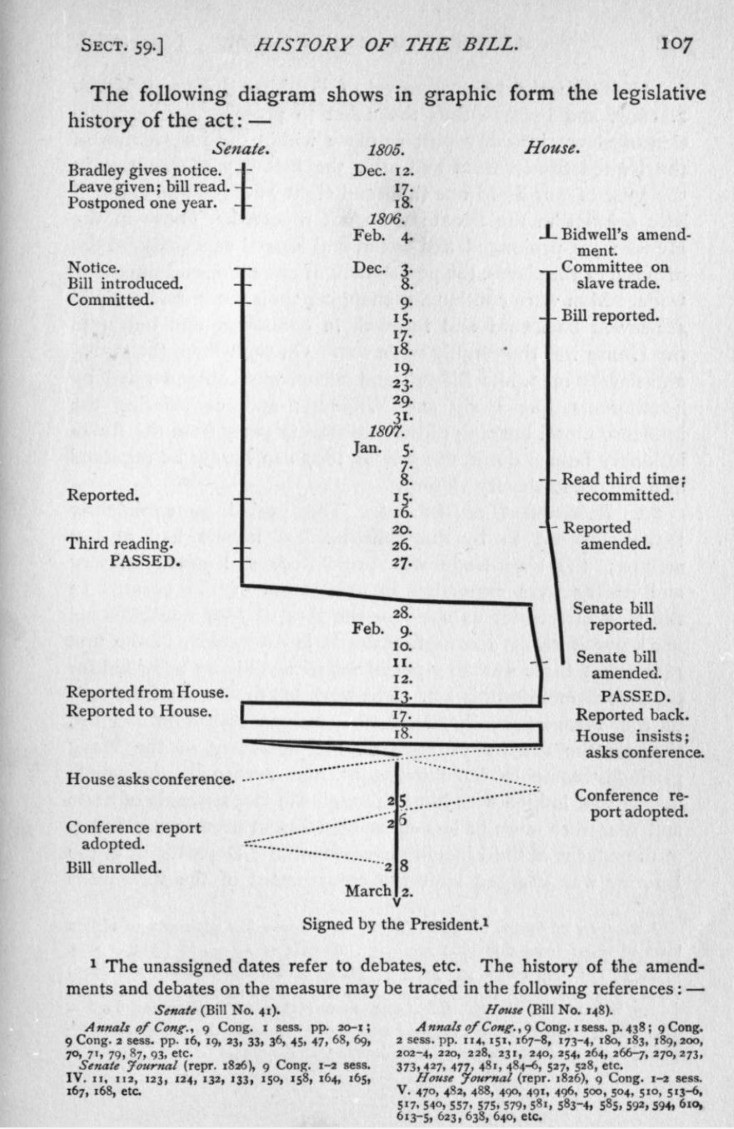
Diagram by W. E. B. Du Bois for his book "The Suppression of the African Slave-Trade to the United States of America, 1638–1870" that illustrates the legislative history of the Act of 1807 that banned slave trade, Longmans, 1896.

Spears acknowledged an earlier history from 1896 by W. E. B. Du Bois, The Suppression of the African Slave-trade to the United States of America as one of his primary sources, although their books could not be more different. Du Bois based his account on his PhD thesis at Harvard University and it is still considered a standard on the topic. As such it has been republished by the Louisiana State University with an introduction by John Hope Franklin in 1970, and by Oxford University with an introduction by Saidiya Hartman in 2014. The Oxford edition was part of a project to republish Du Bois's major works as a series and it includes the series introduction by Henry Louis Gates Jr.

Du Bois intended his account to be "a small contribution to the scientific study of slavery and the American Negro". Du Bois kept his account matter of fact, data driven, and almost entirely without emotion, although in her introduction, Saidya Hartman commented that he later used a less disengaged style of writing. Du Bois mainly focused on the political debates about the slave trade in the United States and the various, mostly ineffective, legislative attempts to suppress it.

Each chapter was preceded by a precise list of contents. There were no illustrations except for a diagram that illustrated the legislative history of the Act of 1807 (effective in 1808), which banned the importation of slaves to the United States. He included long quotations from debates. For example, he devoted a full page to quote a speech by Peter Early, a representative from Georgia, arguing that African captives brought illegally to the United States after the effective date should be sold and not set free. Early concluded that if such a law were enacted, "The whole people will rise up against it. Why? Because to enforce it would be to turn loose, in the bosom of the country, firebrands that would consume them." As indicated by the title, his book was primarily restricted to the slave trade to the United States and was far more detailed on the political aspects of that than Mannix and Cowley.

== Contents and attribution ==
Black Cargoes has the following numbered chapter headings:

1. The Beginnings
2. Slaving in the Seventeenth Century
3. The Early American Trade
4. Flush Times on the Guinea Coast
5. The Middle Passage
6. Captains and Crews
7. The Yankee Slavers
8. The Fight to Abolish the Trade
9. Contraband
10. The Roaring Eighteen-Forties
11. Slave Catching in the Indian Ocean
12. The Dream of a Slave Empire

Cowley stated that Black Cargoes was Mannix's book, and his role was chiefly editorial. However, he had been preparing to write a book that was never published, and his material was included. He noted that he accepted primary responsibility for chapters 5, 7, and 12. The Middle Passage was published separately in American Heritage, a hardcover magazine, in 1962. The title page had the heading, "Packed like animals in the holds of ships, Negros bound for America were prey to disease, brutal masters, and their own suicidal melancholy. Such was the fearful MIDDLE PASSAGE".

== Narrative ==
In contrast to Spears, Mannix and Cowley were respectful of African culture: "There were kingdoms and commonwealths comparable in size with many European nations, and even the smaller tribes had definite and often complex cultures . . . Many of their communities had highly involved religions, well-organized economic systems, efficient agricultural practices, and admirable codes of law. We have only in recent years begun to appreciate West Africa's contribution to sculpture, folk literature, and music". In contrast to Du Bois, their account was emotive. It had no quotations of long political speeches, but rather focused on narratives of slave ship captains and crews.

Black Cargoes begins with Christopher Columbus and the brutal suppression of a revolt by Indians. As recounted in a Time magazine review, the black slave trade to the Americas ironically began as a humanitarian effort. Colonist in Hispaniola had attempted to enslave the Indians but they were not suited to the work, which led to "thousands of Indians dying in corrals, and scores of men and women burned alive in the hope that their fate would induce the others to work" (Mannix's description). In 1515, moved by the suffering of the Indians, a priest Bartolomé de las Casas, petitioned Charles V, Holy Roman Emperor, to import slaves from Africa to relieve the suffering of the Indians. His request was granted, although the motive for granting the request may have been at least partially economic. In 1518, 4000 African slaves were sent to the island.

According to Mannix and Cowley, in the 16th century, slavers were unapologetic—slavery was just an accepted practice. It was justified on the basis of religion. Africans were seen as benefiting by conversion to Christianity. The "racial excuse was seldom used". The racial aspect surfaced in the 17th century. Initially in Virginia, for example, "Negros had been regarded as servants indentured for life, their children were born free and were also reared in the true faith". However, in many cases planters refused to let them go. So they came up with a new excuse based on race and the Christian bible. They argued that the Negros were the children of Ham or Cannan and claimed that slavery was a biblical practice based on Noah's curse: "And he said, Cursed be Canaan; a servant of servants shall he be unto his brethren” (Genesis IX, 25). Some slave owners even claimed that Negros were not human and so could not become Christian.

According to Mannix and Cowley, the slave trade then blossomed and continued essentially unabated for nearly three centuries. However, in 1807, Britain and the United States passed legislation banning the slave trade. Britain launched a naval blockade to suppress the trade by all nations. The British policy came about largely through the moral advocacy of William Wilberforce in parliament. Unfortunately, the blockade was thwarted by the United States, which refused to allow their ships to be searched. Even though it was technically illegal, the U.S. government did not enforce the ban and it became a major transporter of slaves to the New World. Demand for imported slaves had previously dampened following the Haitian Revolution, during which white plantation owners were slaughtered in 1804. The authors claimed that all states south of Maryland feared a slave rebellion, nevertheless the fear was later overcome by greed. They concluded (as did Du Bois before them) that the invention of the cotton gin in 1828, which made the processing of cotton far more efficient, led to a vast expansion of cotton plantations and the need for more slaves. Also according to Du Bois slavery was changing from a "family institution to an industrial system".

Although Rhode Island was not highlighted by Mannix and Cowley, it became the center of the American slave trade in the 18th century. A triangular trading route was developed. Small "clippers" were loaded with rum distilled in Rhode Island. Mannix and Cowley described them as the "whippets of the sea" (rather than greyhounds). The fast ships were able to elude the British patrols and sail further up African rivers than larger ships. It also allowed the slavers to load a shipment of slaves quickly so as to reduce sickness among the crew and slaves alike. They then sailed to the West Indies where slaves were exchanged from molasses, which was carried back to Rhode Island to make more rum, which could be sold at a profit and used for further trade. In a treatise on the subject Jay Coughtry concluded that this scenario was correct in outline however he noted that "Returning slavers, however, did not carry enough syrup to supply even the local African fleet with sufficient rum for the first leg of the slaving voyages, let alone furnish a surplus for domestic consumption and coastwise exports".

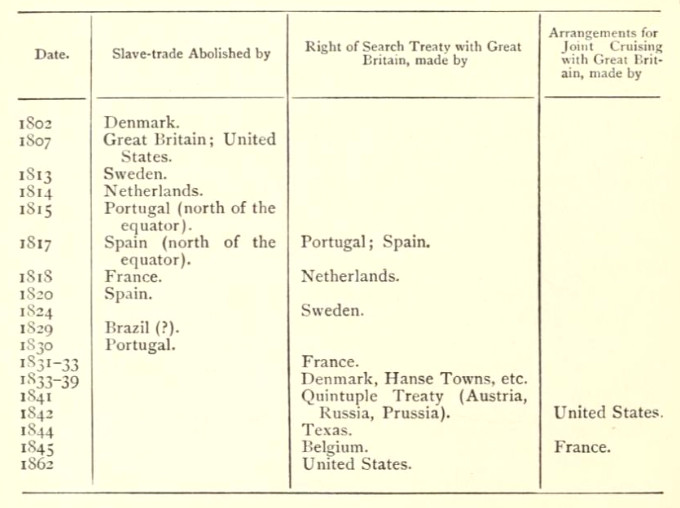
Table by W. E. B. Du Bois for his book "The Suppression of the African Slave-Trade to the United States of America, 1638–1870" that shows bans by countries and treaty agreements to suppress the slave trade, Longmans, 1896.

As noted earlier, Du Bois approached his history of the suppression of the slave trade more systematically than in the colorful Mannix and Cowley narrative. He included a table showing the passage of laws of countries banning the trade and the implementation of treaties which allowed the British (which had taken over the role of "policeman of the seas") to actually enforce the bans. However, since they were not permitted to search American ships, captains from other countries began to falsely fly American flags which frustrated the effort.

According to Mannix and Cowley, slavers began to carry an American passenger (called the capitano de bandiera, or captain of the flag) who ostensively took command of the vessel if it was boarded by the English. They claimed that one was a tailor, and another was a grog-shop keeper. It wasn't until 1862 when William H. Seward in the Lincoln administration negotiated a treaty with the British that allowed their ships to be searched and for violators to be tried in joint British and American courts.

Mannix and Cowley included many quotations from eyewitnesses to the horrors endured by the slaves and the callous indifference of the slavers. For example, they included a half page quotation from a narrative by George Lydiard Sulivan, a British naval officer in a squadron tasked with suppressing the slave trade in the Indian Ocean. The last paragraph of the quotation is as follows:

In another portion of the square are a number of women, their bodies painted, and their figures exposed with barely a yard of cloth around their hips, with rows of girls from the age of twelve and upwards exposed to the examination of Arabs and subject to inexpressible indignities by the dealers. We saw several Arab slave-dealers around these poor creatures; they were in treaty for the purchase of three or four women who had been made to take off the only rag of a garment which they wore.

— George Lydiard Sulivan (1873)

In another example, they included a quotation from George W. Howe, a medical student who shipped in 1859 with an illegal slave ship. Howe purported it to be the last slaving ship. The authors commented that it was one of the best descriptions of the morbid melancholy that often affected slaves during the Middle Passage. The quoted paragraph is as follows:

Notwithstanding their apparent good health, each morning three or four dead would be found, brought upon deck, taken by arms and heels, and tossed overboard as unceremoniously as an empty bottle. Of what did they die? and always at night? In the barracoons it was known that if a negro was not amused and kept in motion, he would mope, squat down with his chin on his knees and arms clasped about his legs, and in a very short time die. Among civilized races it is thought impossible to hold one’s breath until death follows; it is thought the Africans can do so. They had no means of concealing anything, and certainly did not kill each other. The duties of the Camisas were also to look after the other negroes during the day, and when found sitting with knees up and head drooping, the Camisas would start them up, run them about the deck, give them a small ration of rum, and divert them until in a normal condition.

— George W. Howe (1890)

The authors concluded that, "What [the slave trade] had produced in Africa was nothing but misery, stagnation, and social chaos . . . In the Western Hemisphere, besides introducing a vigorous new strain of immigrants, it had created the plantation system, it had opened vast areas to the cultivation of the four great slave crops–sugar, rice, tobacco, and cotton–and it had also encouraged the fatal and persistent myth of Negro inferiority". It took the American Civil War to effectively end the trade in about 1865.

Black Cargoes focused on the slavers and the human cargo that was carried from Africa to the New World. It did not include substantive discussions of re-capture slaves returned to Africa or the regional transport of slaves within the United States, which became the dominant form of forced relocation of slaves after the Revolutionary War.

== Illustrations ==
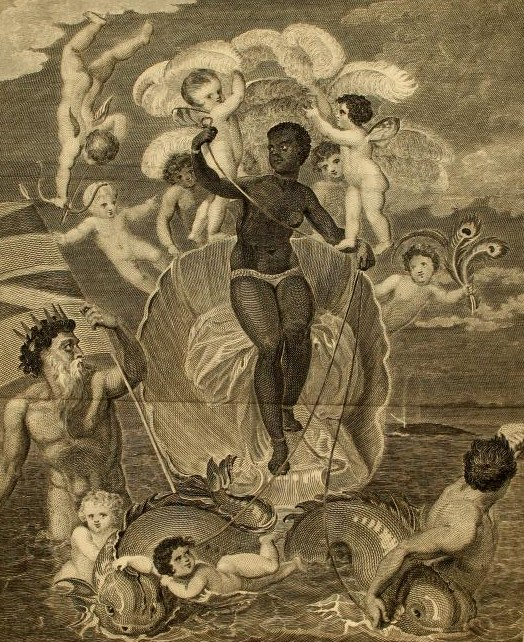
Engraving by William Grainger of Thomas Stothard, Voyage of the Sable Venus from Angola to the West Indies, 1801, one of many historical illustrations included in Black Cargoes.

Black Cargoes included many historical illustrations. One of the most beautiful and disturbing of these is the reproduction of a heroic sized painting, The Voyage of the Sable Venus from Angola to the West Indies, by Thomas Stothard of the British Royal Academy of Arts. The painting was reproduced as an etching to illustrate a book by Bryan Edwards extoling the slave economy of British colonies in the West Indies. Mannix and Cowley quoted four lines from the 15th stanza of the associated poem, The Sable Venus. An Ode, as follows:

In Florence, where she's seen;
Both just alike, except the white,
No difference, no—none at night
The beauteous dames between.
– anonymous but likely Isaac Teale (Edwards's tutor)

In addition to depicting the Sable Venus on a scallop shell in the fashion of "Botticelli's White Venus", it includes "a wealth of classical details, to show the painter's learning". According to Mannix and Cowley, the messages of the painting and poem were obvious: "that slave women are preferable to English girls at night, being passionate and accessible". The idealize figure belies the horrors faced by women slaves, which they described in graphic detail.

However, Mannix and Cowley's interpretation of the poem based on the quoted lines is at odds with the more detailed analysis of the full poem by Dr. Regulus Allen. She concluded that neither Edwards or Teale condoned intimate relations between white men and their black slaves. The poem indicates the blame for such relationships lay with the Black Venus herself. "What would seem an acknowledgment of the capture of African people and the violation of black women is inverted into the Sable Venus's conquest of European men . . . Through the representation of black women as sexual predators, the poem is able to deny the realities of slavery as well as white men's desire for African women". Also, the classical details of the painting were more than just a way to show the painters learning. They were intentionally included to convey meaning that would be interpretable to learned gentlemen. They act together with Stothard's depiction of the Sable Venus as "thick and muscular" (very different from classical white beauty) to convey the temptation of white man's "desire for the undesirable" and its unmentionable consequences. In 2015 Robin Coste Lewis published a collection of poems including a reimagining of the Voyage of the Sable Venus as a 79-page catalog of images of the black female form from 38,000 BC to the present.

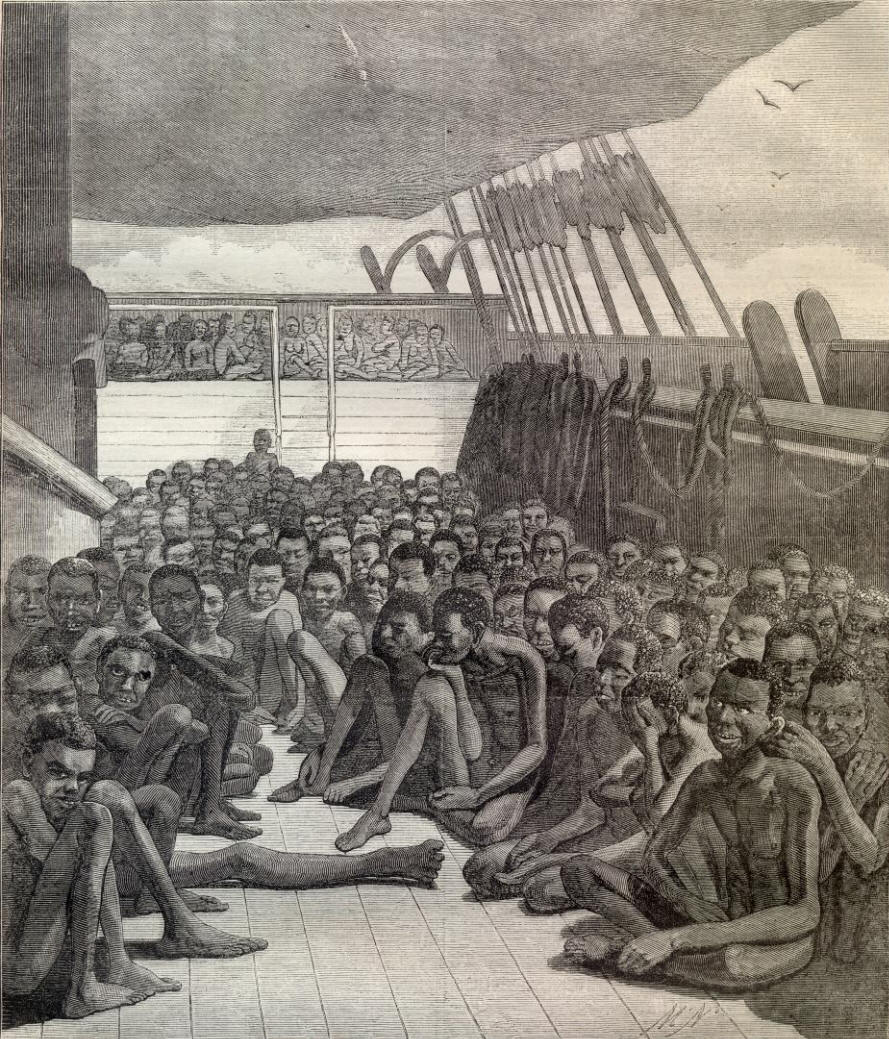
A wood engraving after a daguerreotype of slaves on the captured slave-ship, Wildfire, brought to Key West in 1860 from Harper's Weekly that was included in Black Cargoes and a New York Times review.

Another illustration in Black Cargoes (and reprinted in a New York Times review of the book) was taken from a Harper's Weekly magazine article, a wood engraving after a daguerreotype of slaves on the captured slave-ship, Wildfire, brought to Key West in 1860, well after the slave trade was prohibited in the United States in 1808. The legend in the book uses the phrase, "walking skeletons covered over with a piece of tanned leather". While the description seems applicable, the text of the Harper's Weekly article stated, "It is said by persons acquainted with the slave-trade and who saw them, that they were generally in a very good condition of health and flesh, as compared with other similar cargoes, owing to the fact that they had not been so much crowded together on board as is common in slave voyages, and had been better fed than usual". Apparently, this was due to the fact that the slavers had only been able to load 600 captives rather than 1000, the full capacity. Nevertheless 90 had died and at least 10 more died after the arrival (considered a small loss). In spite of their suffering, the author wrote that he was amused at "their strange looks, motions, and actions". It was anticipated that President James Buchanan would agree to have them transported to Liberia, which the United States had established as a colony for freed slaves in Africa.

The Wildfire was one of three slave ships seized by the United States Navy and returned to Key West in 1860. There were nearly 1,400 Africans aboard. They were place in former slave pens, before being shipped to Liberia. The high cost of keeping the slaves in Key West led to the passage of legislation that enabled the Navy to take slave ships and the re-captured Africans directly to Liberia.

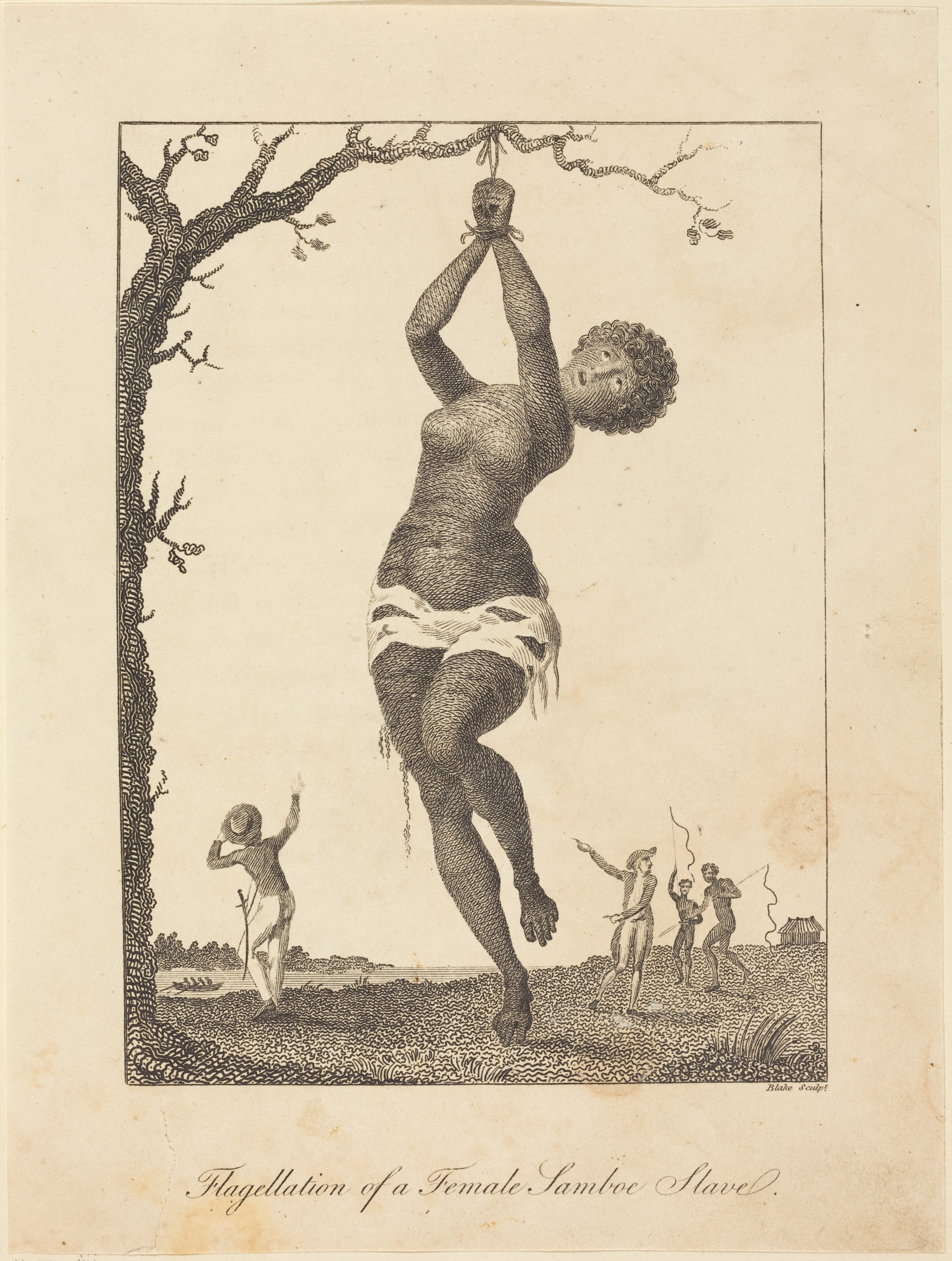
Flagellation of a Female Samboe Slave by William Blake after John G. Stedman in Stedman's book.

Mannix and Cowley's book and article included two engravings by William Blake after paintings by John Gabriel Stedman: "Flagellation of a Female Samboe Slave" in Black Cargoes and "A Negro Hung Alive by the Ribs to a Gallows" in their American Heritage article "Middle Passage". Both engravings originally appeared in Stedman's book The Narrative of a Five Years Expedition against the Revolted Negroes of Surinam. Stedman described the woman's torture as follows:

The first object that attracted my compassion while visiting on a neighboring estate was a truly beautiful Samboe girl of about eighteen, tied up with both arms to a tree, as naked as she came to the world, and lacerated in such a shocking condition by the whips of two Negro drivers that she was, from her neck to her ankles, literally dyed over with blood. It was after receiving two hundred lashes that I perceived her with her head hanging downwards, a most miserable spectacle.

— John Gabriel Stedman (1796)

A print by Johann Moritz Rugendas, Nègres a fond de Calle, taken from Voyage pittoresque dans le Brésil, published in 1835 was used on the dust cover of the first edition of Black Cargoes.

== Reviews ==
=== Contemporaneous ===
At the time of its release Black Cargoes received positive reviews from scholars. A reviewer in The Journal of Negro History (now known as The Journal of African American History) wrote: "This is not, perhaps, the definitive scholarly study of the Atlantic slave trade. I am not sure that the authors intended it to be. It is, however, a savage indictment of all those connected with what Wilberforce called "this bloody traffic", written in such a style as to make it easy but not pleasant reading". Another historian described it as "one of the canonical histories on the slave trade".

Time, the popular news magazine at the time, did an extensive summary which included many of the disturbing details. It included the dust cover illustration by Johann Moritz Rugendas. A reviewer in the New York Times wrote, "A SOUND book on a rich subject with special current overtones is always welcome, particularly when it fills a gap and increases public knowledge of ill-understood matters. 'Black Cargoes' does all that. It is the long-needed single volume covering all the salient angles of the evil, old trade in African Negroes [emphasis added]". The "special current overtones" presumably relates to the civil rights movement in the United States at the time. The article included the illustration of the captured Africans on the slave ship Wildfire in Key West included in the book.

=== Retrospective ===
Several more scholarly and quantitative treatises followed Black Cargoes. A reviewer in Reviews of American History in 1982 highlighted some flaws in Mannix and Cowley's analysis. For example, Mannix and Cowley estimated 50 million Africans were moved to the new world as slaves. Philip D. Curtin in his "pathbreaking" 1969 book The Atlantic Slave Trade as well as other scholars estimated the total was closer to ten million. Mannix and Cowley estimated that up to approximately 30% of the captured Africans died. More refined estimates averaged less than 20%. Mannix and Cowley claimed that in England and France "it created greater accumulations of wealth than had been known in previous centuries." Subsequent analysis indicated that the return on investment was about 10% or less, about what could be expected from other investments. Nevertheless, the critic concluded that despite its statistical inaccuracies, Black Cargoes presented a "vivid and compelling picture of the trade, in the process capturing its broader moral significance".

A review of James A. Rawley's The Transatlantic Slave Trade, A History (1981) in The New York Times Book Review section described it as a drier account than Black Cargoes but more reliable and thorough. While the newer work was said to correct many misconceptions and stereotypes, it was criticized as "coldly detached' and "miss[ing] the human side of the story". Thus it could play into a kind of "moral amnesia . . . apparently welcomed by many whites".

A reviewer in The Journal of Caribbean History recommended a quartet of narrative histories of the slave trade for non-specialist and college students that included Black cargoes. Others on his list included The Atlantic Slave Trade (2003), by Johannes Postma, which he suggested should be read first; Africa Remembered: Narratives by West Africans from the Era of the Slave Trade (1967) edited by Philip Curtin; and The Atlantic Slave Trade (1994) edited by David Northrup.
