= Xinru Liu =

American academic

- Education: University of Pennsylvania, Ph.D.
- Occupations: Professor of early Indian history and world history at The College of New Jersey

Xinru Liu (born 1951) is an American academic. She is professor Emeritus of early Indian history and world history at The College of New Jersey, and has held since 1993 a full professorship at the Institute of World History, Chinese Academy of Social Sciences.

Liu had little formal schooling but instead worked as a peasant and then as a factory worker during the Cultural Revolution. She taught herself English and history and gained admittance to the University of Pennsylvania, where she earned a PhD in 1985 for work on Ancient Indian and Chinese History. Her PhD dissertation was published by Oxford University Press as Ancient India and Ancient China: Trade and Religious Exchanges, A.D. 1-600 (1988). She has written many books on Indian and Chinese history.

Liu has won a Grant from American Association of University Women, 1984, a Grant from Woodrow Wilson International Center for Scholars, 1990. Her book, "Ancient India and Ancient China: Trade and Religious Exchanges, A.D. 1-600" won the award for Outstanding Research Works done between 1977 and 1991 from the Chinese Academy of Social Sciences. She is a member of the American Association of Asian Studies, The American Historical Association, and the World History Association.

Her most recent work is Dionysus and drama in the Buddhist art of Gandhara written jointly with Pia Brancaccio and published in the Journal of Global History.

== Books ==
- Ancient India and Ancient China: Trade and Religious Exchanges, A.D. 1-600 (1988)
- A Social History of Ancient India, Beijing: the Publisher of Chinese Social Sciences (1990)
- Studies on Monarchism and Despotism in the Ancient World (1993)
- Silk and Religion—An Exploration of Material Life and the Thought of People in A.D. 600-1200 (1996)
- The Silk Road, in the series of Essays on Global and Comparative History (1998)
- Connections Across Eurasia: Transportation, Communication, and Cultural Exchange on the Silk Roads (2007)
- The Silk Road in World History (2010)
- The Silk Roads: A Brief History with Documents (2012)
- Early Buddhist Society, the World of Gautama Buddha (2022)
- The World of the Ancient Silk Road ed. (2022)

== Articles ==
- "Republics in Ancient India," World History, Beijing, 1996, no.3.
- "A Study of Primitive Democracy," Historiography Quarterly, Beijing, 1997 no.2.
- "Origin of the Caste System in South Asia," Historiography Quarterly, Beijing, 1998, no.2.
- "Social Mobility in the Caste System in South Asia," Historiography Quarterly, Beijing, 1999, no. 4.
- "Silk, Robes and Relations between Early Chinese Dynasties and Nomads beyond the Great Wall," in Robes and honor: the Medieval World of Investiture, ed. Steward Gordon, St. Martin's press.
- "Migration and Settlement of the Yuezhi-Kushan : Interaction and Interdependence of Nomadic and Sedentary Societies," the Journal of World History, Fall 2001.
- "Trade and Pilgrimage Routes from Afghanistan to Taxila, Mathura and the Ganges Plains," Hindistan Turk Tarihi Arastirmalari, The Journal of Indo-Turcica, no.1, 2001, 113-140.
- "A Silk Road Legacy: The Spread of Buddhism and Islam," Journal of World History, Vol. 22 No. 1, 2011.
