= Stephen D. Behrendt =

New Zealand social scientist

Stephen D. Behrendt is a historian at Victoria University Wellington who specializes in the transatlantic slave trade. He earned his MA and PhD from the University of Wisconsin.

His updating of James A. Rawley's The Transatlantic Slave Trade: A History, originally published by Norton in 1981, was published by University of Nebraska Press in 2005. In 2010, he co-edited an edition of The Diary of Antera Duke, an Eighteenth-Century African Slave Trader with A. J. H. Latham and David Northrup.

== Selected publications ==
=== Books ===
- Rawley, James A. The Transatlantic Slave Trade: A History. University of Nebraska Press, Lincoln, 2005. (Reviser) ISBN 0803239610
- The Diary of Antera Duke, an Eighteenth-Century African Slave Trader. Oxford University Press, New York, 2010. (With A.J.H. Latham and David Northrup) ISBN 9780195376180

=== Articles and chapters ===
- "Human Capital in the British Slave Trade" in David Richardson, Suzanne Schwarz and Anthony Tibbles, eds., Liverpool and Transatlantic Slavery. Liverpool University Press, Liverpool, 2007. pp. 66-97.
- "Ecology, Seasonality and the Transatlantic Slave Trade" in Bernard Bailyn and Patricia L. Denault, eds., Soundings in Atlantic History: Latent Structures and Intellectual Currents, 1500-1830. Harvard University Press, Cambridge, 2009. pp. 44-85 & 461-85.
- "The Transatlantic Slave Trade" in Robert Paquette and Mark Smith (eds.), The Oxford Handbook of Slavery in the Americas. Oxford University Press, Oxford, 2010. pp. 251-74.
- "Sail on, Albion: the Usefulness of Lloyd's Registers for Maritime History, 1760–1840", International Journal of Maritime History, Vol. 26, No. 3 (July 2014), pp. 568–586. (With Peter M. Solar)
- "Liverpool as a Trading Port: Sailors’ Residences, African Migrants, Occupational Change and Probated Wealth", International Journal of Maritime History, Vol. 29, No. 4 (Nov. 2017), pp. 875–910. (With Robert A. Hurley)
