= Antera Duke =

Antera Duke (alive as late as 1788) was a leading African slave trader and Efik chief from Old Calabar in the Bight of Biafra at the eastern end of what was then considered Guinea (region) and now in eastern Nigeria (now in Cross River State) during the late eighteenth century. He gradually prospered and was member of the local Ekpe society that had a great amount of power over slave trade. He arranged funerals, which for men of standing like himself included the ritual sacrifice of slaves, who were decapitated to accompany the master into the spirit world. Duke and his fellow Efik traders "dressed as white men" and entertained captains of Slave ships.

His diary, written in Nigerian Pidgin English, was discovered in Scotland and published. This diary records his interactions with British merchants to whom he sold slaves; he writes about wearing "white man trousers" and entertaining the merchants he traded with.

In addition to trading slaves, Duke sometimes caught the slaves himself. According to his diary, once he settled an old score with a Bakassi merchant by capturing him and his two slaves and personally delivering them aboard a slave ship. During the three years he kept his diary (1785-88), he noted the departure of twenty vessels (all from Liverpool) he had helped to "slave".

A new edition of his diary, edited by Stephen D. Behrendt, A. J. H. Latham, and David Northrup, was published by Oxford University Press in 2010.

== Early life and education ==
Anterra was born around 1735 in Old Calabar, present-day southeastern Nigeria and he came from a prominent Efik family. Anterra's family were key players in an Afro-British slave-trading network centered in Duke Town. Through his involvement in this trade, he acquired proficiency in both spoken and written Pidgin English.

== Career ==
Anterra kept a business diary written in a mix of African languages and English in which he recorded his daily activities. He documented trade operations and disputes with British slave ship captains in his diary. In exchange for slaves, Antera and his fellow traders received cottons, household items, beads, gunpowder, firearms, and liquor which they didn't entirely consume but retained some as capital. He and his associates would then canoe down the Cross River to exchange them for additional slaves, whom they later traded to British captains.
