= Diego Olstein =

American professor (born 1970)

- Born: 24 March 1970 (age 56); Bahía Blanca, Argentina
- Occupations: Historian, Academic, Scholar

Academic background
- Education: Hebrew University of Jerusalem

Academic work
- Institutions: Hebrew University of Jerusalem, University of Pittsburgh
- Main interests: Global history, World history, Historiographical analysis, Medieval Spanish history

Diego Olstein (born 24 March 1970), also known as Diego Holstein, is a professor of history and department chair at the University of Pittsburgh. He was associate and interim director of the World History Center (2011–2017) and a member of the executive boards of the European Network of Universal and Global History (2005–2011) and the World History Association (2016–2018).

== Biography ==
Diego Olstein, grandson of Jewish immigrants from Poland and Russia, was born and raised in Bahía Blanca, Argentina. Upon graduation from Colegio Nacional and Seminario Dr. Hertzl high schools, he migrated to Israel. He earned a BA in history and psychology at the Hebrew University of Jerusalem, where he continued graduate studies. He wrote his MA thesis (1995-1996) and PhD dissertation (1998-2003) on medieval Spanish history under the supervision of Benjamin Ze'ev Kedar. During these formative years he worked in close collaboration with Moshe Zimmerman and Nathan Sussman at the Hebrew University; Reyna Pastor, Ana Rodriguez López, and Eduardo Manzano while residing at the Universidad Complutense and Centro de Investigaciones Científicas (CSIC) in Madrid; and with Thomas Glick at Boston University.

In 2004, Olstein returned to Israel and joined the faculty of the Hebrew University as a member of the Department of History until 2011. In 2009-2010 he was a visiting professor at the University of Wisconsin, Madison, and in 2011 he was appointed associate professor at the Department of History at the University of Pittsburgh, where he also became associate director of the World History Center. In 2017, he was appointed Full Professor.

Olstein is married to Irit Lerner-Olstein. They are the parents of Racheli, Ariel, and Maya.

== Research ==
=== Medieval Spanish history ===
Olstein's work on Medieval Spanish history concentrates on the processes of conquest and settlement, cultural diffusion, acculturation, and assimilation that unfolded during the twelfth and thirteenth centuries in the city of Toledo and its rural area in the wake of the Castilian conquest (1085). He focused on the patterns of interaction between the two largest groups in both city and hinterland: the Christian settlers from the north and the local Mozarabs, i.e., Arabized Christians. In his book La Era Mozárabe, Olstein asserts that after a century of self-imposed segregation, by the 1180s a process of intermingling between these two societies started evolving, reflected in the gradual demographic homogenization of the landscape, the growth of economic and neighboring relationships between communities, and the increasing rate of inter-community marriages. As a result of that, the Arabized Christians progressively adopted the Romance language (medieval Spanish) at the expense of their Arab language, redefined their identity, and became assimilated into the new settler society during the 14th century. However, amidst its own assimilation, the Mozarab community was able to acculturate the northern Christians by providing them with part of their Arab and Muslim economic, legal, and notarial legacies.

=== Historiographical analysis ===
Side by side with his research on Medieval Spanish history and particularly the Mozarab minority, Olstein paid attention to the history of historical writing on these topics, contextualizing them in the changing socio-economic, intellectual, ideological, and political conditions throughout the nineteenth and twentieth centuries in Spain. Subsequently, his historiographical interests gravitated towards the varieties of macro-historical approaches—such as the world-system, historical sociology, and world history—that study the past on larger scales of space and time. In Thinking History Globally, Olstein outlines the research methods, agendas, and professional networks of twelve distinctive historical branches that frame their analysis of the past beyond closed boundaries: comparative, relational, international, transnational, oceanic, global, world, and big histories; history of globalization; historical sociology; the world-system approach; and civilizational analysis. Beyond their singularities, the book arranges these twelve branches under the four big C's for thinking about history globally: comparisons, connections, conceptualizations, and contextualizations.

=== Global and world history ===
The conceptualization of the macro-historical approaches was followed by publications on world history. In "'Proto-globalization' and 'Proto-glocalizations' in the Middle Millennium" (Cambridge World History. Volume 5: Expanding Webs of Exchange and Conquest, 500-1500 CE), Olstein mapped the connections throughout the Eastern and Western hemispheres, concluding that the Middle Millennium (a more ecumenical concept than the European Middle Ages for referring to the period 500-1500 CE) was made of a multiplicity of tiny local worlds, in which, nevertheless, regional and even hemispheric forces such as conquest, trade, and religious conversion had had defining impacts on local societies. In other publications on world history, Olstein moved beyond his expertise in medieval studies, outlining broader arguments, for example, by periodizing world history in accordance with three major regional divergences: the "Greatest divergence" starting by the end of the last Ice Age (ca. 15,000 before the present) and isolating the Old and the New Worlds from one another until ca. 1500; the "Great divergence" bifurcating the paths of Europe and Afro-Asia since ca. 1500; and the "American divergence" that divided the fortunes of the New World societies from ca. 1500 onwards. Similarly, he periodized the history of globalization into six distinctive phases: three waves of "hemispherization" in Afro-Eurasia during the ages of Classical, Muslim, and Mongol Empires and three waves of globalization during the ages of colonialism, industrialization, and neoliberalism.

Olstein's last book, A Brief History of Now, presents a global history of the last two centuries, analyzing the interplay between technological innovation, economic globalization, hegemonic world order, political regimes, and socio-economic inequality.

== Selected publications ==
=== Books ===
1. Olstein, D. A Brief History of Now. Palgrave Macmillan, 2021. [English]
2. Olstein, D. Pensar la Historia Globalmente. Fondo de Cultura Económica, 2019. [Spanish]
3. Olstein, D. Thinking History Globally. Palgrave Macmillan, 2014. [English]
4. Olstein, D. La era mozárabe: los mozárabes de Toledo (siglos XII y XIII) en la historiografía, las fuentes y la historia. Ediciones Universidad de Salamanca, 2006. [Spanish]

=== Medieval Spanish history ===
1. Olstein, D. (1997) "Los Fragmentos Hartzianos y el Medioevo Hispano." Reflejos 6, pp. 71–79. [Spanish]
2. Olstein, D. (2000) "A Minority under Two Opposing Majorities: The Morazabs of Medieval Spain." In Volkov, Shulamit (Ed.), Being Different: Minorities, Aliens and Outsiders in History, pp. 79–92. Zalman Shazar Center for Jewish History, Jerusalem. [Hebrew]
3. Olstein, D. (2003) "El Péndulo Mozarabe." Anales Toledanos 39, pp. 37–77. [Spanish]
4. Olstein, D. (2006) "The Arabic Origins of Romance Private Documents." Islam and Christian-Muslim Relations, 17:4, pp. 433–443. [English]
5. Olstein, D. La era mozárabe: los mozárabes de Toledo (siglos XII y XIII) en la historiografía, las fuentes y la historia. Ediciones Universidad de Salamanca, 2006. [Spanish]
6. Olstein, D. (2009) "El procés d'asimilació dels mossàrabs de Toledo deprés de la conquesta castellana." Afers, 61, pp. 611–622. [Catalan]
7. Olstein, D. (2010) "Judíos y mozárabes en Toledo castellana (1085-1315): vidas paralelas, vidas conjuntas, destinos divergentes." In Assis, Yom Tov et al. (Eds.), Encuentros culturales entre judíos, paganos, cristianos y musulmanes. De la Antiguedad a la Edad Media, Ediciones Lilmod International Center for University Teaching of Jewish Civilization, Buenos Aires, pp. 187–202. [Spanish]
8. Olstein, D. (2011) "The Mozarabs of Toledo (12th-13th Centuries) in Historiography, Sources, and History." In Herbers, Klaus and Maser, Mattias (Eds.), Reihe Geschichte und Kultur der iberischen Welt. Berlin: Lit Verlang, pp. 151–186. [English]

=== Historiographical analysis ===
1. Olstein, D. (1999) "Historiografía Mozárabe en su Contexto: Restauración, Dictadura y Democracia." Reflejos 8, pp. 91–104. [Spanish]
2. Olstein, D. (2004) "World History: An Integrative Model". World History Bulletin, Vol. XX, Number 2, pp. 4–6. [English]
3. Olstein, D. (2004) "Globalization and Historical Writing since the "Global Village"." Comparativ 14, no 2, pp. 102-116. [English]
4. Olstein, D. (2006) "Le molteplici origini della globalizzazione. Un dibattito storiografico." Contemporanea 3, pp. 403–422. [Italian]
5. Olstein, D. (2006) "Comparative History and World History: Contrasts and Contacts." In Shagrir, Iris, Ellenblum, Ronnie, and Riley-Smith, Jonathan (Eds.), In Laudem Hierosolymitani: Studies in Crusades and Medieval Culture in Honour of Benjamin Z. Kedar, pp. 297–306, Ashgate. [English]
6. Olstein, D. (2007) "Monographic and Macro History: Confronting Paradigms." In Manning, Patrick (Ed.), Global Practice in World History, pp. 23–37, Markus Wiener Publishers: Princeton, New Jersey. [English]
7. Olstein, D. (2009) "Comparative History: The Pivot of Historiography." In Kedar, Benjamin (Ed.), New Ventures in Comparative History, pp. 37–52. Magnes Press, Jerusalem. [English]
8. Olstein, D. (2009) "La nueva historia mundial en sus variedades." In Barros, Carlos (Ed.), Historia a Debate. Vol. III. Historia a Debate Editorial: Santiago de Compostela, pp. 131–144. [Spanish]
9. Olstein, D. (2012) "711 en las fuentes y la historiografía: un ejercicio de combinatorica." In Neyra, Andrea and Rodríguez, Gerardo (Eds.), ¿Qué implica ser medievalista? Vol. III. Universidad Nacional de Mar del Plata, pp. 35 –51. [Spanish]
10. Olstein, D. Thinking History Globally. Palgrave Macmillan, 2014. [English]
11. Olstein, D. (2018) "Eight World Historians." In Weller, Charles (Ed.), 21st-Century Narratives of World History: World Historians in Global Dialogue. Palgrave Macmillan, pp. 339–346. [English]
12. Olstein, D. Pensar la Historia Globalmente. Fundación de Cultura Económica, 2019. [Spanish]

=== Global and world history ===
1. Olstein, D. and Hübner, S. (Eds.) Preaching the Civilizing Mission and Modern Cultural Encounters. Special Issue of the Journal of World History. Volume 27:3, 2016. [English]
2. Olstein, D. (2015) "Proto-globalization and Proto-glocalizations in the Middle Millennium." In Kedar, Benjamin and Wiesner-Hanks, Merry (Eds.), Cambridge World History. Volume 5: Expanding Webs of Exchange and Conquest, 500-1500 CE. Cambridge University Press, pp. 665–684. [English]
3. Olstein, D. (2017) "Latin America in Global History: An Historiographic Overview." Estudos Historicos, 30:60, pp. 253–272. [English]
4. Olstein, D. (2019) "Brevísima Historia de la Globalización Más Larga." In: Araújo, Erick Assis de; Santos Jr., João Júlio Gomes dos (eds.). História Urbana e Global: novas tendências e abordagens. Fortaleza: Editora da UECE, 2019, 32 pp. 110–134. [Spanish]
5. Olstein, D. (2019) "Knowledge Diffusion: The Global and the Local." International ConferenceGlobal Transfer of Knowledge and the Change of Local Society: Western Knowledge and East Asia. Kyungpook National University, Korea, 2019. [English]
