= Bibliotheca Polyglotta =

The Bibliotheca Polyglotta is a Norwegian database for Multilingualism project, lingua franca and science per global history at the University of Oslo. The aim of the project is according to pages is "producing a web corpus of Buddhist texts for using in multilingual lexicography. More generally, will the texts used for the study Sanskrit, Chinese and Tibetan."
