= T. Walter Wallbank =

American historian

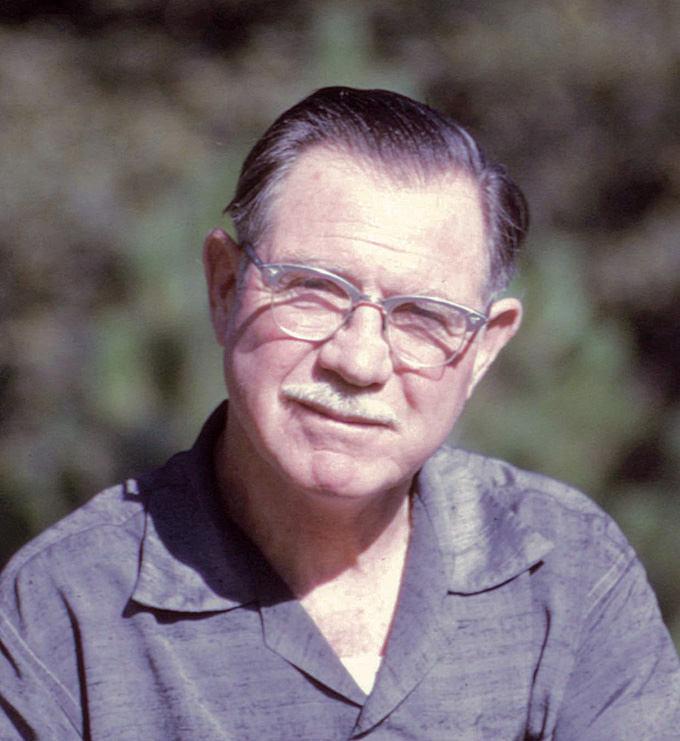
T. Walter Wallbank

Thomas Walter Wallbank (July 27, 1901 – May 16, 1992) was an American historian and one of the original authors of the best-selling textbook Civilization Past & Present.

== Biography ==
Wallbank taught history at the University of Southern California from 1933 to 1964. He collaborated with Alastair M. Taylor to write Civilization Past & Present. Civilization (1942) was the first world-history textbook published in the United States to enjoy great success in sales. Other authors eventually joined the writing team for later editions.

The textbook grew out of a survey course in history given by Wallbank at USC during the early stages of the Second World War, the purpose of the course being to offer students a clearer idea of how the world they were living in came to be. There had been a widespread sentiment in the United States that the country should avoid entanglements in foreign affairs, an attitude the authors thought was reflected in the limitations of most survey courses on Western culture. They believed that the country would need an informed citizenry for the role the United States would play in the world in coming decades. “To become so informed, students needed to learn about the great culture systems of the world, their historical antecedents, and those current trends and problems which were shaping the course of contemporary world affairs.”

Wallbank's areas of specialization were South Asia and Africa. He received the Watumull Prize of the American Historical Association award in 1950 for another book, India in the New Era.

He was a Fulbright professor at Fuad University in Cairo from 1951 to 1952. After receiving a Rockefeller Grant, he undertook field work in Africa, Pakistan and India, from 1955 to 1956.

== Selected bibliography ==
- Civilization Past & Present, with Alastair M. Taylor (Chicago: Scott, Foresman, 1942 and subsequent editions) ISBN 978-0673388681.
- The World in Turmoil, 1914-1944, with Alastair M. Taylor (Chicago: Scott, Foresman, 1944).
- India: A Survey of the Heritage and Growth of Indian Nationalism (New York: Henry Holt, 1948).
- India in the New Era (Chicago: Scott, Foresman, 1951). Reprinted in an abridged but revised edition as A Short History of India and Pakistan (New York: New American Library, 1958).
- Man's Story: World History in Its Geographic Setting (Chicago: Scott, Foresman, 1951 and subsequent editions).
- Living World History, with Arnold Fletcher (Chicago: Scott, Foresman, 1958). Subsequent editions co-authored with Arnold Schrier.
- Western Perspectives: A Concise History of Civilization, with Alastair M. Taylor and Nels M. Bailkey (Glenview, Illinois: Scott, Foresman, 1973).
- History and Life: The World and Its People (Glenview, Illinois: Scott, Foresman, 1977 and subsequent editions).
