= Alastair M. Taylor =

Canadian historian (1915–2005)

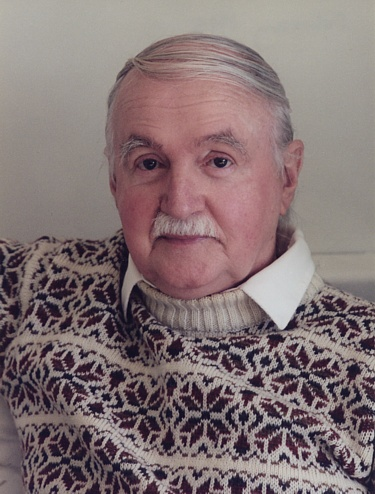
Alastair M. Taylor

Alastair MacDonald Taylor (March 12, 1915 – October 15, 2005) was a Canadian historian, filmmaker, United Nations official, professor of geography and political studies, and interdisciplinary thinker. He co-authored the first world-history textbook published in the United States. He played an active role in, and became the leading chronicler of, the diplomatic intervention by the United Nations to secure the independence of Indonesia. He was also among the first to apply systems theory to the historical development of human societies.

== Biography ==
Taylor was born in Vancouver, British Columbia, in 1915, the youngest son of Scottish immigrants. In 1930 the family moved to California, where he attended Hollywood High School and then the University of Southern California, from which he graduated summa cum laude in 1937. The topic of his Master's thesis at USC was "The Decline of Scottish Monasticism in the Fifteenth Century". At age 22 he collaborated with T. Walter Wallbank to begin writing Civilization Past and Present. The first world-history textbook in the United States, and a best-seller since its initial appearance in 1942, it has been published in many editions, and with additional authors, and is familiar to generations of students.

In 1942, Taylor returned to Canada to enlist in the armed forces, but was recruited to the National Film Board in Ottawa, where he worked for pioneering documentary filmmaker John Grierson, making films for the war effort. Taylor himself directed two short films focusing on the situation of Canadian workers in the domestic wartime economy.

Between 1944 and 1952, Taylor worked for the United Nations Relief and Rehabilitation Administration in Washington, D.C. and then for the UN Secretariat in New York City. At UNRRA he was a speechwriter for Herbert Lehman, former governor of New York state, and then for Fiorello La Guardia, former mayor of New York City. Taylor became the Official Spokesman of the Security Council's United Nations Commission for Indonesia, which oversaw the peace settlement between the Netherlands and its former colony. In this capacity he spent several months in Indonesia in 1949 and 1950 and also attended the Dutch-Indonesian Round Table Conference in The Hague, Netherlands.

Taylor received his doctorate from Balliol College, Oxford, in 1955. His dissertation was the basis for his book Indonesian Independence and the United Nations (1960), with a foreword by Lester B. Pearson. Upon its publication, this work was hailed as a "brilliant study of the protracted negotiations that led to Indonesia's independence" and as "the fullest, most accurate, and least biased" treatment in print of the UN's role.

In 1960, Taylor joined the faculty of Queen's University at Kingston, Ontario, where he taught in both the Geography and Political Studies departments until 1980. At Queen's, in the early 1960s, he developed his systems-theory model of the historical evolution of human societies, which he designated Time-Space-Technics (TST). TST understands human societies as instances of open natural systems equilibrating with their environments in a hierarchy of integrative levels. It identifies an evolutionary sequence of world-views that organize societal systems at the different levels. Taylor named these world-views "Mythos", "Theos", "Logos", and "Holos". TST focuses on the interplay and tension between what Taylor called "material technics" and "societal technics", and attempts to identify factors responsible for fracturing a system's equilibrium and quantizing it to a different level of societal organization (either more or less complex). Taylor published a number of articles about the TST model and in his last years was preparing a book-length exposition of his ideas. He believed that modern society stands at a critical juncture: although industrial society has become culturally and environmentally unsustainable, we have the opportunity to replace it with new values and institutions appropriate to a sustainable global civilization.

== Selected bibliography ==
- Civilization Past and Present, with T. Walter Wallbank (Chicago: Scott, Foresman, 1942 and subsequent editions).
- The World in Turmoil, 1914-1944, with T. Walter Wallbank (Chicago: Scott, Foresman, 1944).
- Indonesian Independence and the United Nations (London: Stevens, 1960; Ithaca, N.Y.: Cornell University Press, 1960; Westport, Conn.: Greenwood Press, 1975).
- "Toward a Field Theory of International Relations", General Semantics Bulletin 35 (1968): 9–43.
- "Evolution-Revolution, General Systems Theory, and Society", in Rubin Gotesky and Ervin Laszlo (eds.), Evolution-Revolution (New York: Gordon and Breach, 1971).
- "Integrative Principles in Human Societies", in Henry Margenau (ed.), Integrative Principles of Modern Thought (New York: Gordon and Breach, 1972).
- Western Perspectives: A Concise History of Civilization, with T. Walter Wallbank and Nels M. Bailkey (Glenview, Illinois: Scott, Foresman, 1973).
- "A Systems Approach to the Political Organization of Space", Social Sciences Information 14:5 (1975): 7−40.
- "Process and Structure in Sociocultural Systems", in Erich Jantsch and Conrad H. Waddington (eds.), Evolution and Consciousness: Human Systems in Transition (Reading, Mass.: Addison-Wesley, 1976).
- "The Historical Evolution of Mankind's Inner and Outer Dimensions", in Ervin Laszlo and Judah Bierman (eds.), Goals in a Global Community, vol. I (New York: Pergamon Press, 1977).
- Poles Apart: Winners and Losers in the History of Human Development, with Angus M. Taylor (Ottawa: International Development Research Centre, 1992).
- "Time-Space-Technics: The Evolution of Societal Systems and World-views", World Futures: The Journal of General Evolution 54 (1999): 21–102.
- Minerva's Owl: Selected Sonnets and Other Verse (Victoria: Sartor Press, 2017).

== Filmography ==
- A Man and His Job (National Film Board of Canada, 1943)
- Main Street, Canada (National Film Board of Canada, 1945)
