= Ross E. Dunn =

American historian and writer (born 1941)

Ross E. Dunn is an American historian and a writer, the author of several books including The Adventures of Ibn Battuta, and a coauthor of the highly cited History on Trial: Culture Wars and the Teaching of the Past. He is also a Professor Emeritus at San Diego State University.

The Adventures of Ibn Battuta is based on the travels of the famous 14th-century Muslim adventurer Ibn Battuta. He traveled from Morocco in West Africa to China; however, the book mostly focuses on his travels between his hometown in Morocco to Mecca in Saudi Arabia. The book was first published in 1986 and reissued in 2005 by University of California Press.

Dunn did his graduate studies in the program in World History at the University of Wisconsin–Madison, receiving his Ph.D. in 1970. He was president of the World History Association in 1984. Dunn is currently the Co-Director for World History, working closely with the National Center for History in the Schools.
