= Anand Yang =

American historian

- Born: Shantiniketan, Bengal Presidency, British India (now West Bengal, India)
- Education: Swarthmore College (BA); University of Virginia

Anand A. Yang is a history professor at the University of Washington, United States. He has also served as the Chair of the University of Washington's Department of History and the Henry M. Jackson School of International Studies. From 2006 to 2007, he served as the President for the Association for Asian Studies, and from 2007 to 2009 he was the President of the World History Association. His scholarship has focused on agricultural and Indian peasant life in British Raj colonial India, social history, law and criminality, and life in Indian markets.

== Early life ==
Yang was born in the late British Raj in the town of Shantiniketan to Chinese parents. He grew up and attended school in New Delhi but finished his high school education in Mexico City, before moving to the United States to attend college. He received his Bachelor of Arts degree from Swarthmore College in Swarthmore, Pennsylvania and his PhD in History from the University of Virginia.

== Career ==
Yang began his teaching career as a Visiting Lecturer at Sweet Briar College in Fall of 1974. From there became a Professor at the University of Utah in 1975. From 1989 to 1994, Yang served as the Chair of the Department of History at University of Utah. In 1995, he became the Director of Asia Studies. In 2002, he was hired by the University of Washington (UW) to serve as the Director of the Henry M. Jackson School of Studies. In 2010, he became the Chair of the South Asia Studies Center at UW. In 2015, he was named the Chair of the History Department.

Yang was an editor for The Journal of Asian Studies from 1995 to 2001, and for the journal Peasant Studies from 1981 to 1994.

== Selected publications ==
- Yang, Anand A., et al., editors. Thirteen Months in China: A Subaltern Indian and the Colonial World. New Delhi: Oxford University Press, 2017.
- Yang, Anand. Interactions: Transregional Perspectives on World History. Honolulu: University of Hawai'I Press, 2005. Print.
- Yang, Anand. Bazaar India: Markets, Society, and the Colonial State in Bihar. California: University of California Press, 1999. Print.
- Yang, Anand. The Limited Raj: Agrarian Relations in Colonial India, Saran District, 1793–1920. California: University of California Press, 1989. Print.
- Yang, Anand. Crime and Criminality in British India. Tucson: University of Arizona Press, 1986. Print.
