= The Rise of the West =

1963 book by William H. McNeill

- Cover of the first edition
- Author: William Hardy McNeill
- Language: English
- Subject: World history
- Publisher: University of Chicago Press
- Publication date: 1963
- Publication place: United States
- Media type: Print (Hardcover and Paperback)

The Rise of the West: A History of the Human Community is a book by University of Chicago historian William H. McNeill, first published in 1963 and enlarged with a retrospective preface in 1991. It explores world history in terms of the effect different old world civilizations had on one another, and especially the deep influence of Western civilization on the rest of the world in the past 500 years. He argues that societal contact with foreign civilizations is the primary force in driving historical change. In 1964 it won the National Book Award in History and Biography.

== Description ==
Part I of The Rise of the West discusses evolutionary prehistory, the breakthrough to civilization in Mesopotamia, the era of Middle Eastern dominance, and the formation of peripheral civilizations in India, Greece, and China to 500 BC.

Part II discusses the Eurasian cultural balance to 1500 AD, including the expansion of Hellenism, the closure of the Eurasian ecumene, the development of major religions, the barbarian onslaught, resurgence of the Middle East, and steppe conquerors. McNeill proposes that the basic engine of world history during this period is the temporary primacy of different regions of the ecumene, with a rough parity reestablished as innovations spread to other centers of civilization. The sequence is Hellenistic/Indian/Islamic/Chinese and Mongol. Generally the eras are structured in terms of the internal history of the dominant region, followed by the history of the rest of the world with a focus on how they reacted to the diffusing techniques and ideas of the dominant region.

Part III examines the era of Western dominance. From 1500 to 1750 this is represented by the challenge of Western Europe to the world in a period of exploitation and colonization and the changing balance of the ecumene in the Islamic world, the Far East, and Africa. Before 1750, Western superiority is similar in scope to the primacy previously enjoyed by other regions. The book describes the "tottering balance" of older orders within Europe, European expansion and acculturation in outliers, including the Americas. The rise of the West on a cosmopolitan scale from 1750 to 1950 is described as to continued territorial expansion, industrialism, the democratic revolution, and intellectual aspects. This period marks a discontinuity: the global influence of the West expands beyond all historical parallels.

== Reception ==
Hugh Trevor-Roper wrote a glowing review in The New York Times Book Review. McNeill's Rise of the West won the U.S. National Book Award in History and Biography in 1964. and was named one of the 100 Best Nonfiction Books of the 20th century by the Modern Library. One critical response has been that the West did not rise, the East fell or withdrew.

The Rise had two major effects on historical analysis. First, it challenged the view of civilizations as independent entities subject to rise and fall as postulated by Arnold J. Toynbee and Oswald Spengler, who viewed civilizations as discrete and independent. McNeill had actually conceived of the book as a student in 1936 to counter the theses of Spengler's Decline of the West (the title The Rise of the West chosen as a deliberate contrast) and Toynbee's A Study of History, which "postulated that civilizations marched to their own drummers, largely unaffected by foreign influences". McNeill, on the other hand, stresses the diffusion of techniques and ideas, making connections between civilizations crucially important. Second, it provided a framework for theories like world-systems theory and dependency theory, which "cemented the centrality of the 'West' in world history".

It's important to note, however, that in a 1990 article in the Journal of World History, McNeill reflected that The Rise of the West must be viewed as "an expression of the postwar imperial mood in the United States" and admitted that it could somewhat be seen as a "form of intellectual imperialism". Later, in a 1991 essay, McNeill emphasized that the unifying theme of his book was the importance of interrelation and cultural diffusion rather than a flat description of western history's effect on other civilizations.

== See also ==
- Great Divergence
- Guns, Germs, and Steel
