= Jerry H. Bentley =

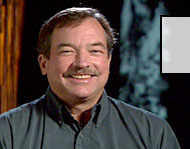
Bentley in 2004

Jerry Harrell Bentley (December 12, 1949 – July 15, 2012) was an American academic and professor of world history. He was a founding editor of the Journal of World History since 1990. He wrote on the cultural history of early modern Europe and on cross-cultural interactions in world history. He was one of the cited experts in Annenberg Media's 2004 series of educational videos broadcast on the Annenberg Channel, Bridging World History.

== Early life and education ==
Bentley was born in Birmingham, Alabama, United States. He attended Brainerd High School in Chattanooga, Tennessee, and then went on to the University of Tennessee, where he obtained a bachelor's degree in 1971. He received his master's degree (1974) and PhD (1976) from the University of Minnesota.

== Career ==
He began working as an assistant professor at the University of Hawaiʻi at Mānoa in 1976. He became associate professor in 1982 and full professor in 1987.

In 1990 he was the founding editor of the Journal of World History, with Elton L. Daniel and Daniel Kwok as editorial board members. He contributed to and co-edited a series of monographs on world history, Perspectives on the Global Past, and was a founding member of the World History Association. Bentley and Ziegler were also co-authors of the college-level world history textbook Traditions and Encounters.

In 2002, Bentley became the Director at the Center for World History at the University of Hawaiʻi.

== Awards and recognition ==
In 1985, Bentley received the Fujio Matsuda Scholarship to develop the University of Hawaiʻi's world history department. In 1987, he received the President's Citation for Meritorious Teaching from the University of Hawaiʻi.

- Pioneers in World History Award (2011)

Two awards are named for him: the Bentley Book Prize of the World History Association, renamed in 2012; and the Jerry Bentley Prize in World History of the American Historical Association, established in 2014.

== Death ==
Bentley died of pancreatic cancer in 2012.

== Works ==
- "Erasmus, Jean Le Clerc, and the Principle of the Harder Reading," Renaissance Quarterly 31, number 3 (Autumn, 1978), pages 309–321.
- Humanists and Holy Writ: New Testament Scholarship in the Renaissance (Princeton University Press, 1983).
- Politics and Culture in Renaissance Naples (Princeton University Press, 1987).
- Old World Encounters: Cross-Cultural Contacts and Exchanges in Pre-Modern Times (New York: Oxford University Press, 1993).
- (with Herbert F. Ziegler) Traditions and Encounters: A Global Perspective on the Past (Boston: McGraw-Hill, 2000).
- "Cross-Cultural Interaction and Periodization in World History," The American Historical Review 101 (1996): pages 749–770.
- "Hemispheric Integration, 500–1500 C.E.," Journal of World History 9 (1998): pages 237–254
- "World History," in D.R. Woolf, ed., Making History: A Global Encyclopedia of Historical Writing (New York: Garland, 1998), pages 968–70.
- "Sea and Ocean Basins as Frameworks of Historical Analysis," Geographical Review 89 (1999): pages 215–224.
- "Shapes of World History in Twentieth-Century Scholarship," in Michael P. Adas, ed., Agricultural and Pastoral Societies in Ancient and Classical History (Philadelphia: Temple University Press, 2001), pages 3–35.
- "The New World History," in Lloyd Kramer and Sarah Maza, eds., A Companion to Western Historical Thought (Oxford: Blackwell, 2002), pages 393–416.
- "World History and Grand Narrative," in Benedikt Stuchtey, ed., Writing World History, 1800–2000 (Oxford University Press, 2003).
- "Why Study World History?," in World History Connected 5, number 1 (2007).
- "Europeanization of the World or Globalization of Europe?" Religions 3, number 2 (2012): pages 441–454.
