= Plagues and Peoples =

Epidemiological history book by William H. McNeill

- Cover of the first edition
- Author: William H. McNeill
- Language: English
- Subjects: epidemiological history
- Genre: Non-fiction
- Published: 1976
- Publisher: Anchor Books, Garden City, New York
- Publication place: US
- Pages: 369
- ISBN: 978-0-385-12122-4

Plagues and Peoples is a book on epidemiological history by historian William H. McNeill, published by Anchor Books in 1976. It was a critical and popular success, presenting a then novel view of infectious disease as both enabled by social and environmental conditions and molding the development of cultures.

== Content ==
McNeill, a historian at the University of Chicago, analyzed epidemics as social as well as biological events, mediated by ecological, economic, and cultural factors and in turn affecting the fate of cultures and thus central to history. The book examines the effects of epidemics including smallpox in Mexico, the bubonic plague in China, typhoid in Europe, and the Athenian plague, and suggested a modified flu virus was likely to cause the next pandemic. McNeill wrote in the introduction that the impetus for his researching and writing the book was the role played by smallpox in the fall of the Aztec Empire.

McNeill also makes a broader comparison of civilization to disease, as a "macroparasite" that weakens societies but also confers political and bureaucratic protection as endemic diseases can confer protection against severe outbreaks of infection. He envisaged a crucial balance between disease-causing "microparasites" and human "macroparasites" and warned that human "parasitism" on the earth might lead to ecological catastrophe.

== Publication history ==
Plagues and Peoples was first published in the United States in 1976 by Anchor Books, a division of Doubleday. A UK edition was published by Basil Blackwell in 1977. With the onset of the AIDS epidemic in the 1980s, a new preface was added to the book in 1998.

== Reception ==
Plagues and Peoples was a critical success, hailed as a rare synthesis of patterns in epidemiology from a global perspective. It sold well and has remained in print into the 2020s.

The view presented in the book of epidemic disease as both a biological and a social phenomenon, its spread affected by environmental and social conditions, is now accepted within epidemiology. It has been influential in historical studies. In particular, along with Alfred W. Crosby's The Columbian Exchange, McNeill's book popularized the view that European expansion into the Americas was facilitated by the diseases it introduced into indigenous populations.

The book has been criticized as lacking evidence for some of its assertions and as Eurocentric, and some arguments have since been undermined, such as McNeill's rejection of a New World origin for syphilis.

== See also ==
- Guns, Germs and Steel
