= Journal of Global History =

- Discipline: World history
- Language: English
- Edited by: Elisabeth Leake

Publication details
- History: 2006–present
- Publisher: Cambridge University Press
- Frequency: Triannual
- Impact factor: 2.000 (2021)

Standard abbreviations
- ISO 4: J. Glob. Hist.

Indexing
- ISSN: 1740-0228 (print); 1740-0236 (web)
- LCCN: 2006257208
- OCLC no.: 70078780

Links
- Journal homepage; Online access; Online archive

The Journal of Global History is a triannual peer-reviewed academic history journal covering the study of comparative, world, and global history. It was established in 2006 and is published by Cambridge University Press. The editor-in-chief is Ewout Frankema (Wageningen University & Research).

Popular topics for the journal include globalization, comparative history, and cross-border history. Articles are meant to engage in interdisciplinary debates among historians sociologists, economists, and political scientists, as well as specialists in non-written histories, such as geographers, archaeologists, and biologists.

== History ==
Early ideas for a journal of global history began at the Institute of Historical Research when its director Patrick K. O'Brien created a new seminar in 1990. In 2003, the Global Economic History Network connected 49 historians to discuss the history of globalization. Subsequently, a graduate degree was created at the London School of Economics that focused on "meta-narratives in history", focusing on environments, geopolitics, religions, cultures, economies, gender, ideas, and science. Five years after the degree was launched, the London School of Economics and Cambridge University Press co-sponsored The Journal of Global History.

== Abstracting and indexing ==
The journal is abstracted and indexed in:

- Arts and Humanities Citation Index
- Current Contents/Arts & Humanities
- Current Contents/Social and Behavioral Sciences
- EBSCO databases
- Index Islamicus
- Scopus
- Social Sciences Citation Index

According to the Journal Citation Reports, the journal has a 2021 impact factor of 2.000.

== See also ==
- Historic recurrence
- Journal of World History
