= William H. McNeill =

Canadian historian (1917–2016)

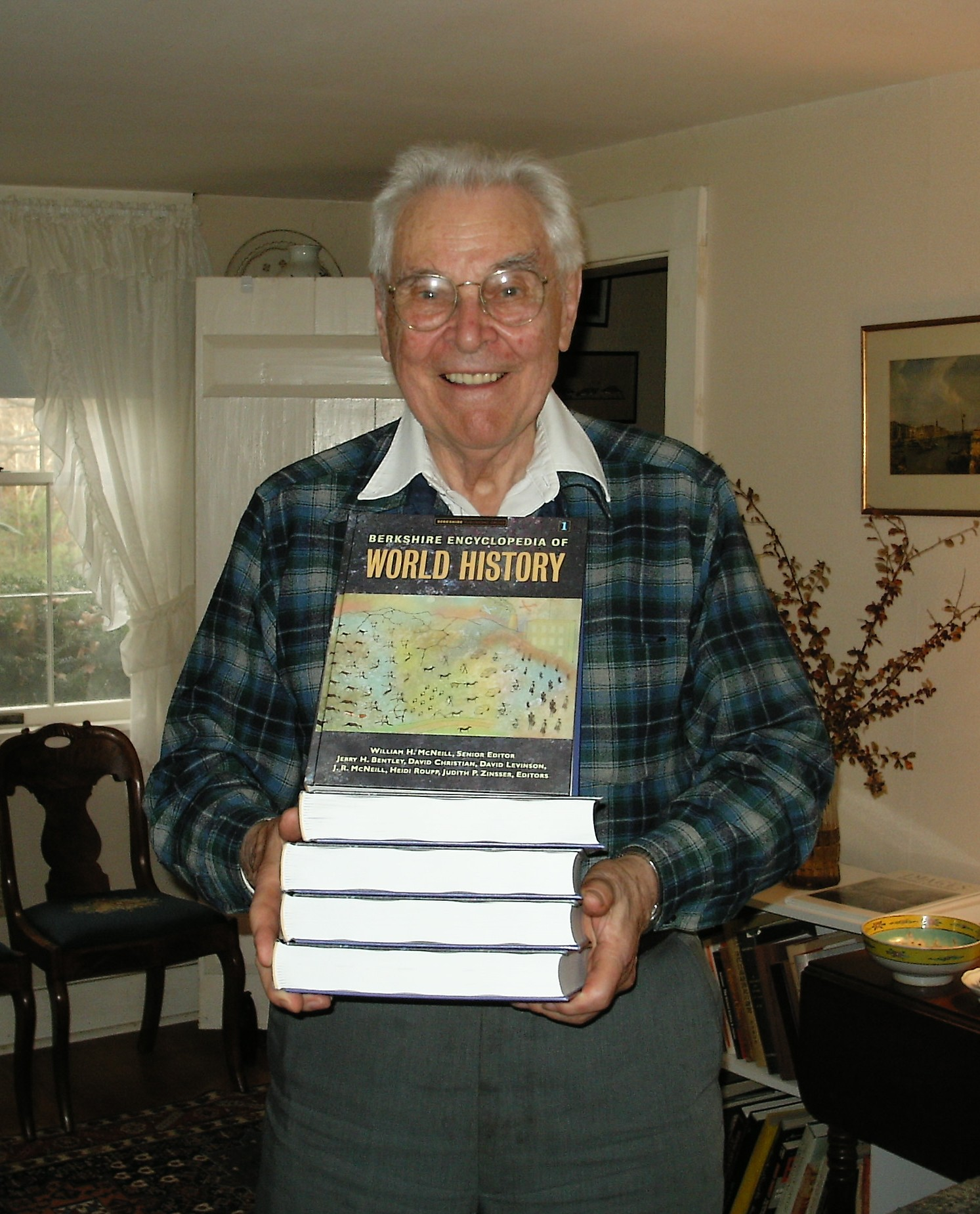
- Holding first copies of the Berkshire Encyclopedia of World History on his 87th birthday
- Born: October 31, 1917; Vancouver, British Columbia, Canada
- Died: July 8, 2016 (aged 98); Torrington, Connecticut, U.S.
- Occupations: Professor; historian; writer
- Spouse: Elizabeth Darbishire (m. 1946–2006)
- Children: J. R. McNeill, Andrew, Ruth, Deborah
- Awards: National Book Award; National Humanities Medal

Academic background
- Education: University of Chicago; Cornell University
- Thesis: The Influence of the Potato on Irish History (1947)
- Doctoral advisor: Carl L. Becker
- Influences: Arnold J. Toynbee

Academic work
- Discipline: World history
- Institutions: University of Chicago
- Doctoral students: Andrew Arato
- Notable works: The Rise of the West, Plagues and Peoples
- Influenced: John Lewis Gaddis, David Christian

William Hardy McNeill (October 31, 1917 – July 8, 2016) was an American historian and author, noted for his argument that contact and exchange among civilizations is what drives human history forward, first postulated in The Rise of the West (1963). He was the Robert A. Millikan Distinguished Service Professor Emeritus of History at the University of Chicago, where he taught from 1947 until his retirement in 1987. In 1980-81 he held the George Eastman Professorship at the University of Oxford.

== Early life and education ==
William McNeill was born in Vancouver, British Columbia, Canada, the son of theologian and educator John T. McNeill, where he lived until age ten. The family then moved to Chicago, while spending summers on a family farm on Canada's Prince Edward Island.

He earned a Bachelor of Arts degree in 1938 from the University of Chicago, where he was editor of the student newspaper and "was inspired by the anthropologist Robert Redfield". He earned a Master of Arts degree in 1939, also at the University of Chicago, and wrote his thesis on Thucydides and Herodotus. He began working towards a Ph.D. in history at Cornell University under Carl L. Becker. In 1941, he was drafted into the U.S. Army and served in World War II in the European theater. After the war, he returned to Cornell for his Ph.D., which he earned in 1947.

== Career ==
=== Teaching ===
In 1947, McNeill began teaching at the University of Chicago, where he remained throughout his teaching career. He chaired the university's Department of History from 1961 to 1967, establishing its international reputation. During his tenure as chair, he recruited Henry Moore to cast a bronze statue called Nuclear Energy commemorating the University of Chicago as the place where the world's first manmade nuclear chain reaction took place in 1942.

In 1988, he was a visiting professor at Williams College, where he taught a seminar on The Rise of the West. He has stated that teaching "is the most wonderful way to learn things". According to John W. Boyer, the University of Chicago's Dean and a former student of McNeill's, McNeill was "one of the most important historians to teach at the University of Chicago in the twentieth century". He retired from teaching in 1987 and moved to Colebrook, Connecticut.

=== Writing ===
McNeill's best-known work is The Rise of the West: A History of the Human Community, which was published in 1963, relatively early in his career. The book explored world history in terms of the effect different old world civilizations had on one another, and cites the deep influence of Western civilization on the rest of the world to argue that societal contact with foreign civilizations is the primary force in driving historical change. It had a major impact on historical theory by emphasizing cultural fusions, in contrast to Oswald Spengler's view of discrete, independent civilizations. Hugh Trevor-Roper wrote a glowing review in The New York Times Book Review. McNeill's Rise of the West won the U.S. National Book Award in History and Biography in 1964.

From 1971 to 1980, he served as the editor of The Journal of Modern History. His Plagues and Peoples (1976), was an important early contribution to the study of the impact of disease on human history. In 1982, he published The Pursuit of Power, which examined the role of military forces, military technology, and war in human history. In 1989, he published a biography of his mentor Arnold J. Toynbee.

In a 1992 review, he disagreed with Francis Fukuyama's argument in The End of History and the Last Man that the end of the Cold War meant that the American model of a capitalist liberal democracy had become the "final form of human government", as Fukuyama put it. In 1997, he disagreed with the central thesis of Jared Diamond's Guns, Germs, and Steel for overlooking the importance of human "cultural autonomy" in determining human development versus Diamond's focus on environmental factors. In 2003, he coauthored The Human Web: A Bird's-eye View of World History with his son and fellow historian J. R. McNeill.

== Awards and honours ==
In addition to being elected to the American Academy of Arts and Sciences and winning the U.S. National Book Award in History and Biography in 1964 for The Rise of the West, McNeill received several other awards and honours. He was elected to the American Philosophical Society in 1977. In 1985, he served as president of the American Historical Association. In 1996, McNeill won the prestigious Erasmus Prize, which the Crown Prince of the Netherlands Willem-Alexander presented to him at Amsterdam's Royal Palace. In 1999, Modern Library named The Rise of the West one of the 100 Best Nonfiction Books of the 20th century.

He received the Quantrell Award.

In February 2010, President Barack Obama, a former University of Chicago instructor himself, awarded McNeill the 2009 National Humanities Medal to recognize "his exceptional talent as a teacher and scholar at the University of Chicago and as an author of more than 20 books, including The Rise of the West: A History of the Human Community (1963), which traces civilizations through 5,000 years of recorded history". He wrote more than 20 books.

== Personal life ==
In 1946, McNeill married Elizabeth Darbishire, whom he met during his military service during World War II as an assistant military attaché to the Greek and Yugoslavian governments-in-exile in Cairo. She died in 2006. McNeill himself died in July 2016 at the age of 98 at Torrington, Connecticut.

== Works ==
- (1947). The Greek Dilemma War And Aftermath. London: J. B. Lippincott Company – via Internet Archive.
- (1949). History of Western Civilization: A Handbook. Chicago: University of Chicago Press. 6th edition, 1986. ISBN 978-0-226-56159-2.
- (1953) America, Britain and Russia, Their Co-operation and Conflict, 1941–1946, Oxford University Press, under the auspices of the Royal Institute of International Affairs, reprinted by Johnson Reprint Corporation, 1970
- (1954) Past and Future. Chicago: University of Chicago Press.
  - "The Introduction of the Potato into Ireland," The Journal of Modern History Vol. 21, No. 3, September 1949
- (1963). The Rise of the West: A History of the Human Community. Chicago: University of Chicago Press. Revised edition, 1991. ISBN 978-0-226-56141-7.
- (1964). Europe's Steppe Frontier: 1500–1800. Chicago: University of Chicago Press.
- (1973). The Ecumene: Story of Humanity. Harper & Row. ISBN 0065520424
- (1974). The Shape of European History. Oxford: Oxford University Press. ISBN 978-0-19-501807-3
- (1974). Venice: The Hinge of Europe, 1081–1797. Chicago: University of Chicago Press. ISBN 978-0-226-56149-3.
- (1976). Plagues and Peoples. Garden City, NY: Anchor Press/Doubleday. ISBN 978-0-385-12122-4.
- (1978). The Metamorphosis of Greece Since World War II . (University of Chicago Press)ISBN 978-0-226-56156-1.
- (1979). McNeill, W. H. (March 1979), "Historical Patterns of Migration (with comment & reply)", Current Anthropology, 20 (1): 95–102, doi:10.1086/202206, JSTOR 2741864, PMID 11630845
- (1980). The Human Condition: An Ecological and Historical View. Princeton: Princeton University Press. ISBN 978-0-691-05317-2
- (1982). The Pursuit of Power: Technology, Armed Force, and Society since A.D. 1000. Chicago: University of Chicago Press. ISBN 978-0-226-56157-8
- (1984). "Command vs market: Across the centuries", In: Craig. E. Aronoff, John L. Ward, dir. "The Future of Private Enterprise", Vol 1, Atlanta: Georgia State University, pp. 81–94
- (1989). Arnold J. Toynbee: A Life. Oxford: Oxford University Press. ISBN 978-0-19-506335-6
- (1991). Hutchins' University. A Memoir of the University of Chicago. 1929–1950. Chicago: University of Chicago Press. ISBN 978-0-226-56170-7
- (1992). The Global Condition: Conquerors, Catastrophes, & Community. Princeton: Princeton University Press. ISBN 978-0-691-08648-4
- (1995). Keeping Together in Time: Dance and Drill in Human History. Cambridge: Harvard University Press. ISBN 978-0-674-50229-1
- (1998). A World History. Oxford: Oxford University Press; 4th edition. (First published 1967). ISBN 978-0-19-511616-8
- (2003). The Human Web: A Bird's-Eye View of World History (with J. R. McNeill). New York: W. W. Norton. ISBN 978-0-393-92568-5
- (2005). Berkshire Encyclopedia of World History (with Jerry H. Bentley, David Christian et al., editors). 5 volumes. Great Barrington, MA: Berkshire Publishing Group. ISBN 978-0-9743091-0-1.
- (2005). The Pursuit of Truth: A Historian's Memoir. Lexington: University Press of Kentucky. ISBN 978-0-813-12345-5
- (2009). Summers Long Ago: On Grandfather's Farm and in Grandmother's Kitchen. Great Barrington, MA: Berkshire Publishing Group. ISBN 978-1-933782-71-3.
- (2011). Berkshire Encyclopedia of World History, 2nd Edition (with Jerry H. Bentley, David Christian et al., editors). 6 volumes. Great Barrington, MA: Berkshire Publishing Group. ISBN 978-1-933782-65-2.
