= James A. Rawley =

American historian (1916–2005)

- Born: November 19, 1916
- Died: November 29, 2005 (aged 89)
- Occupation: Historian

James A. Rawley (November 19, 1916 – November 29, 2005) was professor of history emeritus at the University of Nebraska–Lincoln. He was a specialist in the American Civil War, American race-relations and the life of Abraham Lincoln. His The Transatlantic Slave Trade: A History (1981) was updated by Stephen D. Behrendt in 2005. The James A. Rawley Prize (OAH) is given in his memory by the Organization of American Historians for the best book on race relations, and the James A. Rawley Prize (AHA) is given in his memory by the American Historical Association for the best book in Atlantic history.

== Selected publications ==
- Edwin D. Morgan: Merchant in Politics, 1811–83 (1955)
- "The Nationalism of Abraham Lincoln", Civil War History (1963)
- Turning Points of the Civil War (1966)
- Race and Politics: "Bleeding Kansas" and the Coming of the Civil War (1969)
- Lincoln and Civil War Politics (1969) (editor)
- The Politics of Union: Northern Politics during the Civil War (1974)
- The Transatlantic Slave Trade: A History (1981)
- Secession: The Disruption of the American Republic, 1844–61 (1990)
- Abraham Lincoln and a Nation Worth Fighting For (1996)
- London: Metropolis of the Slave Trade (2003)
