= Comparative history =

Literary genre

Comparative history is the comparison of different societies which existed during the same time period or shared similar cultural conditions.

The comparative history of societies emerged as an important specialty among intellectuals in the Enlightenment in the 18th century, as typified by Montesquieu, Voltaire, Adam Smith, and others. Sociologists and economists in the 19th century often explored comparative history, as exemplified by Alexis de Tocqueville, Karl Marx, and Max Weber.

In the first half of the 20th century, a large reading public followed the comparative histories of (German) Oswald Spengler, (Russian-American) Pitirim Sorokin, and (British) Arnold J. Toynbee. Since the 1950s, comparative history has faded from the public view and is now the domain of specialized scholars.

Besides the people mentioned above, recent exemplars of comparative history include American historians Herbert E. Bolton and Carroll Quigley, and British historian Geoffrey Barraclough. Several sociologists are also prominent in this field, including Barrington Moore, S. N. Eisenstadt, Seymour Martin Lipset, Charles Tilly, Stephen O. Murray, and Michael Mann.

Historians generally accept the comparison of particular institutions (banking, women's rights, ethnic identities) in different societies, but since the hostile reaction to Toynbee in the 1950s, generally do not pay much attention to sweeping comparative studies that cover wide swaths of the world over many centuries.

== Notable topics ==
=== Comparative studies of the Roman and Han empires ===
The ancient Chinese and Roman Empires are often compared due to their synchronous and analogous developments from warring states into universal empires.

=== Atlantic history ===
Atlantic history studies the Atlantic World in the early modern period. It is premised on the idea that, following the rise of sustained European contact with the New World in the 16th century, the continents that bordered the Atlantic Ocean—the Americas, Europe, and Africa—constituted a regional system or common sphere of economic and cultural exchange that can be studied as a totality.

Its theme is the complex interaction between Europe (especially Britain and France) and the New World colonies. It encompasses a wide range of demographic, social, economic, political, legal, military, intellectual and religious topics, comparing both sides of the Atlantic. Religious revivals characterized Britain and Germany, as well as the First Great Awakening in the American colonies. Migration and race/slavery have been important topics.

Although a relatively new field, it has stimulated numerous studies of comparative history especially regarding ideas, colonialism, slavery, economic history, and political revolutions in the 18th century in North and South America, Europe and Africa.

=== Modernization models ===
Beginning with German and French sociologists of the late 19th century, modernization models have been developed to show the sequence of transitions from traditional to modern societies, and indeed to postmodern societies. This research flourished especially in the 1960s, with Princeton University setting up seminars that compared the modernization process in China, Japan, Russia and other nations.

Modernization theory and history have been explicitly used as guides for countries eager to develop rapidly, such as China. Indeed, modernization has been proposed as the most useful framework for world history in China, because as one of the developing countries that started late, "China's modernization has to be based on the experiences and lessons of other countries."

=== Comparative politics ===
Comparative history often overlaps with political science's comparative politics subfield. This includes "transnational" history and sometimes also international history.

=== Comparative history of minorities ===
Mordechai Zaken compared two non-Muslim minorities in Kurdistan, the Jews and the Assyrian Christians in their relationships with their Muslim rulers and tribal chieftains during the 19th and 20th centuries. His comparative study gave a much clearer picture on the status of the minorities and their relationships with the ruling elites in and around Kurdistan. His PhD dissertation and the book upon which it was based have been widely spread and translated into the local languages in Kurdistan and the surrounding.

=== Military history ===
Military historians have often compared the organization, tactical and strategic ideas, leadership, and national support of the militaries of different nations.

Historians have emphasized the need to stretch beyond battles and generals to do more comparative analysis.

=== Slavery ===
The study of slavery in comparative perspective, ranging from the ancient world to the 19th century, has attracted numerous historians since the 1960s.

=== Economics ===
Much of economic history in recent years has been done by model-building economists who show occasional interest in comparative data analysis. Considerable work has been done by historians on the "Great Divergence" debate launched by Kenneth Pomeranz in 2009. At issue is why Europe moved forward rapidly after 1700 while Asia did not. More traditional research methodologies have been combined with econometrics, for example in the comparison of merchant guilds in Europe.

== Quantitative methods ==
Since the work of Sorokin, scholars in comparative history, especially if sociologists and political scientists, have often used quantitative and statistical data to compare multiple societies on multiple dimensions. There have been some efforts made to build mathematical dynamic models, but these have not come into the mainstream comparative history.

== See also ==
- Annales School
- Comparative historical research
- Comparative Studies in Society and History, a scholarly journal
- Universal history
- World history

== Bibliography ==
=== Historiography ===
- Barraclough; Geoffrey. Main Trends in History; Holmes & Meier, 1979 online version
- Cohen, Deborah and Maura O'Connor; Comparison and History: Europe in Cross-National Perspective. Routledge, 2004 online edition
- Cooper, Frederick. "Race, Ideology, and the Perils of Comparative History," American Historical Review, 101:4 (October 1996), 1122–1138. in JSTOR
- Detienne, Marcel. Comparing the Incomparable Stanford University Press (2008)
- Frederickson, George M. "From Exceptionalism to Variability: Recent Developments in Cross-National Comparative History." Journal of American History 82:2 (September 1995), 587–604. in JSTOR
- Guarneri, Carl. "Reconsidering C. Vann Woodward's The Comparative Approach to American History," Reviews in American History, Volume 23, Number 3, September 1995, pp. 552-563 doi:10.1353/rah.1995.0076
- Halperin, Charles J. et al. "AHR Forum: Comparative History in Theory and Practice: A Discussion." American Historical Review, 87:1 (February 1982), 123–143. in JSTOR
- Haupt, Heinz-Gerhard. "Comparative History," in Neil J. Smelser et al. eds. International Encyclopedia of Social and Behavioral Sciences (2001) 4:2397–2403.
- Hill, Alette Olin and Boyd H. Hill. "AHR Forum: Marc Bloch and Comparative History." The American Historical Review 85:4 (October 1980), 828–846. in JSTOR
- Hroch, Miroslav. Comparative Studies in Modern European History Ashgate Variorum 2007
- Iriye, Akire. "The Internationalization of History," American Historical Review Vol. 94, No. 1 (Feb., 1989), pp. 1–10 in JSTOR
- Kaelble, Hartmut. "Historical Comparison (english version)", Version: 2, in: Docupedia Zeitgeschichte, 15. November 2024
- Mazlish, Bruce. Conceptualizing Global History. Westview Press, 1993.
- McGerr, Michael. "The Price of the 'New Transnational History.'" American Historical Review 96:4 (October 1991), 1056–1067. in JSTOR
- Magnaghi; Russell M. Herbert E. Bolton and the Historiography of the Americas Greenwood Press, 1998 online edition
- Meritt, Richard L. and Stein Rokkan, editors. Comparing Nations: The Use of Quantitative Data in Cross-National Research. Yale University Press, 1966.
- Rusen, Jorn. "Some Theoretical Approaches to Intercultural Comparative Historiography." History and Theory 35:4 (December 1996), 5–22.
- Skocpol, Theda, and Margaret Somers. "The uses of comparative history in macrosocial inquiry." Comparative studies in society and history (1980) 22#2 pp: 174–197.
- Stoler, Ann L. "Tense and Tender Ties: The Politics of Comparison in North American History and (Post) Colonial Studies." Journal of American History (Dec 2001), 831–864. in JSTOR
- Tipps, Dean. "Modernization Theory and the Comparative Study of Societies: A Critical Perspective." Comparative Studies in Society and History 15:2 (1973), 199–226.
- Welskopp, Thomas: Comparative History, European History Online, Mainz: Institute of European History, 2010, retrieved: June 14, 2012.

=== Comparative and world histories ===
- Bayly, C. A. The Birth of the Modern World, 1780-1914 (2003)
- Black, Cyril Edwin. The dynamics of modernization: a study in comparative history (Harper & Row, 1966)
- Doyle, Michael W. Empires. Cornell University Press. 1986. online edition
- Eisenstadt, S.N. The Political Systems of Empires (1968),
- Gombrich, Ernst. "A Little History of the World" (1936 & 1995)
- Kennedy, Paul. The Rise and Fall of the Great Powers: Economic Change and Military Conflict from 1500 to 2000 (Random House, 1987)
- Klooster, Wim. Revolutions in the Atlantic World: A Comparative History (2009)
- Lieberman, Victor. Strange Parallels: Volume 2, Mainland Mirrors: Europe, Japan, China, South Asia, and the Islands: Southeast Asia in Global Context, c.800-1830 (2009)
- Mann, Michael. The sources of social power (1993)
- McNeill, William H. "The Rise of the West: A History the Human Community" (1963)
- Osterhammel, Jürgen. The Transformation of the World: A Global History of the Nineteenth Century (2014)
- Palmer, Robert R. Age of the Democratic Revolution: A Political History of Europe and America, 1760-1800 (2 vol 1966)
- Rosenberg, Emily, et al. eds. A World Connecting: 1870-1945 (2012)
- Smith, S.A. Revolution and the People in Russia and China: A Comparative History (2009)
- Sorokin; Pitirim A. Social Philosophies of an Age of Crisis. 1950 online edition
- Sorokin; Pitirim A. Social and Cultural Dynamics (4 vol 1932; one-vol. edn., 1959).
- Spengler; Oswald. The decline of the West 2 vol (1918)
- Tilly, Charles. Big Structures, Large Processes, Huge Comparisons. Russell Sage Foundation, 1984.
- Toynbee, Arnold J. A Study Of History 12 vol (1934–61); (2 vol abridgment 1957) online abridged version v. 1-6
- Voegelin, Eric. Order and History, 5 vol (1956–75)
- Woodward, C. Vann, ed. The Comparative Approach to American History (1968)
