= Journal of World History =

Peer-reviewed academic journal on History

- Discipline: World history
- Language: English
- Edited by: Laura J. Mitchell

Publication details
- History: 1990–present
- Publisher: University of Hawaii Press (United States)
- Frequency: Quarterly

Standard abbreviations
- ISO 4: J. World Hist.

Indexing
- CODEN: JWHIEC
- ISSN: 1045-6007 (print); 1527-8050 (web)
- LCCN: 90640778
- JSTOR: 10456007
- OCLC no.: 474784178

Links
- Journal homepage; Online access at Project MUSE

The Journal of World History is a peer-reviewed academic journal that presents historical analysis from a global point of view, focusing especially on forces that cross the boundaries of cultures and civilizations, including large-scale population movements, economic fluctuations, transfers of technology, the spread of infectious diseases, long-distance trade, and the spread of religious faiths, ideas, and values.

The journal was established in 1990 by Jerry H. Bentley at the University of Hawaiʻi to serve as the official journal of the World History Association. It is published by the University of Hawaiʻi Press. Initially produced twice a year, it became a quarterly in 2003.

In 2000, it was included in Project MUSE, which now contains archives going back to vol. 7 (1996). In 2009, it was included in JSTOR, with a moving wall of 3 years.

== See also ==
- Historic recurrence
- Journal of Global History
