= The Suppression of the African Slave-trade to the United States of America =

1894 thesis by W. E. B. Du Bois

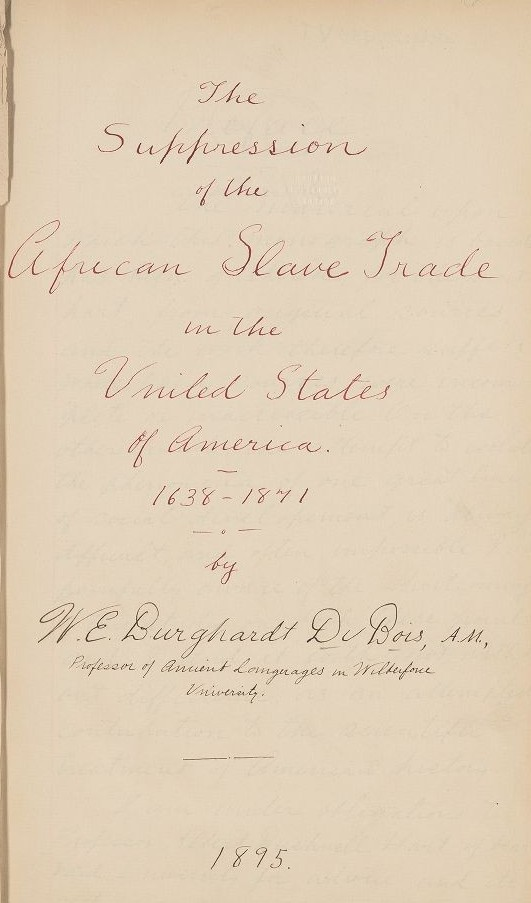
- Author: W. E. B. Du Bois
- Language: English
- Publication date: 1894

The Suppression of the African Slave-trade to the United States of America (1894) was W. E. B. Du Bois's doctoral thesis for Harvard University which he finished while teaching at Wilberforce University. This thesis made Du Bois the first African American to earn a Ph.D from Harvard.

Du Bois summarized the work this way:

The question of the suppression of the slave-trade is so intimately connected with the questions as to its rise, the system of American slavery, and the whole colonial policy of the eighteenth century, that it is difficult to isolate it, and at the same time to avoid superficiality on the one hand, and unscientific narrowness of view on the other. While I could not hope entirely to overcome such a difficulty, I nevertheless trust that I have succeeded in rendering this monograph a small contribution to the scientific study of slavery and the American Negro.

The work begins by examining the history of slavery in the Thirteen Colonies, including the Atlantic slave trade. It then discusses the role of slavery in the American Revolution, and how the institution of slavery was preserved in the fledgling United States by the Constitution Convention. The work then examines the Haitian Revolution, and the effect it had on U.S. slave owners in the American South. Du Bois concludes his work by analyzing the blockade of Africa and the role of slave-produced cotton in the U.S. economy prior to the American Civil War.

In 2014 the work was re-introduced with a new introduction by Henry Louis Gates Jr.
