= Philip D. Curtin =

American historian (1922 – 2009)

Philip Curtin
- Born: Philip Dearmond Curtin; May 22, 1922; Philadelphia, Pennsylvania, U.S.
- Died: June 4, 2009 (aged 87); West Chester, Pennsylvania, U.S.

Academic background
- Education: Swarthmore College; Harvard University

Academic work
- Discipline: History
- Sub-discipline: Africa and African slave trade
- Institutions: Johns Hopkins University; Swarthmore College; University of Wisconsin–Madison
- Doctoral students: Patrick Manning (historian)

Philip Dearmond Curtin (May 22, 1922 – June 4, 2009) was a professor at Johns Hopkins University and historian of Africa and the Atlantic slave trade. His most famous work, The Atlantic Slave Trade: A Census (1969) was one of the first estimates of the number of slaves transported across the Atlantic Ocean between the 16th century and 1870, yielding an estimate of 9,566,000 African slaves imported to the Americas. ( Current estimates are that about 12 million to 12.8 million Africans were shipped across the Atlantic over a span of 400 years.) He also wrote about how many Africans were taken and from what location, how many died during the Middle Passage, how many actually arrived in the Americas, and to what colonies/countries they were imported. Deirdre McCloskey has described Curtin as the "doyen of African economic historians."

== Biography ==
=== Early life and education ===
Curtin was born in Philadelphia on May 22, 1922, and grew up in Webster Springs, West Virginia, the site of a coal and timber company owned by his family. He attended Swarthmore College, where he was awarded a Bachelor of Arts degree during 1948, having had an interruption of three years while he served in the United States Merchant Marine during World War II, serving aboard ship as a radio operator. He did his graduate work at Harvard University, earning a Master of Arts degree during 1949 and was awarded his Ph.D. during 1953. His doctoral dissertation, titled "Revolution and Decline in Jamaica, 1830–1865" addressed 19th-century history and economics of Jamaica.

=== Academic career ===
After graduation, he began teaching at Swarthmore College where he remained until 1956. He relocated to the University of Wisconsin–Madison where he taught from 1956 through 1975. There, Curtin and fellow historian Jan Vansina established a department of African languages and literature during 1956, as part of one of the first academic African studies programs established at a college in the United States. From 1975 until the time of his death he was a member of the faculty of Johns Hopkins University .

Curtin was recognized in 1983 as a MacArthur Fellow, with its accompanying "genius grant". He published 19 books, which include Death by Migration: Europe's Encounter with the Tropical World in the Nineteenth Century, described by the American Historical Review (AHR) as "ground-breaking." In addition to the aforementioned calculation, he challenged the common opinion that improvements of medicine were responsible for the increased attempts at European colonization of Africa during the 19th century.

In his 1969 book The Atlantic Slave Trade: A Census, Curtin researched the sources of frequently used estimates of the number of individuals transported across the Atlantic Ocean by the slave trade. His analysis of shipping contracts and data from the ports of entry enabled him to estimate between 9 and 10 million individuals being transported on slave ships, with a margin of error of 20%, out of the 20 to 30 million that had been loaded aboard at ports in Africa. Prior to Curtin's research, estimates of the number of individuals brought from Africa as slaves ranged from 3.5 million to numbers as high as 100 million individuals. A widely cited number of 15 million slaves used by W. E. B. Du Bois, who had gotten the number from abolitionist Edward Dunbar. Another widely quoted estimate of 20 million slaves was based on calculations using data concerning slaves in Jamaica that was adjusted for the entire Atlantic slave trade, though the original data used to make the calculations has since been lost.

His 1989 book Death by Migration combined medical and population history, tracing the effects of tropical diseases on Europeans in tropical Africa during the time before medicines were available to treat these conditions effectively.

A controversial opinion piece published in a 1995 issue of The Chronicle of Higher Education titled "Ghettoizing African History" criticized the frequent equation of African and African American scholars in college and university departments of history with jobs concerning the history of Africa. Although Curtin mentioned that this practice might discourage some White academicians from specializing in African studies, his comments were also an argument for more opportunities for African-American scholars.

Gorée Island in Senegal, has been described as a site where as many as 20 million Africans were fattened for shipment across the Atlantic Ocean from the Slave House after being shackled there in dank cells. Curtin debunked the traditional account, stating that "[t]he whole story is phony". He argued that the Slave House, one of the most beautiful houses on the island, would not have been used for detaining slaves, that the rocks near the shore would make docking boats there perilous, and estimated that a total of no more than 50,000 slaves had passed through the island. Senegalese academics criticized Curtin's statement, stating that he was guilty of "stealing their history".

Books:

- Africa Remembered: Narratives by West Africans from the Era of the Slave Trade (editor, 1967)
- The Atlantic Slave Trade: A Census (1969)
- The Image of Africa: British Ideas and Action, 1780–1850 (1973, AHA Schuyler Prize)
- Africa and the West: Intellectual Responses to European Culture (1974)
- Precolonial African History (1975, AHA pamphlet)
- Economic Change in Precolonial Africa: Senegambia in the Era of the Slave Trade (1975)
- African History (co-author, 1978)
- Cross-Cultural Trade in World History (1984)
- Death by Migration: Europe’s Encounter with the Tropical World in the Nineteenth Century (1989)
- The Rise and Fall of the Plantation Complex: Essays in Atlantic History (1990)
- The Tropical Atlantic in the Age of the Slave Trade (1991, AHA pamphlet)
- Why People Move: Migration in African History (1995)
- Disease and Empire (1998)
- Migration and Mortality in Africa and the Atlantic World, 1700–1900 (2001)
- The World and the West (2002)
- On the Fringes of History: A Memoir (2005)

Doctoral Supervision (University of Wisconsin-Madison):

Doctoral Supervision (Johns Hopkins University):

=== Awards and honors ===
Curtin was elected to the American Philosophical Society in 1995.

=== Personal ===
A resident of Kennett Square, Pennsylvania, Curtin died at age 87 on June 4, 2009, in West Chester, Pennsylvania, with pneumonia cited as the cause of death. He was survived by his third wife, the former Anne Gilbert, as well as three sons and three grandchildren. His marriages to opera soprano singer Phyllis Curtin and Patricia Romero, who was also a historian of Africa, both ended in divorce.
