= Patrick Manning (historian) =

American historian (born 1941)

Patrick Manning (born June 10, 1941) is the Andrew W. Mellon Professor of World History, Emeritus, at the University of Pittsburgh. He is also president of the World History Network, Inc., a nonprofit corporation fostering research in world history. A specialist in world history and African history, his current research addresses global historiography, early human history, migration in world history, the African diaspora, and the demography of African slavery.

He was educated at the California Institute of Technology (BS in Chemistry, 1963) and the University of Wisconsin–Madison (MS in History and Economics, PhD in History 1969). He was trained as a specialist in the economic history of Africa, and went on to explore demographic, social, and cultural patterns in Africa and the African diaspora. Manning taught at Northeastern University, 1984–2006, where he directed the World History Center.

He served as Vice President of the Teaching Division of the American Historical Association, 2004–2006, and as President of the American Historical Association in 2016.

== Publications ==
- A History of Humanity: The Evolution of the Human System (Cambridge: Cambridge University Press, 2020). Theory and narrative of human social evolution.
- Methods for Human History: Studying Social, Cultural, and Biological Evolution (New York: Palgrave Macmillan, 2020).
- Migration in World History (London: Routledge; 3rd edition, 2020; 2nd edition, 2012; 1st edition, 2004). A concise survey of processes of migration in human history from early hominids until today. With Tiffany Trimmer.
- Knowledge in Translation: Global Patterns of Scientific Exchange, 1000 - 1800 CE(Pittsburgh: University of Pittsburgh Press, 2018). Co-editor, with Abigail E. Owen.
- Global Transformation in the Life Sciences, 1945-1980 (Pittsburgh: University of Pittsburgh Press, 2018). Co-editor, with Mat Savelli.
- Global Scientific Practice in an Age of Revolution. (Pittsburgh: University of Pittsburgh Press, 2016). Co-editor, with Daniel Rood.
- Big Data in History (Basingstoke, UK: Palgrave Macmillan, 2013).
- The African Diaspora: A History Through Culture (New York: Columbia University Press, 2009).
- World History: Global and Local Interactions (Princeton: Markus Wiener Publishers, 2005). Editor, with twelve contributions by new scholars in world history.
- Navigating World History: Historians Create a Global Past (New York: Palgrave Macmillan, 2003). A critical overview of the field of world history.
- Slave Trades, 1500–1800: Globalization of Forced Labour (Variorium: Aldershot, Great Britain, 1996). Volume 15 of An Expanding World, edited by A. J. Russell-Wood. (ed. and introduction).
- History from South Africa: Alternative Visions and Practices (Philadelphia: Temple University Press, 1991). Co-editor, along with Joshua Brown, Karin Shapiro, Jon Wiener, Belinda Bozzoli and Peter Delius, of this collection of articles, mostly written by South African authors.
- Slavery and African Life: Occidental, Oriental, and African Slave Trades (Cambridge: Cambridge University Press, 1990). A study of the impact of slave exports on African demography, economics, society, and ideology.
- Francophone Sub-Saharan Africa, 1880–1985 (Cambridge: Cambridge University Press, 1988; 2nd edition, revised & expanded, 1999).
- Slavery, Colonialism, and Economic Growth in Dahomey, 1638–1960 (Cambridge: Cambridge University Press, 1982). Finalist for the Herskovits Prize of the African Studies Association.
