= A. J. H. Latham =

British economic historian (born 1940)

- Born: Anthony John Heaton Latham; October 30, 1940 (age 85); Wigan, Lancashire
- Education: Merton College, Oxford; University of Birmingham
- Occupation: Economic Historian
- Spouse: Dawn Catherine Farleigh
- Children: 1

Anthony John Heaton Latham (born 30 October 1940) is an economic historian at University College of Swansea. He has specialised in the economic history of the developing world during the establishment of the global economy, and the trading of commodities within that economy.

== Early life and family ==
Anthony Latham was born in 1940 in Wigan, England, to Tom Heaton and Dorothy Latham née Williams. He was educated at Ashton-in-Makerfield Grammar School, and matriculated at Merton College, Oxford in 1959, but in November of the following year he took up a temporary appointment as a teacher in Salford. In 1961 he recommenced his studies, at the University of Birmingham. He married Dawn Catherine Farleigh in 1990 and in 2000, his son George was born.

He received his BA and his PhD from the University of Birmingham in 1964 and 1970, respectively.

He is a jazz clarinettist and contributor for Sandy Brown Jazz.

== Career ==
Latham spent his academic career at the University College of Swansea from 1967. He has specialised in the economic history of the developing world during the establishment of the global economy, and the trading of commodities within that economy.

== Selected publications ==
- "Currency, Credit and Capitalism on the Cross River in the Pre-Colonial Era", Journal of African History, Vol. 12 (1971), pp. 599–605.
- Old Calabar, 1600-1891: The Impact of the International Economy upon a Traditional Society. Clarendon Press, Oxford, 1973.
- The International Economy and the Undeveloped World, 1865–1914. Totowa, N.J.: Rowman and Littlefield, and Croom Helm, London. 1978.
- The International Market in Rice and Wheat 1868-1914. University of Illinois, Urbana-Champaign, 1981.
- "Palm Produce from Calabar, 1812- 1887, with a Note on the Formation of Palm Oil Prices to 1914", in Liesegang, Pasch and Jones (1986), pp. 265–91.
- Africa, Asia and South America since 1800: A Bibliographical Guide. Manchester University Press, Manchester, [1995]. ISBN 0719018773
- Rice: The Primary Commodity. Routledge, London, 1998. ISBN 0415151538
- The Depression and the Developing World, 1914-1939. Routledge, London, 2006.
