= World history (field) =

Study of history from a global perspective

World history or global history as a field of historical study examines history from a global perspective. It emerged centuries ago; some leading practitioners have included Voltaire (1694–1778), Hegel (1770–1831), Karl Marx (1818–1883), Oswald Spengler (1880–1936), and Arnold J. Toynbee (1889–1975). The field became much more active (in terms of university teaching, textbooks, scholarly journals, and academic associations) in the late 20th century.

It is not to be confused with comparative history, which, like world history, deals with the history of multiple cultures and nations, but not on a global scale. World historians use a thematic approach, with two major focal points: integration (how processes of world history have drawn people of the world together) and difference (how patterns of world history reveal the diversity of the human experience).

== Periodisation ==
World history in the Western tradition is commonly divided into three parts, viz. ancient, medieval, and modern time. The division between ancient and medieval periods is less sharp, or absent, in Arabic and Asian historiographies. A synoptic view of universal history led some scholars, beginning with Karl Jaspers, to distinguish the Axial Age as synchronous with "classical antiquity" in the Western tradition. Jaspers also proposed a more universal periodization—prehistory, history, and planetary history. All earlier periods belong to the second period (history), a relatively brief, transitory phase between two much longer periods.

== Establishment and perimeters of the field ==
"World history is not a thing, but an activity, and various physical forms of expression such as lectures, books, journal papers and classroom lessons are criteria for it. An historian, for instance, may point to a book and say 'that's a world history', even if they cannot elucidate why. 'World history' should thus be defined through an examination of the various forms of expression taken as its criteria, not apart from or prior to them."

— Marnie Hughes-Warrington (2005)

Jerry H. Bentley (2011) observed that "the term world history has never been a clear signifier with a stable referent", and that usage of the term overlaps with universal history, comparative history, global history, Big History, macro history, and transnational history, among others. Marnie Hughes-Warrington (2005) reasoned that "world history" is often mistaken to encompass the entire Earth, because works claiming to be "world histories" may have in practice a more limited scope, depending on the author's perspective: 'The "world" in world history (...) refers not to the earth in its entirety – both include and apart from human experience – but to the known and meaningful world of an individual or group.' David Christian (2010) stated that world-history scholarship had still been focused on the modern period, this being due to historians' preference for times when there was a great deal of documentary evidence; he contrasted this with the aim of universal history to include much longer timescales.

The advent of world history as a distinct academic field of study can be traced to the United States in the 1960s, but the pace quickened in the 1980s. A key step was the creation of the World History Association and graduate programs at a handful of American universities. Over the next decades, scholarly publications, professional and academic organizations, and graduate programs in World history proliferated. World history has often displaced Western Civilization in the required curricula of American high schools and universities, and is supported by new textbooks that take a world-history approach.

World history attempts to recognize and address two structures that have profoundly shaped professional history-writing:

1. A tendency to use current nation-states to set the boundaries and agendas of studies of the past.
2. A deep legacy of Eurocentric assumptions (found especially, but not only, in Western history-writing).

Seeking to escape the nation-state, global history aims to transcend national boundaries by examining larger scales, unburdened by spatial limitations. Thus, World history tends to study networks, connections, and systems that cross traditional boundaries of historical study like linguistic, cultural, and national borders. World history is often concerned with exploring social dynamics that have led to large-scale changes in human society, such as industrialization and the spread of capitalism, and with analysing how these changes have affected different parts of the world. Like other branches of history-writing in the second half of the twentieth century, world history has a scope far beyond historians' traditional focus on politics, wars, and diplomacy, taking in a panoply of subjects like gender history, social history, cultural history, and environmental history.

=== Organizations ===
- The H-World website and online network is used among some practitioners of world history, and allows discussions among scholars, announcements, syllabi, bibliographies, and book reviews.
- The International Society for the Comparative Study of Civilizations (ISCSC) approaches world history from the standpoint of comparative civilizations. Founded at a conference in 1961 in Salzburg, Austria, which was attended by Othmar Anderlie, Pitirim Sorokin, and Arnold J. Toynbee, this international association of scholars publishes a journal, Comparative Civilization Review. It hosts an annual meeting in cities worldwide.
- The Journal of Global History is a scholarly journal established in 2006 and is published by Cambridge University Press.
- The World History Association (WHA) was established in 1982, and is predominantly an American phenomenon. Since 1990, it publishes the Journal of World History oquarterly

== History ==
=== Pre-modern ===
The study of world history, as distinct from national history, has existed in many cultures worldwide. However, early forms of world history were not truly global and were limited to only the regions known by the historian.

In Ancient China, Chinese world history, that of China and the surrounding people of East Asia was based on the dynastic cycle articulated by Sima Qian c. 100 BC. Sima Qian's model is based on the Mandate of Heaven. Rulers rise when they unite China, only to be overthrown when their dynasty becomes corrupt. Each new dynasty begins virtuous and strong, but then decays, provoking the transfer of Heaven's mandate to a new ruler. The test of virtue in a new dynasty is success in being obeyed by China and neighboring barbarians. After 2000 years, Sima Qian's model still dominates scholarship, although the dynastic cycle is no longer used for modern Chinese history.

In Ancient Greece, Herodotus (5th century BC), as the founder of Greek historiography, presents discussions of the customs, geography, and history of Mediterranean peoples, particularly the Egyptians. His contemporary Thucydides rejected Herodotus's all-embracing approach to history, offering instead a more precise, sharply focused monograph, dealing not with vast empires over the centuries but with 27 years of war between Athens and Sparta. In Rome, the vast, patriotic history of Rome by Livy (59 BC – 17 AD) approximated Herodotean inclusiveness; Polybius (c. 200 – c. 118 BC) aspired to combine the logical rigor of Thucydides with the scope of Herodotus.

Rashīd al-Dīn Fadhl-allāh Hamadānī (1247–1318) was a Muslim physician from a Persian-speaking family, a polymathic writer, and historian, who wrote an enormous Islamic history, the Jami al-Tawarikh, in the Persian language, often considered a landmark in intercultural historiography and a key document on the Ilkhanids (13th and 14th century). His encyclopedic knowledge of cultures from Mongolia to China to the Steppes of Central Eurasia to Persia, the Arabic-speaking lands, and Europe provides the most direct access to information on the late Mongol era. His descriptions also highlight how the Mongol Empire's emphasis on trade fostered cultural and religious exchange and intellectual ferment, facilitating the transmission of ideas from East to West and vice versa.

One Muslim scholar, Ibn Khaldun (1332–1409) broke with traditionalism and offered a model of historical change in Muqaddimah, an exposition of the methodology of scientific history. Ibn Khaldun focused on the reasons for the rise and fall of civilizations, arguing that change lies in the economic and social structures of society. His work was largely ignored in the Muslim world.

=== Early modern ===
During the Renaissance in Europe, history was written about states or nations. The study of history changed during the Enlightenment and Romanticism. Voltaire described the history of certain ages that he considered important, rather than describing events in chronological order. History became an independent discipline. It was no longer called Philosophia Historiae but merely history (Historia). In the 18th century, Voltaire attempted to revolutionize the study of world history. First, Voltaire concluded that the traditional study of history was flawed. The Christian Church, one of the most powerful entities of his time, had presented a framework for the study of history. Voltaire, when writing History of Charles XII (1731) and The Age of Louis XIV (1751), instead focused on economics, politics, and culture. These aspects of history were mostly unexplored by his contemporaries and would each develop into their sections of world history. Above all else, Voltaire regarded truth as the most essential part of recording world history. Nationalism and religion only subtracted from objective truth, so Voltaire freed himself for their influence when he recorded history.

Giambattista Vico (1668–1744), an Italian, wrote Scienza Nuova seconda (The New Science) in 1725, which argued that history is the expression of human will and deeds. He thought that men are historical entities and that human nature changes over time. Each epoch should be seen as a whole in which all aspects of culture—art, religion, philosophy, politics, and economics—are interrelated (a point developed later by Oswald Spengler). Vico showed that myth, poetry, and art are entry points to discovering the true spirit of a culture. Vico outlined a conception of historical development in which great cultures, like Rome, undergo cycles of growth and decline. His ideas were out of fashion during the Enlightenment but influenced the Romantic historians after 1800.

A major theoretical foundation for world history was given by German philosopher Georg Wilhelm Friedrich Hegel, who saw the modern Prussian state as the latest (though often confused with the highest) stage of world development.

G.W.F. Hegel developed three lenses through which he believed world history could be viewed. Documents produced during a historical period, such as journal entries and contractual agreements, were considered by Hegel to be part of Original History. These documents are produced by a person enveloped within a culture, making them conduits of vital information but also limited in their contextual knowledge. Modern historians classify documents that pertain to Hegel's Original History as primary sources.

Reflective History, Hegel's second lens, involves using documents written with some temporal distance from the event, as discussed in academic writing. What limited this lens, according to Hegel, was the imposition of the writer's own cultural values and views on the historical event. This criticism of Reflective History was later formalized by Anthropologist Franz Boa and was coined "cultural relativism" by Alain Locke. Both of these lenses were considered to be partially flawed by Hegel.

Hegel termed the lens through which he advocated viewing world history "Philosophical History". To view history through this lens, one must analyze events, civilizations, and periods objectively. This way, the historian can extract the prevailing theme from their studies. This lens differs from the rest because it is void of any cultural biases and takes a more analytical approach to history. World History can be a broad topic, so focusing on extracting the most valuable information from certain periods may be the most beneficial approach. This third lens, as did Hegel's definitions of the other two, affected the study of history in the early modern and contemporary periods.

Another early modern historian was Adam Ferguson. Ferguson's main contribution to world history was An Essay on the History of Civil Society (1767). According to Ferguson, world history was a combination of two forms of history. One was natural history: the aspects of our world which God created. The other, which was more revolutionary, was social history. For him, social history was the progress humans made towards fulfilling God's plan for humanity. He believed that progress, achievable through individuals pursuing commercial success, would bring us closer to a perfect society, but we would never reach one. However, he also theorized that complete dedication to commercial success could lead to societal collapses—like what happened in Rome—because people would lose morality. Through this lens, Ferguson viewed world history as humanity's struggle to reach an ideal society.

Henry Home, Lord Kames was an Enlightenment philosopher who contributed to the study of world history. In his major historical work, Sketches on the History of Man, Kames outlined the four stages of human history which he observed. The first and most primitive stage was small hunter-gatherer groups. Then, to form larger groups, humans entered the second stage, during which they began to domesticate animals. The third stage was the development of agriculture. This new technology established trade and higher levels of cooperation among sizable groups of people, with people gathering into agricultural villages; laws and social obligations needed to be developed to maintain order. The fourth, and final stage, involved humans moving into market towns and seaports where agriculture was not the focus. Instead, commerce and other forms of labor arose in a society. By defining the stages of human history, Home influenced his successors. He also contributed to the development of other studies, such as sociology and anthropology.

The Marxist theory of historical materialism claims the history of the world is fundamentally determined by the material conditions at any given time – in other words, the relationships which people have with each other to fulfil basic needs such as feeding, clothing and housing themselves and their families. Overall, Marx and Engels claimed to have identified five successive stages of the development of these material conditions in Western Europe. The theory divides the history of the world into the following periods: Primitive communism; Slave society; Feudalism; Capitalism; and Socialism.

Regna Darnell and Frederic Gleach argue that in the Soviet Union, the Marxian theory of history was the only accepted orthodoxy, stifling research into other schools of historical thought. However, many adherents of Marx's theories argue that Stalin distorted Marxism.

=== 20th century ===
World history became a popular genre in the 20th century with universal history. In the 1920s, several best-sellers dealt with the history of the world, including surveys The Story of Mankind (1921) by Hendrik Willem van Loon and The Outline of History (1918) by H. G. Wells. Influential writers who have reached wide audiences include H. G. Wells, Oswald Spengler, Arnold J. Toynbee, Pitirim Sorokin, Carroll Quigley, Christopher Dawson, and Lewis Mumford. Scholars working the field include Eric Voegelin, William Hardy McNeill and Michael Mann. With evolving technologies such as dating methods and surveying laser technology called LiDAR, contemporary historians have access to new information which changes how past civilizations are studied.

Spengler's Decline of the West (2 vol 1919–1922) compared nine organic cultures: Egyptian (3400–1200 BC), Indian (1500–1100 BC), Chinese (1300 BC–AD 200), Classical (1100–400 BC), Byzantine (AD 300–1100), Aztec (AD 1300–1500), Arabian (AD 300–1250), Mayan (AD 600–960), and Western (AD 900–1900). His book was a success among intellectuals worldwide as it predicted the disintegration of European and American civilization after a violent "age of Caesarism", arguing by detailed analogies with other civilizations. It deepened the post-World War I pessimism in Europe, and was warmly received by intellectuals in China, India, and Latin America who hoped his predictions of the collapse of European empires would soon come true.

In 1936–1954, Toynbee's ten-volume A Study of History came out in three separate installments. He followed Spengler in taking a comparative topical approach to independent civilizations. Toynbee said they displayed striking parallels in their origin, growth, and decay. Toynbee rejected Spengler's biological model of civilizations as organisms with a typical life span of 1,000 years. Like Sima Qian, Toynbee explained decline as resulting from moral failure. Many readers rejoiced in his implication (in vols. 1–6) that only a return to some form of Catholicism could halt the breakdown of Western civilization, which began with the Reformation. Volumes 7–10, published in 1954, abandoned the religious message, and his popular audience shrank while scholars picked apart his mistakes.

McNeill wrote The Rise of the West (1963) to improve upon Toynbee by showing how the separate civilizations of Eurasia interacted from the very beginning of their history, borrowing critical skills from one another, and thus precipitating still further change as adjustment between traditional old and borrowed new knowledge and practice became necessary. McNeill took a broad approach organized around the interactions of people across the Earth. Such interactions have become both more numerous and more continual and substantial in recent times. Before about 1500, the network of communication between cultures was that of Eurasia. The terms for these areas of interaction differ from one world historian to another and include world-system and ecumene. The importance of these intercultural contacts has begun to be recognized by many scholars.

== History education ==
=== United States ===
As early as 1884, the American Historical Association advocated the study of the past on a world scale. T. Walter Wallbank and Alastair M. Taylor co-authored Civilization Past & Present, the first world-history textbook published in the United States (1942). With additional authors, this very successful work went through numerous editions up to the first decade of the twenty-first century. According to the Golden Anniversary edition of 1992, the ongoing objective of Civilization Past & Present "was to present a survey of world cultural history, treating the development and growth of civilization not as a unique European experience but as a global one through which all the great culture systems have interacted to produce the present-day world. It attempted to include all the elements of history – social, economic, political, religious, aesthetic, legal, and technological." Just as World War I strongly encouraged American historians to expand the study of Europe rather than courses on Western civilization, World War II enhanced the global perspectives, especially regarding Asia and Africa. Louis Gottschalk, William H. McNeill, and Leften S. Stavrianos became leaders in the integration of world history into the American College curriculum. Gottschalk began work on the UNESCO 'History of Mankind: Cultural and Scientific Development' in 1951. McNeill, influenced by Toynbee, broadened his work on the 20th century to new topics. Since 1982, the World History Association, in collaboration with several regional associations, has run a program to help history professors broaden their coverage in first-year courses; world history has become a popular replacement for courses on Western civilization. Professors Patrick Manning, at the University of Pittsburgh's World History Center, and Ross E. Dunn at San Diego State are leaders in promoting innovative teaching methods.

In related disciplines, such as art history and architectural history, global perspectives have also been promoted. In schools of architecture in the U.S., the National Architectural Accrediting Board now requires that schools teach history that includes a non-Western or global perspective. This reflects a decade-long effort to move past the standard Eurocentric approach that had dominated the field.

== Historiography ==
Universal history is at once something more and something less than the aggregate of the national histories to which we are accustomed, that it must be approached in a different spirit and dealt with in a different manner

— H. G. Wells, The Outline of History

=== Rankean historical positivism ===
The roots of historiography in the 19th century are bound up with the concept that history written with a strong connection to the primary sources could be integrated with "the big picture", i.e., to a general, universal history. For example, Leopold von Ranke, probably the pre-eminent historian of the 19th century, founder of Rankean historical positivism, the classic mode of historiography that now stands against postmodernism, attempted to write a Universal History at the close of his career. The works of world historians Oswald Spengler and Arnold J. Toynbee exemplify attempts to integrate primary source-based history and Universal History. Spengler's work is more general; Toynbee created a theory that would allow the study of "civilizations" to proceed with integration of source-based history writing and Universal History writing. Both writers attempted to incorporate teleological theories into general presentations of the history. Toynbee found the telos (goal) of universal history to be the emergence of a single World State.

=== Modernization theory ===
According to Francis Fukuyama, modernization theory is the "last significant Universal History" written in the 20th century. This theory draws on Marx, Weber, and Durkheim. Talcott Parsons's Societies. Evolutionary and Comparative Perspectives (1966) is a key statement of this view of world history.

=== African and world history ===
In recent years, the relationship between African and world history has shifted rapidly from one of antipathy to one of engagement and synthesis. Reynolds (2007) surveys the relationship between African and world histories, emphasizing the tension between the area-studies paradigm and the growing world-history emphasis on connections and exchange across regional boundaries. A closer examination of recent exchanges and debates over the merits of this exchange is also featured. Reynolds sees the relationship between African and world history as a measure of the changing nature of historical inquiry over the past century.

== See also ==
- Big History – Education strategy or academic discipline
- Macrohistory – Long-term trends in world history
- History – Study of the past
- Historic recurrence – Repetition of similar events in history
- History of globalization
- Political history of the world
- Bibliography of world history (field)
- Journal of Global History
- Journal of World History

== Works cited ==
- Cottinger, H. M. (1884). Elements of universal history for higher institutes in republics and for self-instruction.
- Eisenstadt, Samuel N. (1986). The Origins and Diversity of Axial Age Civilizations. New York: New York State University Press. ISBN 978-0887060960.
- Fukuyama, Francis (1992). The End of History and the Last Man. New York: The Free Press.
- Hughes-Warrington, Marnie (2005). Palgrave Advances in World Histories. New York: Palgrave MacMillan. p. 286. ISBN 9780230523401.
- Jaspers, Karl (1949). The Origin and Goal of History. London Yale University Press.
- Meer, Zubin (2011). Individualism: The Cultural Logic of Modernity. Lexington Books.
- Parsons, Talcott (1966). Societies: Evolutionary and Comparative Perspectives. Englewood Cliffs, N.J.: Prentice-Hall.
- Yerxa, Donald A. (2009). Recent Themes in World History and the History of the West: Historians in Conversation. Univ of South Carolina Press.
