= David Northrup (historian) =

American historian (born 1941)

David Northrup (born 1 May 1941) is emeritus professor of history at Boston College. He is the former president of the World History Association and in 2017 received their Pioneers in World History Award.

== Selected publications ==
- Seven Myths of Africa in World History. Indianapolis : Hackett Publishing Company, Inc. 2017 ISBN 9781624666391
- Africa's Discovery of Europe: 1450-1850. New York : Oxford UP, 2014. ISBN 9780199941216
- How English Became the Global Language. New York : Palgrave Macmillan, 2013 ISBN 9781137303059
- Crosscurrents in the Black Atlantic, 1770-1965: A Brief History with Documents. New York : Bedford/St. Martin's, 2010. ISBN 9780312442446
- Indentured Labor in the Age of Imperialism, 1834-1922 New York : Cambridge University Press, 1995 ISBN 9780521485197
- The Atlantic Slave Trade. Lexington: Heath, 1994. (2002, 2001) ISBN 9780669331455 (Editor)
- Beyond the Bend in the River: African Labor in Eastern Zaire, 1865-1940. Athens, Ohio : Ohio University Center for International Studies, 1988. ISBN 9780896801516
- Trade Without Rulers: Pre-Colonial Economic Development in South-Eastern Nigeria. Oxford : Clarendon Press, 1978 ISBN 9780198227120
