= World History Association =

American and global academic membership association

The World History Association (WHA) is an academic organization that promotes the study of world history in high school and university. It was founded in 1982 to promote the study of history in a global context, identifying patterns and connections between world events. Its membership is global. Its world headquarters has been located in Brookline, Massachusetts, United States, since late 2025. Previously it was situated at Northeastern University in Boston, Massachusetts, and at the University of Hawai'i Manoa.

The Association holds annual conferences at sites in the United States and throughout the world. It issues three peer-reviewed publications free to all current members: the Journal of World History (quarterly--in paper and digitally), World History Bulletin (semi-annually and digitally), and World History Connected (annually and digitally).

== Collaborations ==
The WHA was involved in the creation of an AP World History course, launched in the 2001–2002 school year, although beginning in 2010 and again in 2018, the WHA voiced concerns about the College Board's decision to truncate the course chronologically. More recently the organization has partnered with Open Education Resources (OER) to develop world history curriculum materials. It also collaborates with History for the 21st Century (H/21), which creates curricula for courses centred on world history.

== Affiliates ==
Regional affiliates of the World History Association include:

- The Midwest World History Association (MWWHA)
- Southeast World History Association (SEWHA)
- World History Association of Texas (WHAT)
- Northwest World History Association (NWWHA)
- New England Regional World History Association (NERWHA)
- Mid-Atlantic World History Association (MAWHA)
- World History Association of Hawai'i (WHAH)
- Mountain West World History Association (MTWWHA)

The World History Association has been an affiliated society of the American Historical Association since 1983. It has been a member society of the American Council of Learned Societies since 2011.

== Presidents ==
Category:Presidents of the World History Association

- 2026-2027 Ruth Mostern
- 2024-2025 Trevor R. Getz
- 2022-23 Jonathan T. Reynolds
- 2020-2021 Laura J. Mitchell
- 2017 - 2019 Merry Wiesner-Hanks
- 2016-2017 Rick Warner
- 2014-15 Craig Benjamin
- 2012-2014 Marc Jason Gilbert
- 2010 – 2011 Alfred Andrea
- 2008-2009 Anand A. Yang
- 2006-2007 Michele Forman
- 2004-2005 David Northrup
- 2003-2004 Ralph C. Croizier
- 2000-2002 Carter Findley
- 1998-1999 Heidi Roupp
- 1996-1997 Judith P. Zinsser
- 1994-96 John A. Mears
- 1992-1993 Ray Lorantas
- 1990-1991 Marilynn Jo Hitchens
- 1988 – 1989 Arnold Schrier
- 1986 – 1987 Kevin Reilly
- 1984 – 1985 (First elected president) Ross E. Dunn
- 1982 – 1983 (pro tem) Kevin Reilly
