= Ibn al-Hajj al-Abdari =

Maliki fiqh scholar (c.1250–1336)

Mohamed Ibn al-Hajj al-Abdari محمد إبن الحاج العبدري
- Title: Ibn al-Haj

Personal life
- Born: c. 1250–1256 Fez, Marinid Sultanate
- Died: 1336 Qarafa, Mamluk Sultanate
- Resting place: Qarafa
- Notable work: al-Madkhal
- Education: al-Qarawiyyin

Religious life
- Religion: Islam
- Jurisprudence: Maliki

Muslim leader
- Influenced by: al-Ghazali, Ibn Abi Jamra

Moḥammed ibn al-Hajj al-Abdari al-Fasi (or Mohammed Ibn Mohammed ibn Mohammed Abu Abdallah Ibn al-Hajj al-Abdari al-Maliki al-Fassi; Arabic: إبن الحاج العبدري الفاسي) also known simply as Ibn al-Haj or Ibn al-Hajj was a Maghrebi Maliki scholar and theologian writer. Originally from Fes (in present-day Morocco), he would finish his life in Egypt, where he died in 1336. He is most remembered for his famous book "al-Madkhal".

== Biography ==
Ibn al-Haj studied under many scholars of high standing in various cities and provinces, including Tunis, Al-Qairawan, Alexandria, Cairo, in addition to Madinah and Makkah.

Ibn al-Haj al-Abdari wrote Madkhal Ash-Shara Ash-Shareef Ala Al-Mathahib (Introduction to Islamic Jurisprudence According to Schools of Thought). The book was published in 4 volumes of over 300 large pages each. It treats many different subjects. In the first volume the author includes 22 chapters, each addressing one question where practice is at variance with Islamic teachings. He scrutinizes the practice and points out the proper way to follow. Thus we have chapters on intention, pursuing knowledge, prayer, the position of a mosque as a place of education, offering prayers at home, the behavior of scholars during scholarly debate, etc. The second volume has 62 chapters with a similar number of questions, including the Prophet's birthday, the position of Madinah, the manners to be followed by students, women's behavior, etc. The whole book is written in this way, without any particular thread for the arrangement of its chapters and questions. It is not a book on Fiqh in the usual sense, nor is it a book of education and its methods, or a book of Hadith or Qur'anic commentary, but it includes something of all these disciplines. His views are very much influenced by al-Ghazali's Ihya’ ‘Ulum al-Din. He spent much of his life in Tunis and Egypt and, for some time, taught at the university of Fes, Al-Qarawiyyin. He was buried in Qarafa (Egypt).

He is not to be confused with Mohammed al-Abdari al-Hihi (full name :Abu Abdallah Mohammed ibn Mohammed ibn Ali ibn Ahmed ibn Masoud ibn Hajj al-Abdari al-Hihi, fl. ca. 1289) who wrote accounts of his travels. That writer is the author of The Moroccan Journey (Al-Rihlah al-Magribiyyah), an account of his journey to Mecca in 1289.
