= Rihla =

Genre of Arabic travel literature

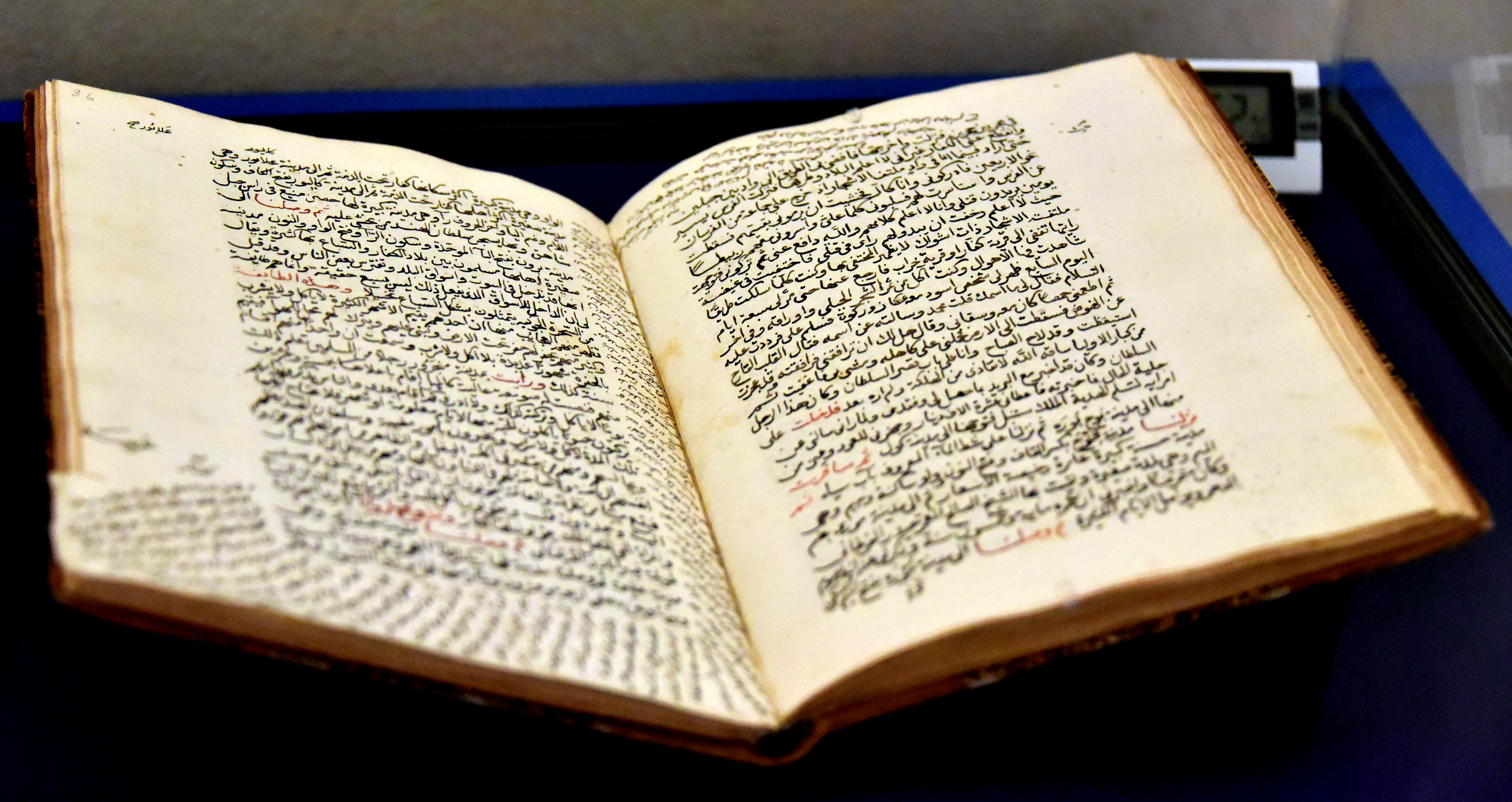
An 1836 copy made in Cairo of selected parts of Ibn Battuta's Riḥla

Riḥla (Arabic: رحلة) refers to both a journey and the written account of that journey, or travelogue. It constitutes a genre of Arabic literature. Associated with the medieval Islamic notion of "travel in search of knowledge" (الرحلة في طلب العلم), the riḥla as a genre of medieval and early-modern Arabic literature usually describes a journey taken with the intent of performing the Hajj, but can include an itinerary that vastly exceeds that original route. The classical riḥla in medieval Arabic travel literature, like those written by Ibn Battuta (known commonly as The Rihla) and Ibn Jubayr, includes a description of the "personalities, places, governments, customs, and curiosities" experienced by the traveler, and usually within the boundaries of the Muslim world. However, the term rihla can be applied to other Arabic travel narratives describing journeys taken for reasons other than pilgrimage; for instance, the 19th–century riḥlas of Muhammad as-Saffar and Rifa'a al-Tahtawi both follow conventions of the riḥla genre by recording not only the journey to France from Morocco and Egypt, respectively, but also their experiences and observations.

== As travel ==
The Rihla travel practice originated in Middle Ages Morocco and served to connect Muslims of Morocco to the collective consciousness of the ummah across the Islamic world, thereby generating a larger sense of community. Rihla consists of three types:

1. Rihla — journey within Morocco, typically to meet with other pilgrims before traveling beyond the local area.
2. Rihla hijaziyya - journey to the Hejaz which would be transmitted via an oral or written report.
3. Rihla sifariyya — journey to foreign lands including to embassies and missions in territories in Dar al-Harb. Events on these journeys would be the basis of the extant travel literature.

The performance of Rihla was considered in Moorish al-Andalus as a qualifier for teachers and political leaders. These journeys also coincided with the end of the Mongol invasions and a new opportunity for Islamic expansion.

== As literature ==
The travel narratives of Ibn Jubayr and Ibn Battuta are perceived as "archetypical exponents of the flowering of [the riḥla] genre," but should not be perceived as its founders. Concerning Ibn Jubayr's voyage to Mecca in 1183, one writer claimed that "...his two-year journey made a considerable impact on literary history. His account of his travels and tribulations in the East served as the foundational work of a new genre of writing, the rihla, or the creative travelogue: a mix of personal narrative, description, opinion and anecdote. In following centuries, countless people emulated and even plagiarized him." Travel narratives were written prior to Ibn Jubayr's; for example, the 12th–century riḥla of Abu Bakr ibn al-Arabi, and accounts of foreign lands visited by merchants and diplomats (such as the 9th century accounts of India and China by Abu Zayd al-Sirafi, and the 10th–century riḥla by Ibn Fadlan with the Abbasid mission to the Volga) long predate Ibn Jubayr's travelogue.

The best-known rihla narrative is Ibn Battuta's Masterpiece to Those Who Contemplate the Wonders of Cities and the Marvels of Travelling (تحفة النظار في غرائب الأمصار وعجائب الأسفار, or Tuḥfat an-Nuẓẓār fī Gharāʾib al-Amṣār wa ʿAjāʾib al-Asfār), often referred to as the Travels of Ibn Battuta (رحلة ابن بطوطة, or Riḥlat Ibn Baṭūṭah). The Travels was dictated to Ibn Juzayy on orders from the Marinid Sultan Abu Inan Faris, who was impressed by the story of Ibn Battuta. Although Ibn Battuta was an accomplished and well-documented explorer, his travels had been unknown outside the Islamic world for many years.

The Rihla of Abdallah al-Tijani describes his 970-day round trip from Tunis to Tripoli between 1306 and 1309.

== See also ==
- Journey to Mecca (2009 film)
