= Ibn Battuta =

Maghrebi traveller and scholar (1304–1368/1369)

Shaykh Ibn Battuta
- ابن بطوطة
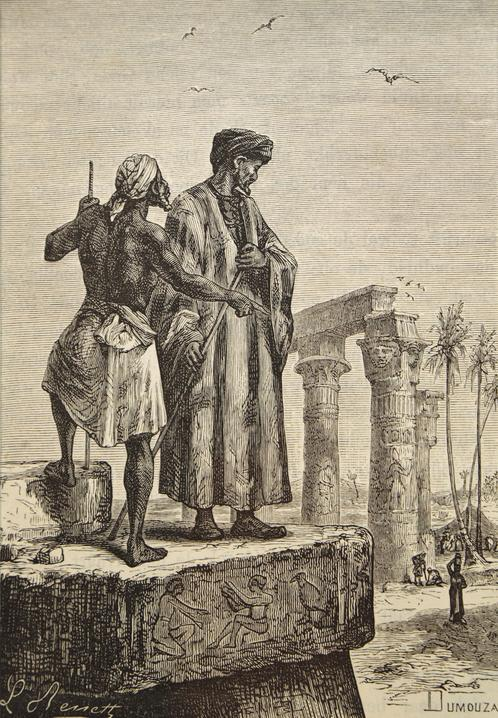
- 1878 illustration by Léon Benett showing Ibn Battuta (centre) and his guide (left) in Egypt
- Born: 24 February 1304; Tangier, Marinid sultanate
- Died: 1369 (aged 64–65); Marrakesh, Marinid sultanate
- Other name: The Islamic Marco Polo
- Occupations: Traveller; geographer; explorer; scholar; judge
- Era: Post-classical history
- Notable work: Rihla
- Arabic name
- Personal (Ism): Muḥammad مُحَمَّد
- Patronymic (Nasab): ibn ʿAbd Allāh ibn Muḥammad ibn Ibrāhīm ibn Muḥammad ibn Yūsuf ibn Baṭṭūṭah ابن عبد الله بن محمد بن إبراهيم بن محمد بن يوسف بن بطوطة
- Teknonymic (Kunya): ʾAbū ʿAbd Allāh أبو عبد الله
- Epithet (Laqab): Shams al-Dīn شمس الدين

Ibn Battuta (Note: Arabic: ابن بطوطة, romanized: Ibn Baṭṭūṭa Full name: Shams al-Dīn Abū ʿAbd Allāh Muḥammad ibn ʿAbd Allāh ibn Muḥammad ibn Ibrāhīm ibn Muḥammad ibn Ibrāhīm ibn Yūsuf al-Lawātī al-Ṭanji Arabic: شمس الدين أبو عبد الله محمد بن عبد الله بن محمد بن إبراهيم بن محمد بن إبراهيم بن يوسف اللواتي الطنجي) (/ˌɪbən bætˈtuːtɑː/; 24 February 1304–1368/1369) was a Maghrebi Muslim traveller, explorer, and scholar from Tangier, Morocco. Over a 30-year period (1325–1354) he visited much of Africa, Asia, and the Iberian Peninsula. Near the end of his life, Ibn Battuta dictated an account of his journeys, titled A Gift to Those Who Contemplate the Wonders of Cities and the Marvels of Travelling, commonly known as The Rihla.

Ibn Battuta travelled more than any other explorer in pre-modern history, totalling around 117,000 km (73,000 mi), surpassing Zheng He with about 50,000 km (31,000 mi) and Marco Polo with 24,000 km (15,000 mi).

== Name ==
Ibn Battuta's name in MS Arabe 2291, believed to be an autograph manuscript of The Riḥla.

"Ibn Battuta" is a patronymic, literally meaning 'son of a duckling'. His most common full name is given as Abu Abdullah Muhammad ibn Battuta. In his travelogue, The Rihla, he gives his full name as "Shams al-Din Abu ’Abdallah Muhammad ibn ’Abdallah ibn Muhammad ibn Ibrahim ibn Muhammad ibn Yusuf Lawati al-Tanji ibn Battuta".

== Early life ==
A miniature from al-Wasiti's Maqamat al-Hariri of pilgrims on a hajj

All that is known about Ibn Battuta's life comes from the autobiographical information included in the account of his travels, which records that he was of Arabised Berber descent, born into a family of Islamic legal scholars (known as qadis in the Muslim traditions of Morocco) in Tangier on 24 February 1304, during the reign of the Marinid dynasty. His family belonged to a Berber tribal clan known as the Lawata. As a young man, he would have studied at a Sunni Maliki school, the dominant form of education in North Africa at that time. Maliki Muslims requested that Ibn Battuta serve as their religious judge, as he was from an area where it was practised.

== Journeys ==
=== Itinerary, 1325–1332 ===
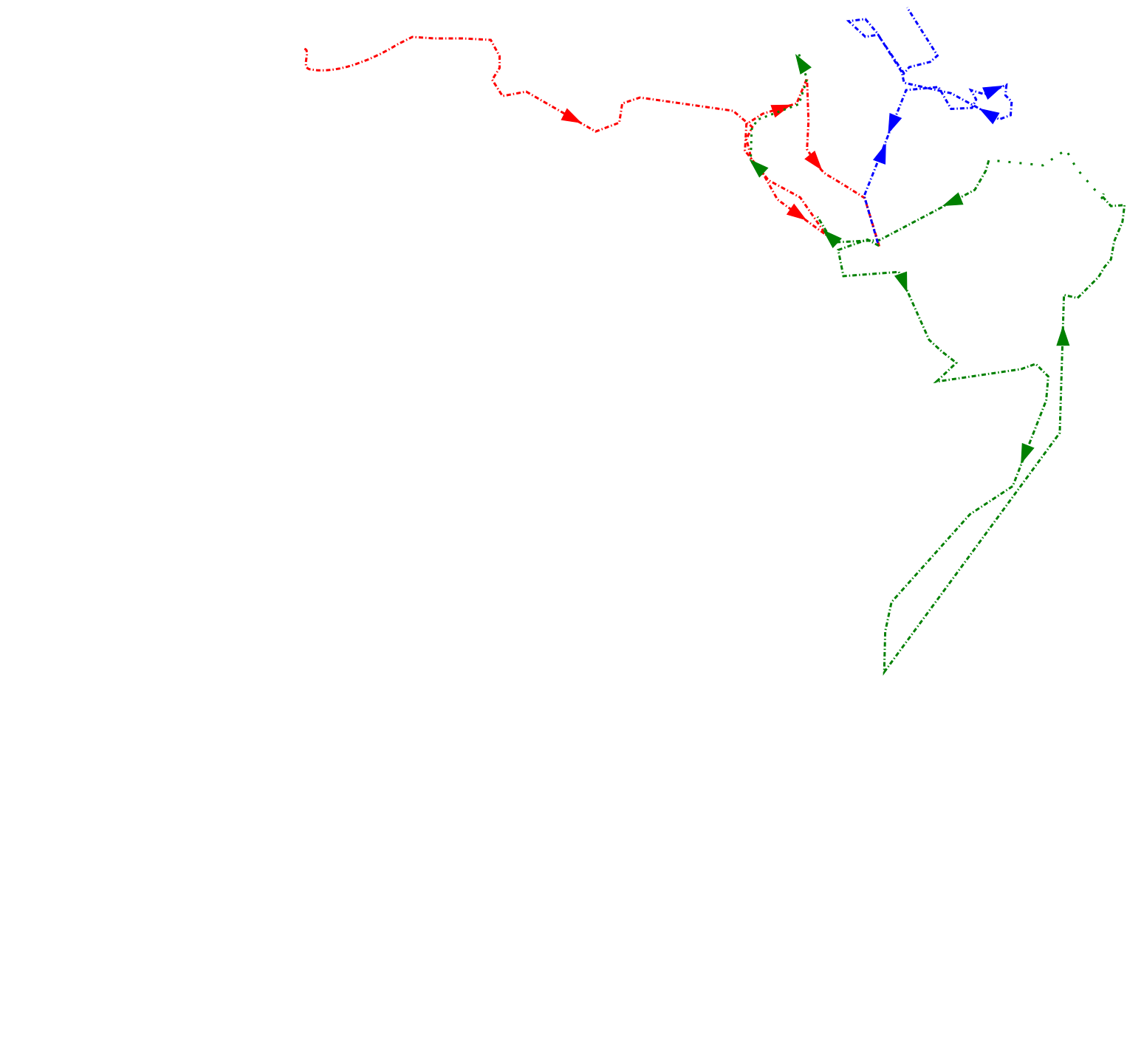
Ibn Battuta Itinerary 1325–1332 (North Africa, Iraq, Iran, the Arabian Peninsula, Somalia, Swahili Coast)

==== First pilgrimage ====
On 2 Rajab 725 AH (14 June 1325 AD), Ibn Battuta set off from his home town at the age of 21 to perform a hajj (pilgrimage) to Mecca, a journey that would ordinarily take sixteen months. He was eager to learn more about far-away lands and craved adventure. He would not return to Morocco again for 24 years.

I set out alone, having neither fellow-traveler in whose companionship I might find cheer, nor caravan whose part I might join, but swayed by an overmastering impulse within me and a desire long-cherished in my bosom to visit these illustrious sanctuaries. So I braced my resolution to quit my dear ones, female and male, and forsook my home as birds forsake their nests. My parents being yet in the bonds of life, it weighed sorely upon me to part from them, and both they and I were afflicted with sorrow at this separation.

He travelled to Mecca overland, following the North African coast across the sultanates of Abd al-Wadid and Hafsid. The route took him through Tlemcen, Béjaïa, and then Tunis, where he stayed for two months. For safety, Ibn Battuta usually joined a caravan to reduce the risk of being robbed. He took a bride in the town of Sfax, but soon left her due to a dispute with the father. That was the first in a series of marriages that would feature in his travels.

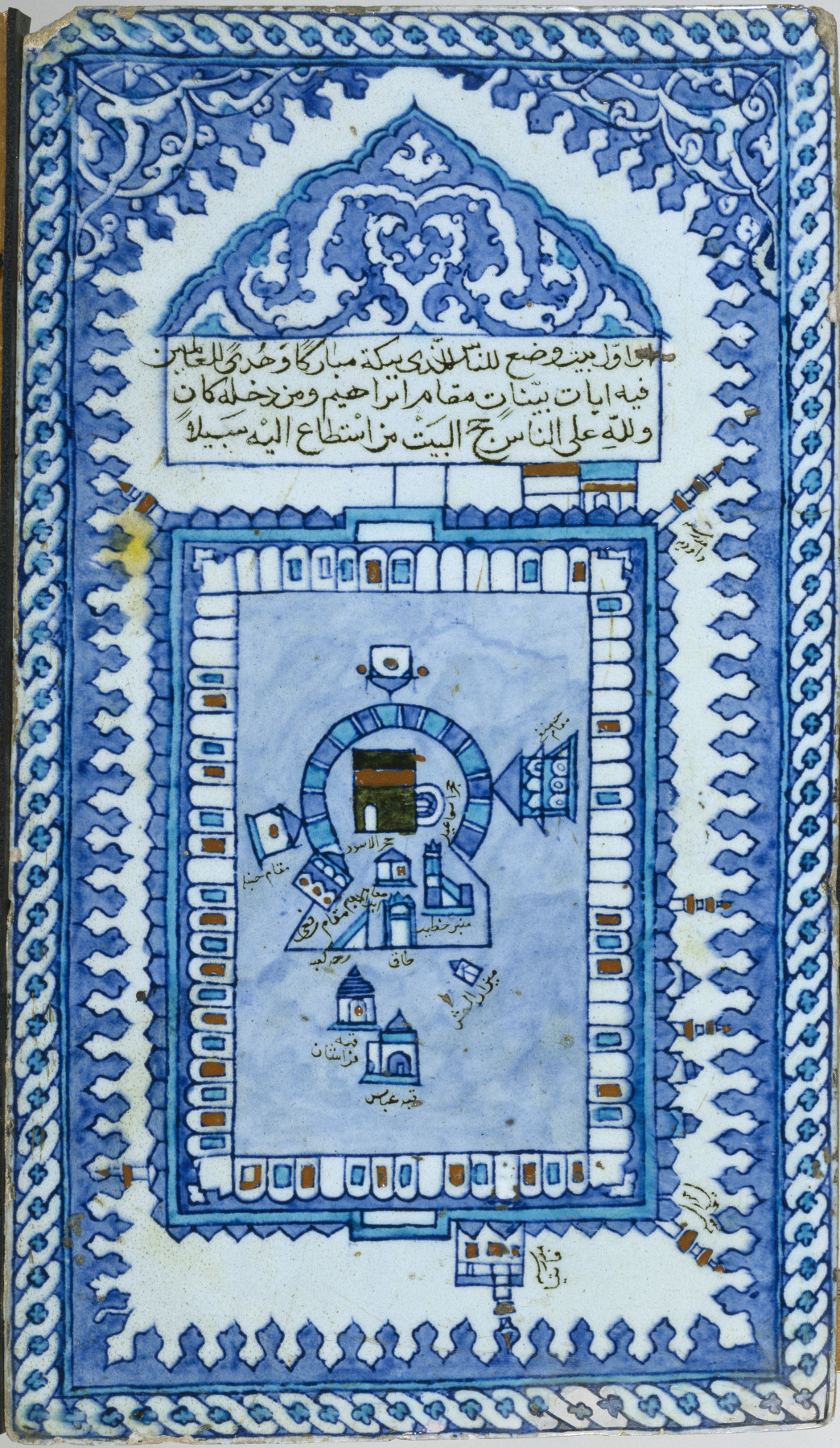
Ottoman 17th-century tile depicting the Kaaba, in Mecca

In the early spring of 1326, after a journey of over 3,500 km (2,200 mi), Ibn Battuta arrived at the port of Alexandria, at the time part of the Bahri Mamluk empire. He met two ascetic pious men in Alexandria. One was Sheikh Burhanuddin, who is supposed to have foretold the destiny of Ibn Battuta as a world traveller and told him, "It seems to me that you are fond of foreign travel. You must visit my brother Fariduddin in India, Rukonuddin in Sind, and Burhanuddin in China. Convey my greetings to them." Another pious man, Sheikh Murshidi, interpreted a dream of Ibn Battuta as being that he was meant to be a world traveller.

He spent several weeks visiting sites in the area, and then headed inland to Cairo, the capital of the Mamluk Sultanate. After spending about a month in Cairo, he embarked on the first of many detours within the relative safety of Mamluk territory. Of the three usual routes to Mecca, Ibn Battuta chose the least-travelled, which involved a journey up the Nile valley, then east to the Red Sea port of ʿAydhab. (Note: Aydhad was a port on the west coast of the Red Sea at 22°19′51″N 36°29′25″E.) Upon approaching the town, however, a local rebellion forced him to turn back.

Ibn Battuta returned to Cairo and took a second side trip, this time to Mamluk-controlled Damascus. During his first trip he had encountered a holy man who prophesied that he would only reach Mecca by travelling through Syria. The diversion held an added advantage; because of the holy places that lay along the way, including Hebron, Jerusalem, and Bethlehem, the Mamluk authorities kept the route safe for pilgrims. Without this help many travellers would be robbed and murdered. (Note: Ibn Battuta left Cairo on around 16 July 1326 and arrived in Damascus three weeks later on 9 August 1326. He described travelling on a complicated zig-zag route across Palestine in which he visited more than twenty cities. Such a journey would have been impossible in the allotted time and both Gibb (1958) and Hrbek (1962) have argued that Ibn Battuta conflated this journey with later journeys that he made in the region. Elad (1987) has shown that Ibn Battuta's descriptions of most of the sites in Palestine were not original but were copied (without acknowledgement) from the earlier rihla by the traveller Mohammed al-Abdari. Because of these difficulties, it is not possible to determine an accurate chronology of Ibn Battuta's travels in the region.)

After spending the Muslim month of Ramadan, during August, in Damascus, he joined a caravan travelling the 1,300 km (810 mi) south to Medina, site of the Mosque of the Islamic prophet Muhammad. After four days in the town, he journeyed on to Mecca while visiting holy sites along the way; upon his arrival to Mecca he completed his first pilgrimage, in November, and he took the honorific status of El-Hajji. Rather than returning home, Ibn Battuta decided to continue travelling, choosing as his next destination the Ilkhanate, a Mongol Khanate, to the northeast.

==== Iraq and Iran ====
On 17 November 1326, following a month spent in Mecca, Ibn Battuta joined a large caravan of pilgrims returning to Iraq across the Arabian Peninsula. The group headed north to Medina and then, travelling at night, turned northeast across the Najd plateau to Najaf, on a journey that lasted about two weeks. In Najaf, he visited the mausoleum of Ali, the Fourth Caliph.

Then, instead of continuing to Baghdad with the caravan, Ibn Battuta started a six-month detour that took him into Iran. From Najaf, he journeyed to Wasit, then followed the river Tigris south to Basra. His next destination was the town of Isfahan across the Zagros Mountains in Iran. He then headed south to Shiraz, a large, flourishing city spared the destruction wrought by Mongol invaders on many more northerly towns. Finally, he returned across the mountains to Baghdad, arriving there in June 1327. Parts of the city were still ruined from the damage inflicted by Hulagu Khan's invading army in 1258.

In Baghdad, he found Abu Sa'id, the last Mongol ruler of the unified Ilkhanate, leaving the city and heading north with a large retinue. Ibn Battuta joined the royal caravan for a while, then turned north on the Silk Road to Tabriz, the first major city in the region to open its gates to the Mongols and by then an important trading centre as most of its nearby rivals had been razed by the Mongol invaders.

Ibn Battuta left again for Baghdad, probably in July, but first took an excursion northwards along the river Tigris. He visited Mosul, where he was the guest of the Ilkhanate governor, and then the towns of Cizre (Jazirat ibn 'Umar) and Mardin in modern-day Turkey. At a hermitage on a mountain near Sinjar, he met a Kurdish mystic who gave him some silver coins. (Note: Most of Ibn Battuta's descriptions of the towns along the Tigris are copied from Ibn Jabayr's Rihla from 1184.) Once back in Mosul, he joined a "feeder" caravan of pilgrims heading south to Baghdad, where they would meet up with the main caravan that crossed the Arabian Desert to Mecca. Ill with diarrhoea, he arrived in the city weak and exhausted for his second hajj.

==== Arabia ====
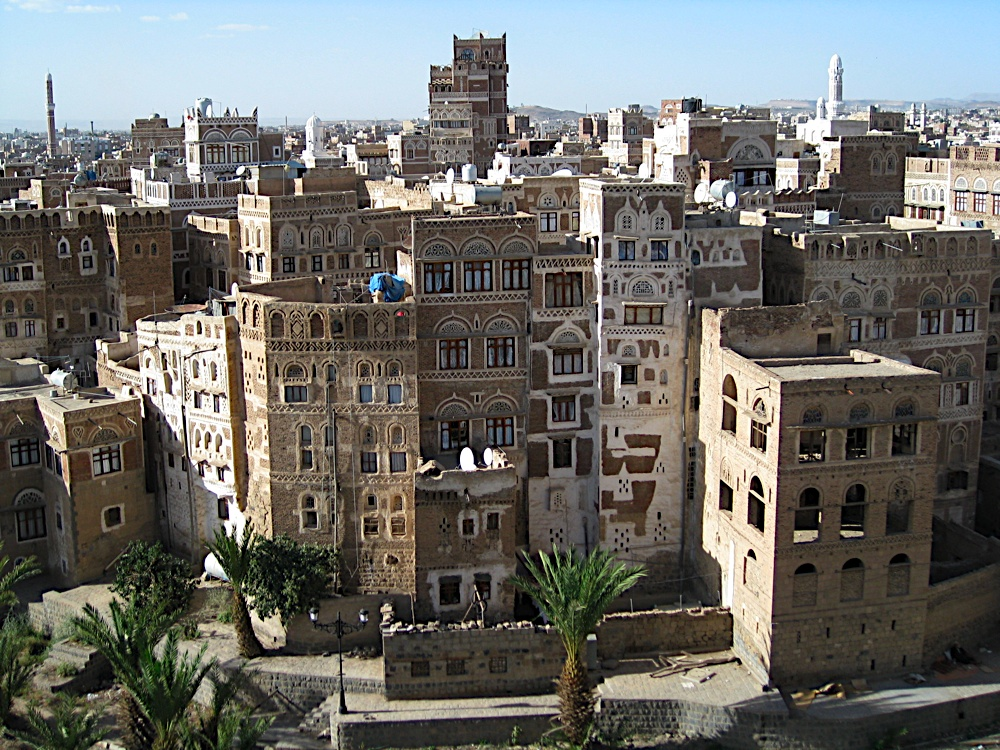
Old City of Sanaa, Yemen

Ibn Battuta remained in Mecca for some time (the Rihla suggests about three years, from September 1327 until autumn 1330). Problems with chronology, however, lead commentators to suggest that he may have left after the 1328 hajj. (Note: Ibn Battuta states that he stayed in Mecca for the hajj of 1327, 1328, 1329 and 1330 but gives comparatively little information on his stays. After the hajj of 1330 he left for East Africa, arriving back again in Mecca before the 1332 hajj. He states that he then left for India and arrived at the Indus river on 12 September 1333; however, although he does not specify exact dates, the description of his complex itinerary and the clues in the text to the chronology suggest that this journey to India lasted around three years. He must have therefore either left Mecca two years earlier than stated or arrived in India two years later. The issue is discussed by Gibb 1962, pp. 528–537 Vol. 2, Hrbek 1962 and Dunn 2005, pp. 132–133.)

After the hajj in either 1328 or 1330, he made his way to the port of Jeddah on the Red Sea coast. From there he followed the coast in a series of boats (known as a jalbah, these were small craft made of wooden planks sewn together) making slow progress against the prevailing south-easterly winds. Once in Yemen he visited Zabīd and later the highland town of Taiz, where he met the Rasulid dynasty king (Malik) Mujahid Nur al-Din Ali. Ibn Battuta also mentions visiting Sanaa, but whether he actually did so is doubtful. In all likelihood, he went directly from Taiz to the important trading port of Aden, arriving around the beginning of 1329 or 1331.

==== Somalia ====
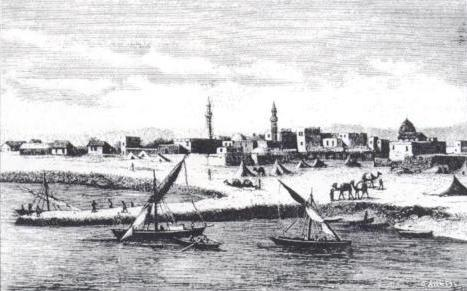
The port and waterfront of Zeila

From Aden, Ibn Battuta embarked on a ship heading for Zeila on the coast of Somalia. He then moved on to Cape Guardafui further down the Somali seaboard, spending about a week in each location. Later he would visit Mogadishu, the then pre-eminent city of the "Land of the Berbers" (بلد البربر Balad al-Barbar, the medieval Arabic term for Somali inhabited areas).

When Ibn Battuta arrived in 1332, Mogadishu stood at the zenith of its prosperity. He described it as "an exceedingly large city" with many rich merchants, noted for its high-quality fabric that was exported to other countries, including Egypt. Battuta added that the city was ruled by a Somali sultan, Abu Bakr ibn Shaikh 'Umar. He noted that Sultan Abu Bakr had dark skin complexion and spoke in his native tongue (Somali), but was also fluent in Arabic. The Sultan also had a retinue of wazirs (ministers), legal experts, commanders, royal eunuchs, and other officials at his beck and call.

==== Swahili coast ====
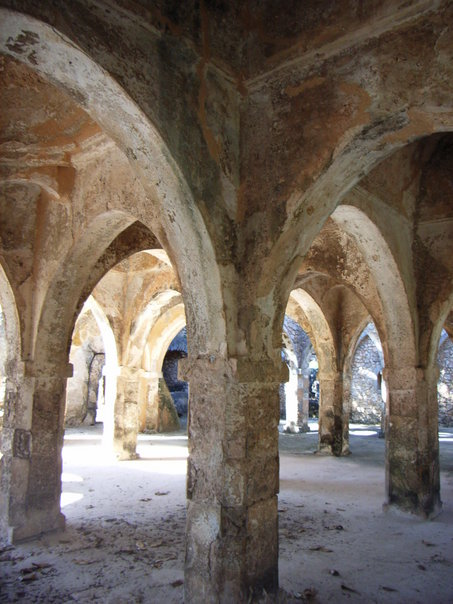
The Great Mosque of Kilwa Kisiwani, made of coral stones, is the largest mosque of its kind.

Ibn Battuta continued by ship south to the Swahili coast, a region then known in Arabic as the Bilad al-Zanj ("Land of the Zanj") with an overnight stop at the island town of Mombasa. Although relatively small at the time, Mombasa would become important in the following century. After a journey along the coast, Ibn Battuta next arrived in the island town of Kilwa in present-day Tanzania, which had become an important transit centre of the gold trade. He described the city as "one of the finest and most beautifully built towns; all the buildings are of wood, and the houses are roofed with dīs reeds".

Ibn Battuta recorded his visit to the Kilwa Sultanate in 1330, and commented favourably on the humility and religion of its ruler, Sultan al-Hasan ibn Sulaiman, a descendant of the legendary Ali ibn al-Hassan Shirazi. He further wrote that the authority of the Sultan extended from Malindi in the north to Inhambane in the south and was particularly impressed by the planning of the city, believing it to be the reason for Kilwa's success along the coast. During this period, he described the construction of the Palace of Husuni Kubwa and a significant extension to the Great Mosque of Kilwa, which was made of coral stones and was the largest mosque of its kind. With a change in the monsoon winds, Ibn Battuta sailed back to Arabia, first to Oman and the Strait of Hormuz then on to Mecca for the hajj of 1330 (or 1332).

=== Itinerary 1332–1347 ===
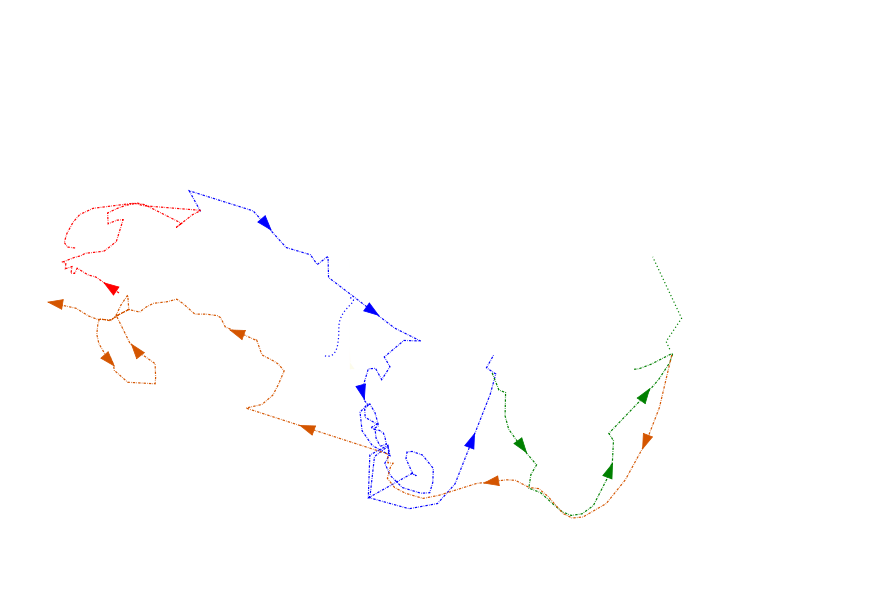
Ibn Battuta Itinerary 1332–1346 (Black Sea Area, Central Asia, India, South East Asia and China)

==== Anatolia ====
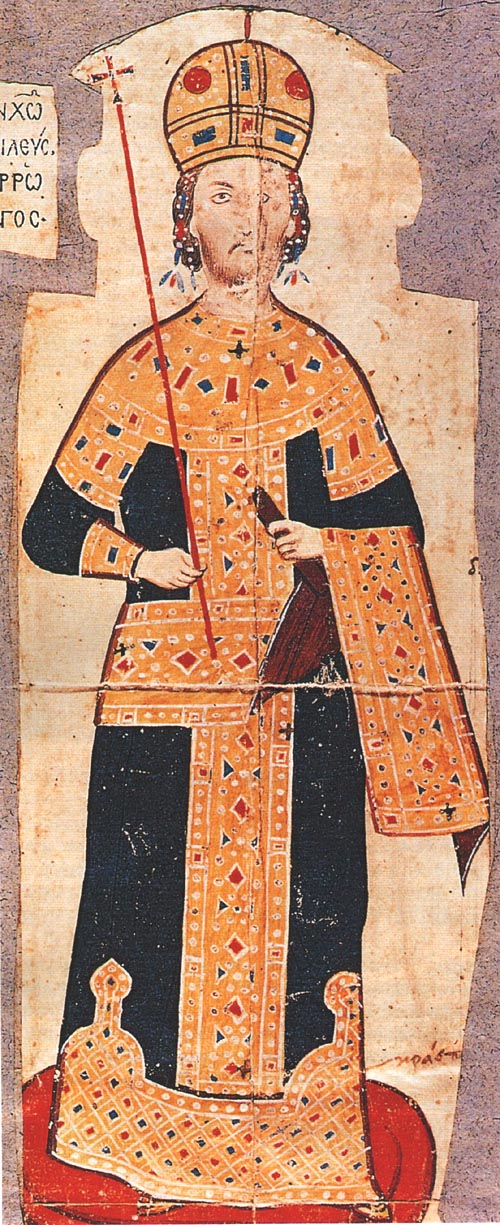
Ibn Battuta may have met Andronikos III Palaiologos in late 1332.

After his third pilgrimage to Mecca, Ibn Battuta decided to seek employment with the Sultan of Delhi, Muhammad bin Tughluq. In the autumn of 1330 (or 1332), he set off for the Seljuk controlled territory of Anatolia to take an overland route to India. He crossed the Red Sea and the Eastern Desert to reach the Nile valley and then headed north to Cairo. From there he crossed the Sinai Peninsula to Palestine and then travelled north again through some of the towns that he had visited in 1326. From the Syrian port of Latakia, a Genoese ship took him (and his companions) to Alanya on the southern coast of modern-day Turkey.

He then journeyed westwards along the coast to the port of Antalya. In the town he met members of one of the semi-religious fityan associations. These were a feature of most Anatolian towns in the 13th and 14th centuries. The members were young artisans and had at their head a leader with the title of Akhil. The associations specialised in welcoming travellers. Ibn Battuta was very impressed with the hospitality that he received and would later stay in their hospices in more than 25 towns in Anatolia. From Antalya Ibn Battuta headed inland to Eğirdir which was the capital of the Hamidids. He spent Ramadan (June 1331 or May 1333) in the city.

From this point his itinerary across Anatolia in the Rihla becomes confused. Ibn Battuta describes travelling westwards from Eğirdir to Milas and then skipping 420 km (260 mi) eastward past Eğirdir to Konya. He then continues travelling in an easterly direction, reaching Erzurum from where he skips 1,160 km (720 mi) back to Birgi which lies north of Milas. Historians believe that Ibn Battuta visited a number of towns in central Anatolia, but not in the order in which he describes. (Note: This is one of several occasions where Ibn Battuta interrupts a journey to branch out on a side trip only to later skip back and resume the original journey. Gibb describes these side trips as "divagations". The divagation through Anatolia is considered credible as Ibn Battuta describes numerous personal experiences and there is sufficient time between leaving Mecca in mid-November 1330 and reaching Eğirdir on the way back from Erzurum at the start of Ramadan (8 June) in 1331. Gibb still admits that he found it difficult to believe that Ibn Battuta actually travelled as far east as Erzurum.)

When Ibn Battuta arrived in İznik, it had just been conquered by Orhan, sultan of the Ottoman Beylik. Orhan was away and his wife was in command of the nearby stationed soldiers, Ibn Battuta gave this account of Orhan's wife: "A pious and excellent woman. She treated me honourably, gave me hospitality and sent gifts."

Ibn Battuta's account of Orhan:

The greatest of the kings of the Turkmens and the richest in wealth, lands and military forces. Of fortresses, he possesses nearly a hundred, and for most of his time, he is continually engaged in making a round of them, staying in each fortress for some days to put it in good order and examine its condition. It is said that he has never stayed for a whole month in any one town. He also fights with the infidels continually and keeps them under siege.

— Ibn Battuta

Ibn Battuta had also visited Bursa which at the time was the capital of the Ottoman Beylik, he described Bursa as "a great and important city with fine bazaars and wide streets, surrounded on all sides with gardens and running springs".

He also visited the Beylik of Aydin. Ibn Battuta stated that the ruler of the Beylik of Aydin had twenty Greek slaves at the entrance of his palace and Ibn Battuta was given a Greek slave as a gift. His visit to Anatolia was the first time in his travels he acquired a servant; the ruler of Aydin gifted him his first slave. Later, he purchased a young Greek girl for 40 dinars in Ephesus, was gifted another slave in İzmir by the Sultan, and purchased a second girl in Balikesir. The conspicuous evidence of his wealth and prestige continued to grow.

==== Central Asia ====
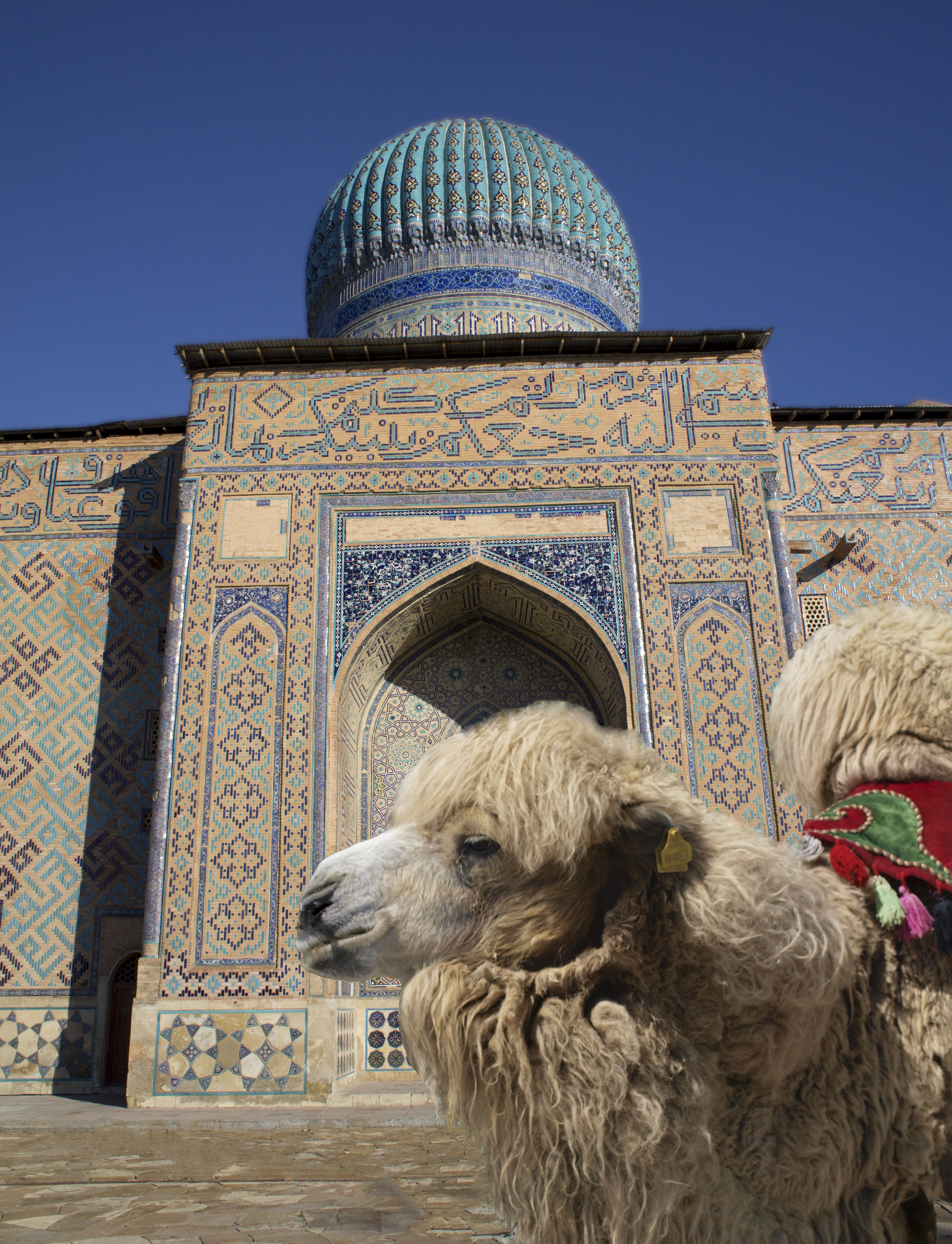
Bactrian camel (one of the symbols of Silk Road caravans) in front of Mausoleum of Khoja Ahmed Yasawi in the city of Turkestan, Kazakhstan

From Sinope, he took a sea route to the Crimean Peninsula, arriving in the Golden Horde realm. He went to the port town of Azov, where he met with the emir of the Khan, then to the large and rich city of Majar. He left Majar to meet with Uzbeg Khan's travelling court (Orda), which was at the time near Mount Beshtau. From there he made a journey to Bolghar, which became the northernmost point he reached, and noted its unusually short nights in summer (by the standards of the subtropics). Then he returned to the Khan's court and with it moved to Astrakhan.

Ibn Battuta recorded that while in Bolghar he wanted to travel further north into the land of darkness. The land is snow-covered throughout (northern Siberia) and the only means of transport is dog-drawn sled. There lived a mysterious people who were reluctant to show themselves. They traded with southern people in a peculiar way. Southern merchants brought various goods and placed them in an open area on the snow in the night, then returned to their tents. Next morning they came to the place again and found their merchandise taken by the mysterious people, but in exchange they found fur-skins which could be used for making valuable coats, jackets, and other winter garments. The trade was done between merchants and the mysterious people without seeing each other. As Ibn Battuta was not a merchant and saw no benefit of going there, he abandoned the travel to this land of darkness.

Flag of the Golden Horde during the reign of Öz Beg Khan

When they reached Astrakhan, Öz Beg Khan had just given permission for one of his pregnant wives, Princess Bayalun, a daughter of Byzantine emperor Andronikos III Palaiologos, to return to her home city of Constantinople to give birth. Ibn Battuta talked his way into this expedition, which would be his first beyond the boundaries of the Islamic world.

Arriving in Constantinople towards the end of 1332 (or 1334), he met the Byzantine emperor Andronikos III Palaiologos. He visited the great church of Hagia Sophia and spoke with an Eastern Orthodox priest about his travels in the city of Jerusalem. After a month in the city, Ibn Battuta returned to Astrakhan, then arrived in the capital city Sarai al-Jadid and reported the accounts of his travels to Sultan Öz Beg Khan (r. 1313–1341). Then he continued past the Caspian and Aral Seas to Bukhara and Samarkand, the latter of which he praised as "one of the grandest and finest cities, and the most perfect of them". Here he visited the court of another Mongol khan, Tarmashirin (r. 1331–1334) of the Chagatai Khanate. He also noted the ruined state of the city walls, a result of the Mongol invasion in 1220 and subsequent infighting. From there, he journeyed south to Afghanistan, then crossed into India via the mountain passes of the Hindu Kush. In the Rihla, he mentions these mountains and the history of the range in slave trading. He wrote,

After this I proceeded to the city of Barwan, in the road to which is a high mountain, covered with snow and exceedingly cold; they call it the Hindu Kush, that is Hindu-slayer, because most of the slaves brought thither from India die on account of the intenseness of the cold.

— Ibn Battuta, Chapter XIII, Rihla – Khorasan

Ibn Battuta and his party reached the Indus River on 12 September 1333. From there, he made his way to Delhi and became acquainted with the sultan, Muhammad bin Tughluq.

==== South Asia ====
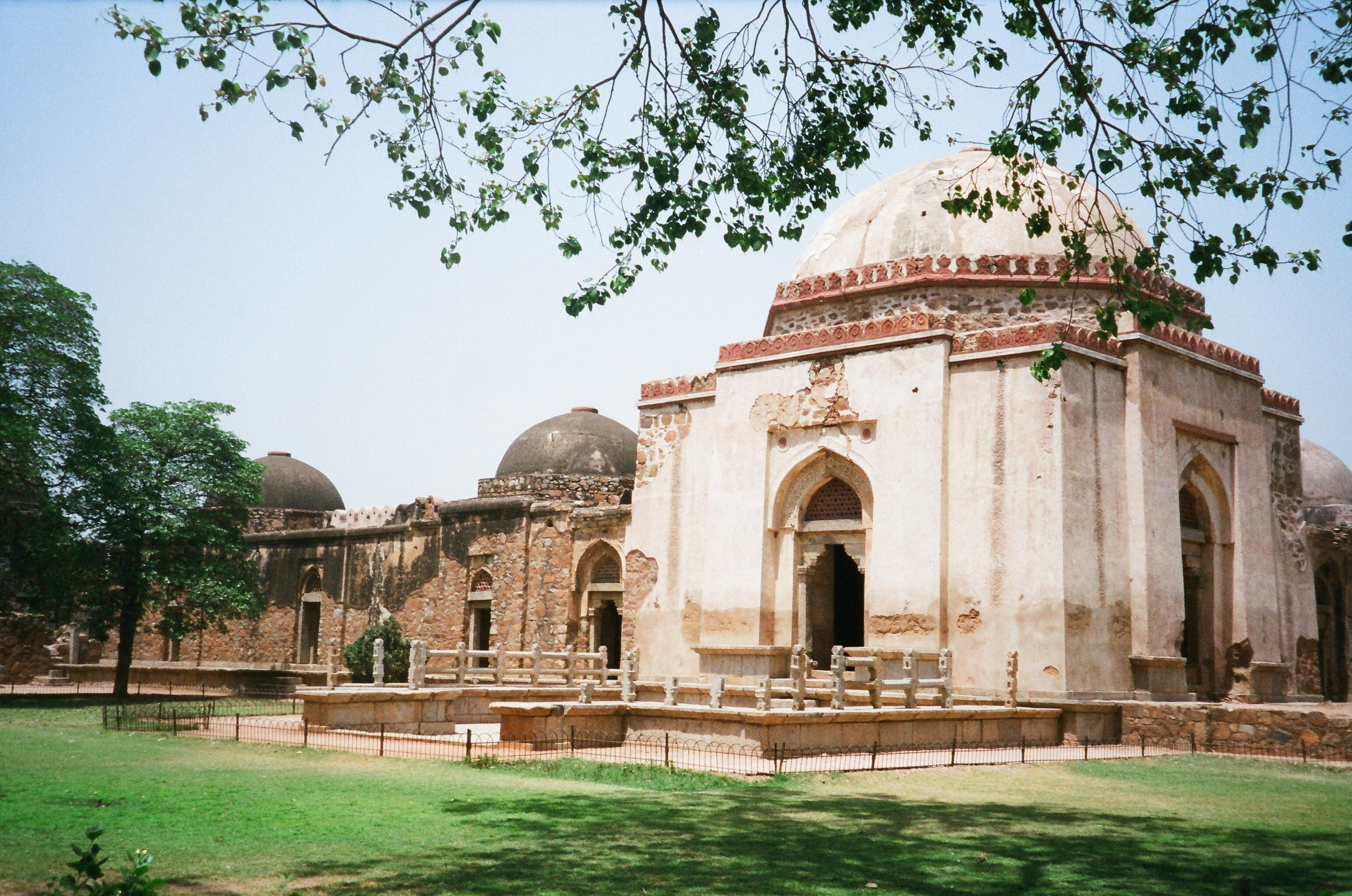
Tomb of Feroze Shah Tughluq, successor of Muhammad bin Tughluq in Delhi. Ibn Battuta served as a qadi or judge for six years during Muhammad bin Tughluq's reign.

Muhammad bin Tughluq was renowned as the wealthiest man in the Muslim world at that time. He patronised various scholars, Sufis, qadis, viziers, and other functionaries in order to consolidate his rule. On the strength of his years of study in Mecca, Ibn Battuta was appointed a qadi (judge) by the sultan. However, he found it difficult to enforce Islamic law beyond the sultan's court in Delhi, due to lack of Islamic appeal in India.

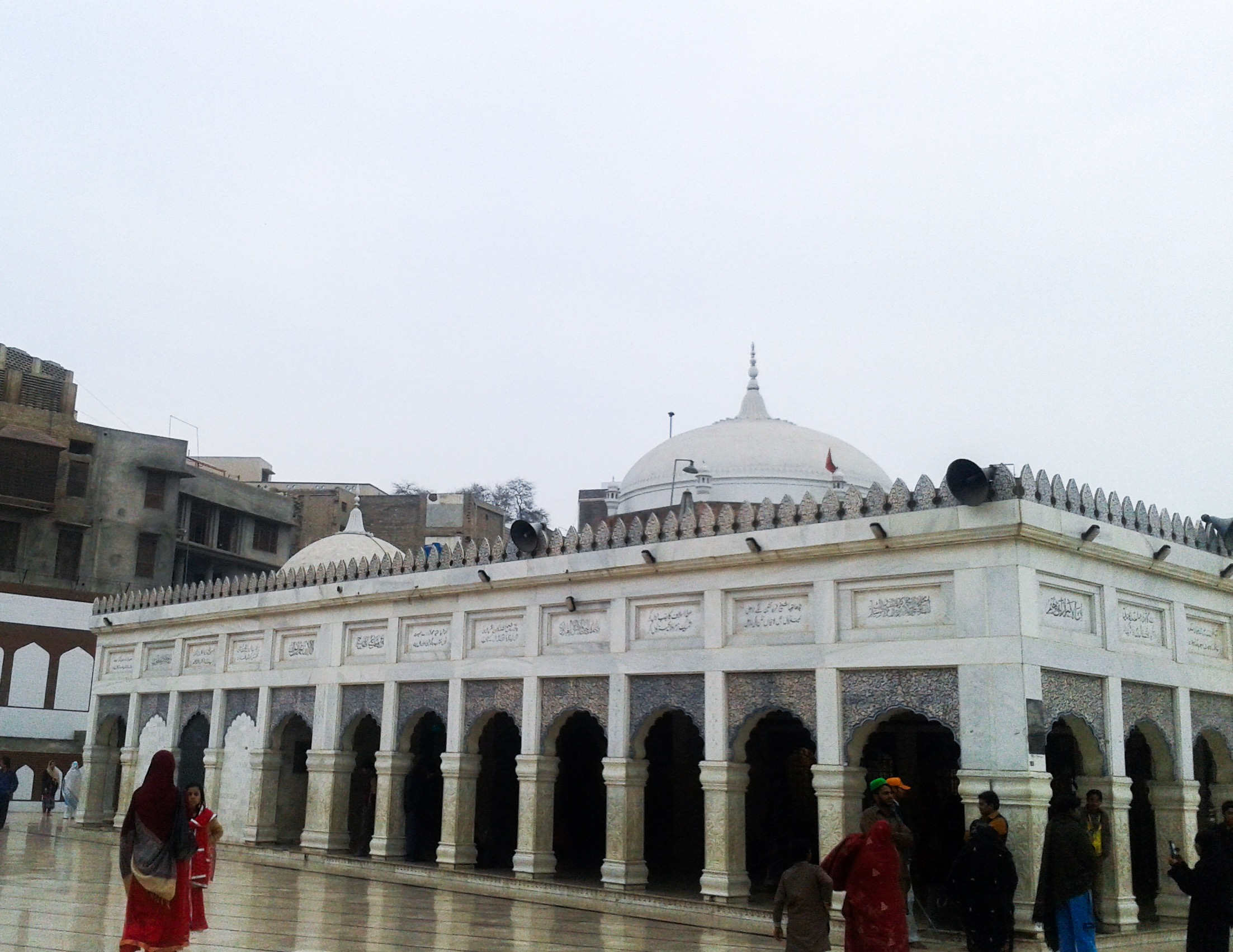
Ibn Battuta in 1334 visited the shrine of Baba Farid in Pakpattan.

It is uncertain by which route Ibn Battuta entered the Indian subcontinent but it is known that he was kidnapped and robbed by rebels on his journey to the Indian coast. He may have entered via the Khyber Pass and Peshawar, or further south. He crossed the Sutlej river near the city of Pakpattan, in modern-day Pakistan, where he paid obeisance at the shrine of Baba Farid, before crossing southwest into Rajput country. From the Rajput kingdom of Sarsatti, Battuta visited Hansi in India, describing it as "among the most beautiful cities, the best constructed and the most populated; it is surrounded with a strong wall, and its founder is said to be one of the great non-Muslim kings, called Tara". Upon his arrival in Sindh, Ibn Battuta mentions the Indian rhinoceros that lived on the banks of the Indus. During his stay in the Delhi Sultanate, Ibn Battuta witnessed a sati ceremony, which was the ritual burning of a widow on her husband's funeral pyre, and recorded a detailed description of the practice in his Rihla.

The Sultan was erratic even by the standards of the time and for six years Ibn Battuta veered between living the high life of a trusted subordinate and falling under suspicion of treason for a variety of offences. His plan to leave on the pretext of taking another hajj was stymied by the Sultan. The opportunity for Battuta to leave Delhi finally arose in 1341 when an embassy arrived from the Yuan dynasty of China asking for permission to rebuild a Himalayan Buddhist temple popular with Chinese pilgrims. (Note: In the Rihla the date of Ibn Battuta's departure from Delhi is given as 17 Safar 743 AH or 22 July 1342. Dunn has argued that this is probably an error and to accommodate Ibn Battuta's subsequent travels and visits to the Maldives it is more likely that he left Delhi in 1341.)

Ibn Battuta was given charge of the embassy but en route to the coast at the start of the journey to China, he and his large retinue were attacked by a group of bandits. Separated from his companions, he was robbed, kidnapped, and nearly lost his life. Despite this setback, within ten days he had caught up with his group and continued on to Khambhat in the Indian state of Gujarat. From there, they sailed to Calicut (now known as Kozhikode), where Portuguese explorer Vasco da Gama would land two centuries later. While in Calicut, Battuta was the guest of the ruling Zamorin. While Ibn Battuta visited a mosque on shore, a storm arose and one of the ships of his expedition sank. The other ship then sailed without him only to be seized by a local Sumatran king a few months later.

Afraid to return to Delhi and be seen as a failure, he stayed for a time in southern India under the protection of Jamal-ud-Din, ruler of the small but powerful Nawayath Sultanate on the banks of the Sharavathi river next to the Arabian Sea. This area is today known as Hosapattana and lies in the Honnavar Taluk of South Konkan. Following the overthrow of the sultanate, Ibn Battuta had no choice but to leave India. Although determined to continue his journey to China, he first took a detour to visit the Maldive Islands where he worked as a judge.

He spent nine months on the islands, much longer than he had intended. When he arrived at the capital, Malé, Ibn Battuta did not plan to stay. However, the leaders of the formerly Buddhist nation that had recently converted to Islam were looking for a chief judge, someone who knew Arabic and the Qur'an. To convince him to stay they gave him pearls, gold jewellery, and slaves, while at the same time making it impossible for him to leave by ship. Compelled into staying, he became a chief judge and married into the royal family of Omar I.

Ibn Battuta took on his duties as a judge with keenness and strived to transform local practices to conform to a stricter application of Muslim law. He commanded that men who did not attend Friday prayer be publicly whipped, and that robbers' right hand be cut off. He forbade women from being topless in public, which had previously been the custom. However, these and other strict judgements began to antagonise the island nation's rulers, and involved him in power struggles and political intrigues. Ibn Battuta resigned from his job as chief qadi, although in all likelihood it was inevitable that he would have been dismissed.

Throughout his travels, Ibn Battuta kept close company with women, usually taking a wife whenever he stopped for any length of time at one place, and then divorcing her when he moved on. While in the Maldives, Ibn Battuta took four wives. In his Travels he wrote that in the Maldives the effect of small dowries and female non-mobility combined to, in effect, make a marriage a convenient temporary arrangement for visiting male travellers and sailors.

From the Maldives, he carried on to Sri Lanka and visited Sri Pada and Tenavaram temple. Ibn Battuta's ship almost sank on embarking from Sri Lanka, only for the vessel that came to his rescue to suffer an attack by pirates. Stranded onshore, he worked his way back to the Madurai kingdom in India. Here he spent some time in the court of the short-lived Madurai Sultanate under Ghiyas-ud-Din Muhammad Damghani, from where he returned to the Maldives and boarded a Chinese junk, still intending to reach China and take up his ambassadorial post.

He reached the port of Chittagong in modern-day Bangladesh intending to travel to Sylhet to meet Shah Jalal, who became so renowned that Ibn Battuta, then in Chittagong, made a one-month journey through the mountains of Kamaru near Sylhet to meet him. On his way to Sylhet, Ibn Battuta was greeted by several of Shah Jalal's disciples who had come to assist him on his journey many days before he had arrived. At the meeting in 1345 CE, Ibn Battuta noted that Shah Jalal was tall and lean, fair in complexion and lived by the mosque in a cave, where his only item of value was a goat he kept for milk, butter, and yogurt. He observed that the companions of the Shah Jalal were foreign and known for their strength and bravery. He also mentions that many people would visit the Shah to seek guidance. Ibn Battuta went further north into Assam, then turned around and continued with his original plan.

==== Southeast Asia ====
In 1345, Ibn Battuta travelled to Samudra Pasai Sultanate (called "al-Jawa") in present-day Aceh, Northern Sumatra, after 40 days voyage from Sunur Kawan. He notes in his travel log that the ruler of Samudra Pasai was a pious Muslim named Sultan Al-Malik Al-Zahir Jamal-ad-Din, who performed his religious duties with utmost zeal and often waged campaigns against animists in the region. The island of Sumatra, according to Ibn Battuta, was rich in camphor, areca nut, cloves, and tin.

The madh'hab he observed was Imam Al-Shafi‘i, whose customs were similar to those he had previously seen in coastal India, especially among the Mappila Muslims, who were also followers of Imam Al-Shafi‘i. At that time Samudra Pasai marked the end of Dar al-Islam, because no territory east of this was ruled by a Muslim. Here he stayed for about two weeks in the wooden walled town as a guest of the sultan, and then the sultan provided him with supplies and sent him on his way on one of his own junks to China.

Ibn Battuta first sailed for 21 days to a place called "Mul Jawa" (island of Java or Majapahit Java) which was a centre of a Hindu empire. The empire spanned 2 months of travel, and ruled over the country of Qaqula and Qamara. He arrived at the walled city named Qaqula/Kakula, and observed that the city had war junks for pirate raiding and collecting tolls and that elephants were employed for various purposes. He met the ruler of Mul Jawa and stayed as a guest for three days.

Ibn Battuta then sailed to a state called Kaylukari in the land of Tawalisi, where he met Urduja, a local princess. Urduja was a brave warrior, and her people were opponents of the Yuan dynasty. She was described as an "idolater", but could write the phrase Bismillah in Islamic calligraphy. The locations of Kaylukari and Tawalisi are disputed. Kaylukari might referred to Po Klong Garai in Champa (now southern Vietnam), and Urduja might be an aristocrat of Champa or Dai Viet. Filipinos widely believe that Kaylukari was in present-day Pangasinan Province of the Philippines. Their opposition to the Mongols might indicate 2 possible locations: Japan and Java (Majapahit). In modern times, Urduja has been featured in Filipino textbooks and films as a national heroine. Numerous other locations have been proposed, ranging from Java to somewhere in Guangdong Province, China. However, Sir Henry Yule and William Henry Scott consider both Tawalisi and Urduja to be entirely fictitious. From Kaylukari, Ibn Battuta finally reached Quanzhou in Fujian Province, China.

==== China ====
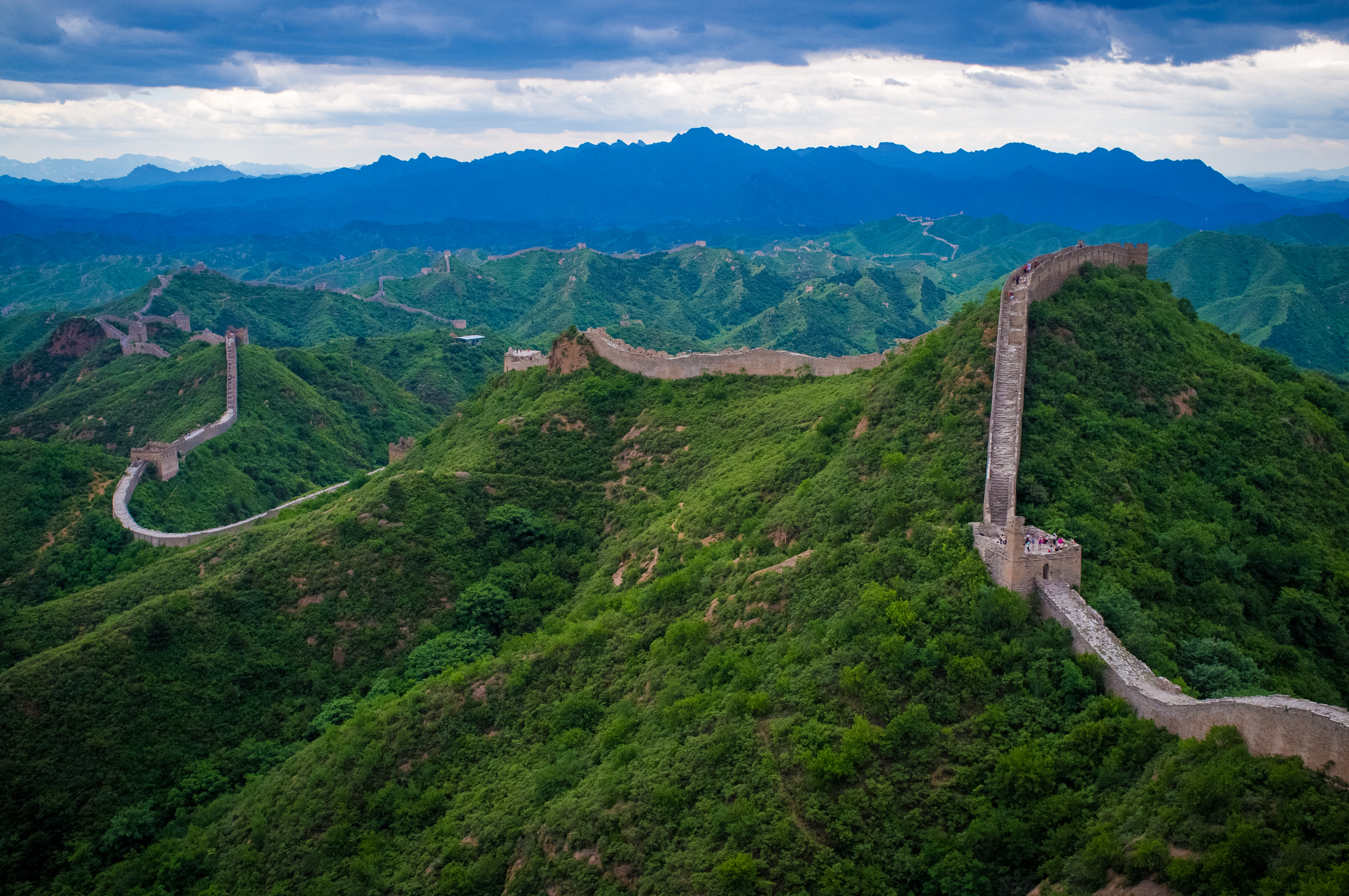
Ibn Battuta provides the earliest mention of the Great Wall of China with regard to medieval geographic studies, although he did not see it.

In the year 1345, Ibn Battuta arrived at Quanzhou in China's Fujian province, then under the rule of the Mongol-led Yuan dynasty. One of the first things he noted was that Muslims referred to the city as "Zaitun" (meaning olive), but Ibn Battuta could not find any olives anywhere. He mentioned local artists and their mastery in making portraits of newly arrived foreigners; these were for security purposes. Ibn Battuta praised the craftsmen and their silk and porcelain, as well as fruits such as plums and watermelons and the advantages of paper money.

He described the manufacturing process of large ships in the city of Quanzhou. He also mentioned Chinese cuisine and its use of animals such as frogs, pigs, and even dogs, which were sold in the markets, and noted that the chickens in China were larger than those in the west. Scholars however have pointed out numerous errors given in Ibn Battuta's account of China, for example confusing the Yellow River with the Grand Canal and other waterways, as well as believing that porcelain was made from coal.

In Quanzhou, Ibn Battuta was welcomed by the head of the local Muslim merchants (possibly a fānzhǎng or "Leader of Foreigners" simplified Chinese: 番长; traditional Chinese: 番長; pinyin: fānzhǎng) and Sheikh al-Islam (Imam), who came to meet him with flags, drums, trumpets, and musicians. Ibn Battuta noted that the Muslim populace lived within a separate portion in the city where they had their own mosques, bazaars, and hospitals. In Quanzhou, he met two prominent Iranians, Burhan al-Din of Kazerun and Sharif al-Din from Tabriz (both of whom were influential figures noted in the Yuan History as "A-mi-li-ding" and "Sai-fu-ding", respectively). While in Quanzhou he ascended the "Mount of the Hermit" and briefly visited a well-known Taoist monk in a cave.

He then travelled south along the Chinese coast to Guangzhou, where he lodged for two weeks with one of the city's wealthy merchants.

From Guangzhou he went north to Quanzhou and then proceeded to the city of Fuzhou, where he took up residence with Zahir al-Din and met Kawam al-Din and a fellow countryman named Al-Bushri of Ceuta, who had become a wealthy merchant in China. Al-Bushri accompanied Ibn Battuta northwards to Hangzhou and paid for the gifts that Ibn Battuta would present to the Emperor Huizong of Yuan.

Ibn Battuta said that Hangzhou was one of the largest cities he had ever seen, and he noted its charm, describing that the city sat on a beautiful lake surrounded by gentle green hills. He mentions the city's Muslim quarter and resided as a guest with a family of Egyptian origin. During his stay at Hangzhou he was particularly impressed by the large number of well-crafted and well-painted Chinese wooden ships, with coloured sails and silk awnings, assembling in the canals. Later he attended a banquet of the Yuan administrator of the city named Qurtai, who according to Ibn Battuta, was very fond of the skills of local Chinese conjurers. Ibn Battuta also mentions locals who worshipped a solar deity.

He described floating through the Grand Canal on a boat watching crop fields, orchids, merchants in black silk, and women in flowered silk and priests also in silk. In Beijing, Ibn Battuta referred to himself as the long-lost ambassador from the Delhi Sultanate and was invited to the Yuan imperial court of Emperor Huizong (who according to Ibn Battuta was worshipped by some people in China). Ibn Batutta noted that the palace of Khanbaliq was made of wood and that the ruler's "head wife" (Empress Qi) held processions in her honour.

Ibn Battuta also wrote he had heard of "the rampart of Yajuj and Majuj" that was "sixty days' travel" from the city of Zeitun (Quanzhou); Hamilton Alexander Rosskeen Gibb notes that Ibn Battuta believed that the Great Wall of China was built by Dhul-Qarnayn to contain Gog and Magog as mentioned in the Quran. However, Ibn Battuta, who asked about the wall in China, could find no one who had either seen it or knew of anyone who had seen it.

Ibn Battuta travelled from Beijing to Hangzhou, and then proceeded to Fuzhou. Upon his return to Quanzhou, he soon boarded a Chinese junk owned by the Sultan of Samudera Pasai Sultanate heading for Southeast Asia, whereupon Ibn Battuta was unfairly charged a hefty sum by the crew and lost much of what he had collected during his stay in China.

Battuta claimed that the Emperor Huizong of Yuan had interred with him in his grave six slave soldiers and four girl slaves. Silver, gold, weapons, and carpets were put into the grave.

== Return ==
After returning to Quanzhou in 1346, Ibn Battuta began his journey back to Morocco. In Kozhikode, he once again considered throwing himself at the mercy of Muhammad bin Tughluq in Delhi, but thought better of it and decided to carry on to Mecca. On his way to Basra he passed through the Strait of Hormuz, where he learned that Abu Sa'id, last ruler of the Ilkhanate dynasty, had died in Iran. Abu Sa'id's territories had subsequently collapsed due to a fierce civil war between the Iranians and Mongols.

In 1348, Ibn Battuta arrived in Damascus with the intention of retracing the route of his first hajj. He then learned that his father had died 15 years earlier, and death became the dominant theme for the next year or so. The Black Death had struck, and he stopped in Homs as the plague spread through Syria, Palestine, and Arabia. He heard of terrible death tolls in Gaza but returned to Damascus that July, where the death toll had reached 2,400 victims each day. When he stopped in Gaza, he found it was depopulated, and in Egypt he stayed at Abu Sir. Reportedly deaths in Cairo had reached levels of 1,100 each day. He made hajj to Mecca, then he decided to return to Morocco, nearly a quarter of a century after leaving home. On the way he made one last detour to Sardinia, then, in 1349, returned to Tangier by way of Fez, only to discover that his mother had also died a few months before.

=== Itinerary 1349–1354 ===
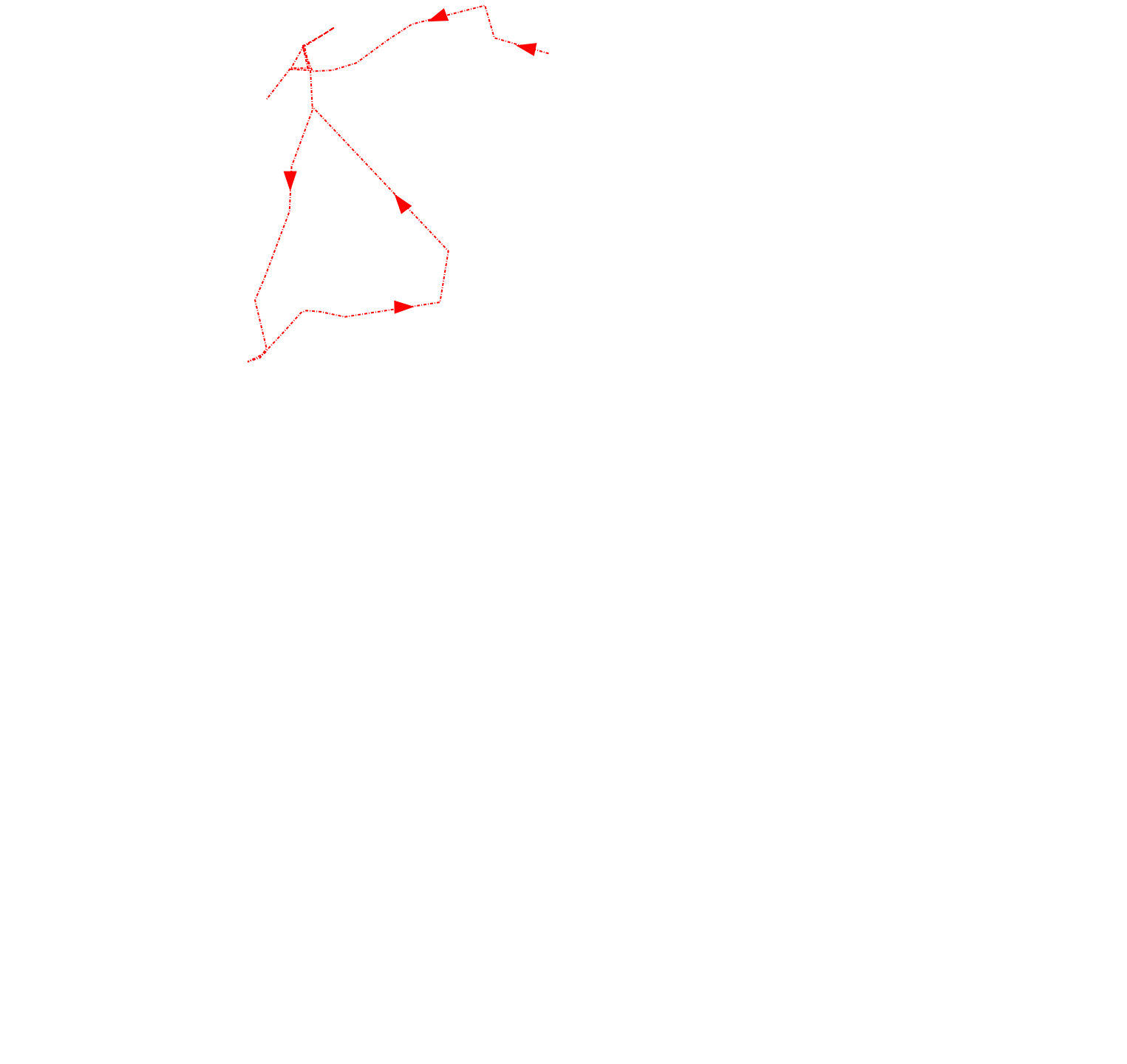
Ibn Battuta Itinerary 1349–1354 (North Africa, Spain and West Africa)

==== Spain and North Africa ====
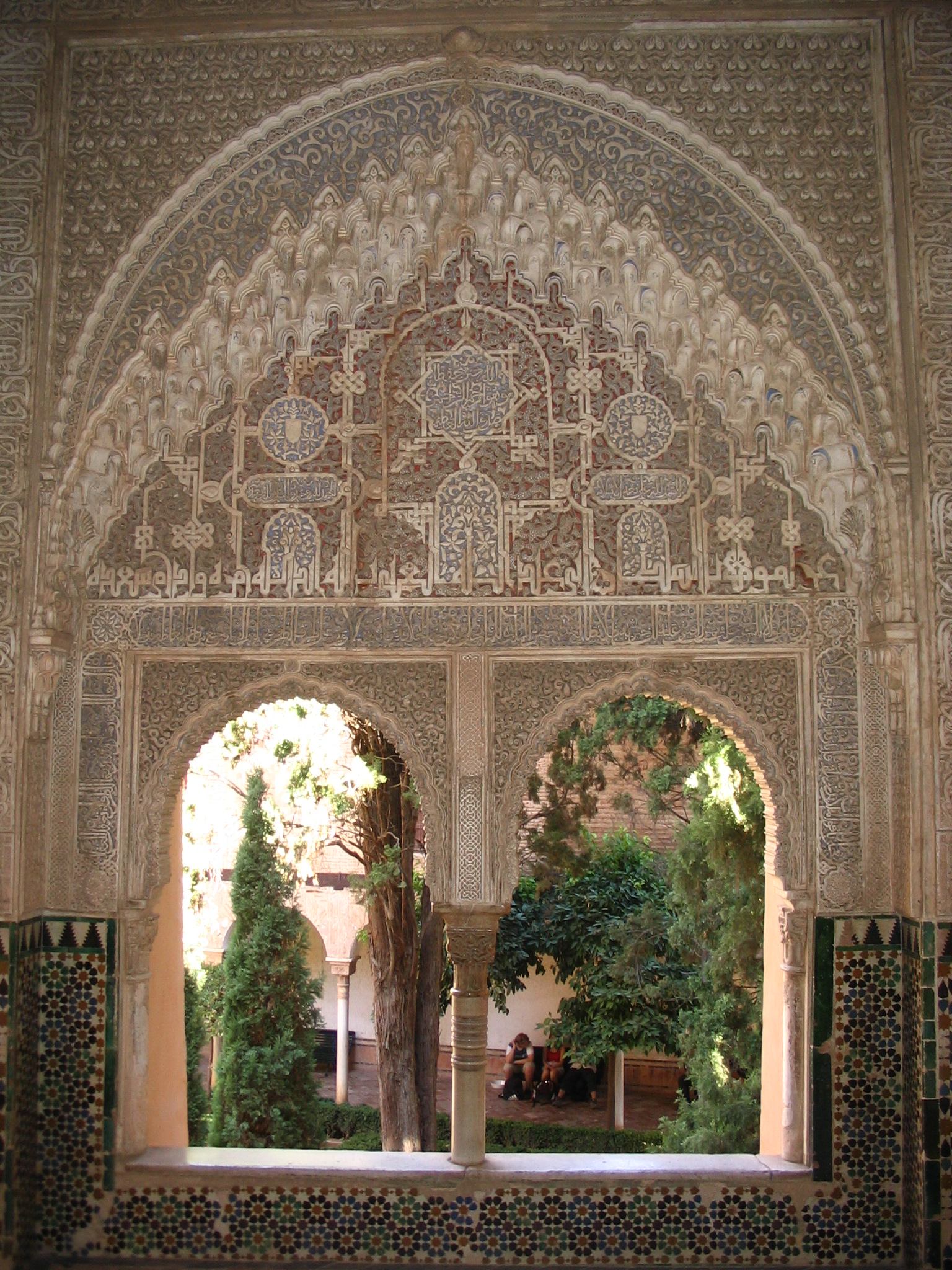
Ibn Battuta visited the Emirate of Granada, which was the final vestige of the Arab populace in Al-Andalus.

After a few days in Tangier, Ibn Battuta set out for a trip to the Muslim-controlled territory of al-Andalus on the Iberian Peninsula. King Alfonso XI of Castile and León had threatened to attack Gibraltar, so in 1350, Ibn Battuta joined a group of Muslims leaving Tangier with the intention of defending the port. By the time he arrived, the Black Death had killed Alfonso and the threat of invasion had receded, so he turned the trip into a sight-seeing tour ending up in Granada.

After his departure from al-Andalus he decided to travel through Morocco. On his return home, he stopped for a while in Marrakesh, which was almost a ghost town following the recent plague and the transfer of the capital to Fez.

==== Mali and Timbuktu ====
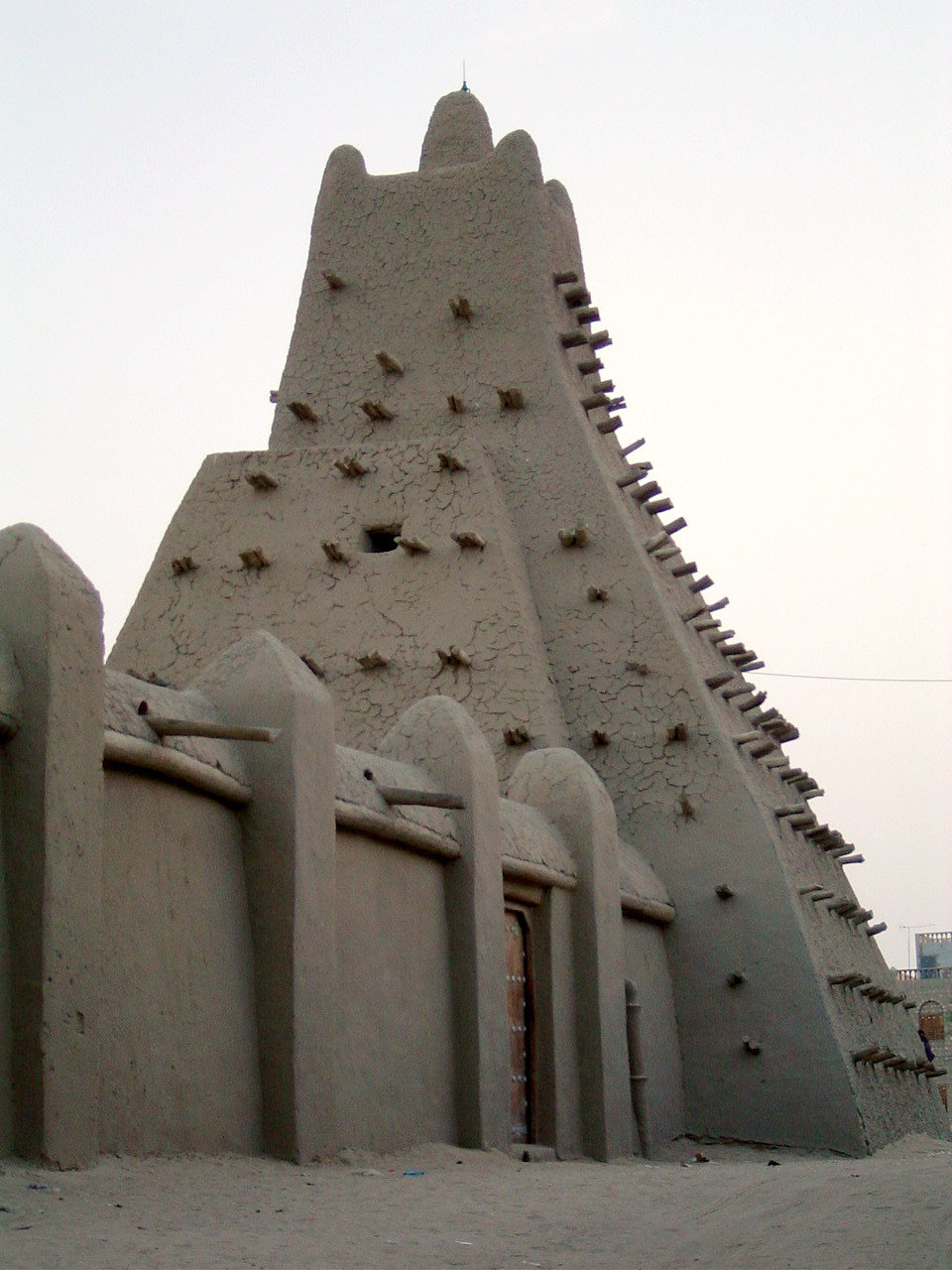
Sankore Madrasah in Timbuktu, Mali

In the autumn of 1351, Ibn Battuta left Fez and made his way to the town of Sijilmasa on the northern edge of the Sahara in present-day Morocco. There he bought a number of camels and stayed for four months. He set out again with a caravan in February 1352 and, after 25 days, arrived at the dry salt lake bed of Taghaza with its salt mines. All of the local buildings were made from slabs of salt by the slaves of the Masufa tribe, who cut the salt in thick slabs for transport by camel. Taghaza was a commercial centre and awash with Malian gold, though Ibn Battuta did not form a favourable impression of the place, recording that it was plagued by flies and the water was brackish.

After a ten-day stay in Taghaza, the caravan set out for the oasis of Tasarahla (probably Bir al-Ksaib), (Note: Bir al-Ksaib (also Bir Ounane or El Gçaib) is in northern Mali at 21°17′33″N 5°37′30″W. The oasis is 265 km (165 mi) south of Taghaza and 470 km (290 mi) north of Oualata.) where it stopped for three days in preparation for the last and most difficult leg of the journey across the vast desert. From Tasarahla, a Masufa scout was sent ahead to the oasis town of Oualata, where he arranged for water to be transported a distance of four days travel where it would meet the thirsty caravan. Oualata was the southern terminus of the trans-Saharan trade route and had recently become part of the Mali Empire. Altogether, the caravan took two months to cross the 1,600 km (990 mi) of desert from Sijilmasa.

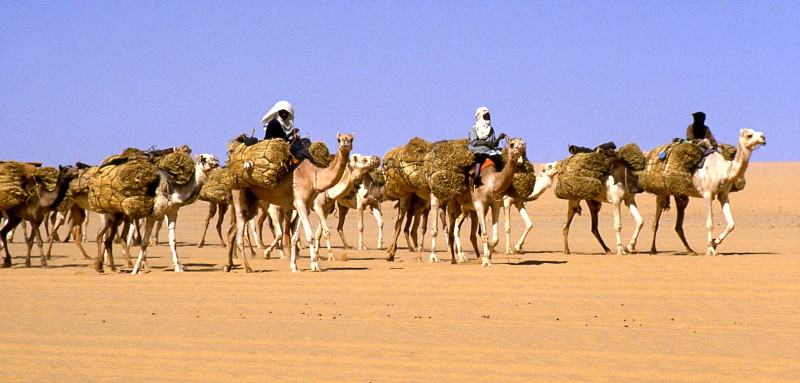
Azalai salt caravan from Agadez to Bilma, Niger

From there, Ibn Battuta travelled southwest along a river he believed to be the Nile (it was actually the Niger River), until he reached the capital of the Mali Empire. (Note: The location of the Malian capital has been the subject of considerable scholarly debate, but there is no consensus. The historian John Hunwick has studied the times given by Ibn Battuta for the various stages of his journey and proposed that the capital is likely to have been on the left side of the Niger River somewhere between Bamako and Nyamina.) There he met Mansa Suleyman, king since 1341. Ibn Battuta disapproved of the fact that female slaves, servants, and even the daughters of the sultan went about exposing parts of their bodies not befitting a Muslim. He wrote in his Rihla that black Africans were characterised by "ill manners" and "contempt for white men", and that he "was long astonished at their feeble intellect and their respect for mean things." The earliest mention of the Mande xylophone (now known as bala) comes from this journey: "made from reeds and gourds, which are struck with sticks and make a pleasant sound". He left the capital in February accompanied by a local Malian merchant and journeyed overland by camel to Timbuktu. Though in the next two centuries it would become the most important city in the region, at that time it was a small city and relatively unimportant. It was during this journey that Ibn Battuta first encountered a hippopotamus. The animals were feared by the local boatmen and hunted with lances to which strong cords were attached. After a short stay in Timbuktu, Ibn Battuta journeyed down the Niger to Gao in a canoe carved from a single tree. At the time Gao was an important commercial centre.

After spending a month in Gao, Ibn Battuta set off with a large caravan for the oasis of Takedda. On his journey across the desert, he received a message from the Sultan of Morocco commanding him to return home. He set off for Sijilmasa in September 1353, accompanying a large caravan transporting 600 female slaves, and arrived back in Morocco early in 1354.

Ibn Battuta's itinerary gives scholars a glimpse as to when Islam first began to spread into the heart of West Africa.

== Works ==
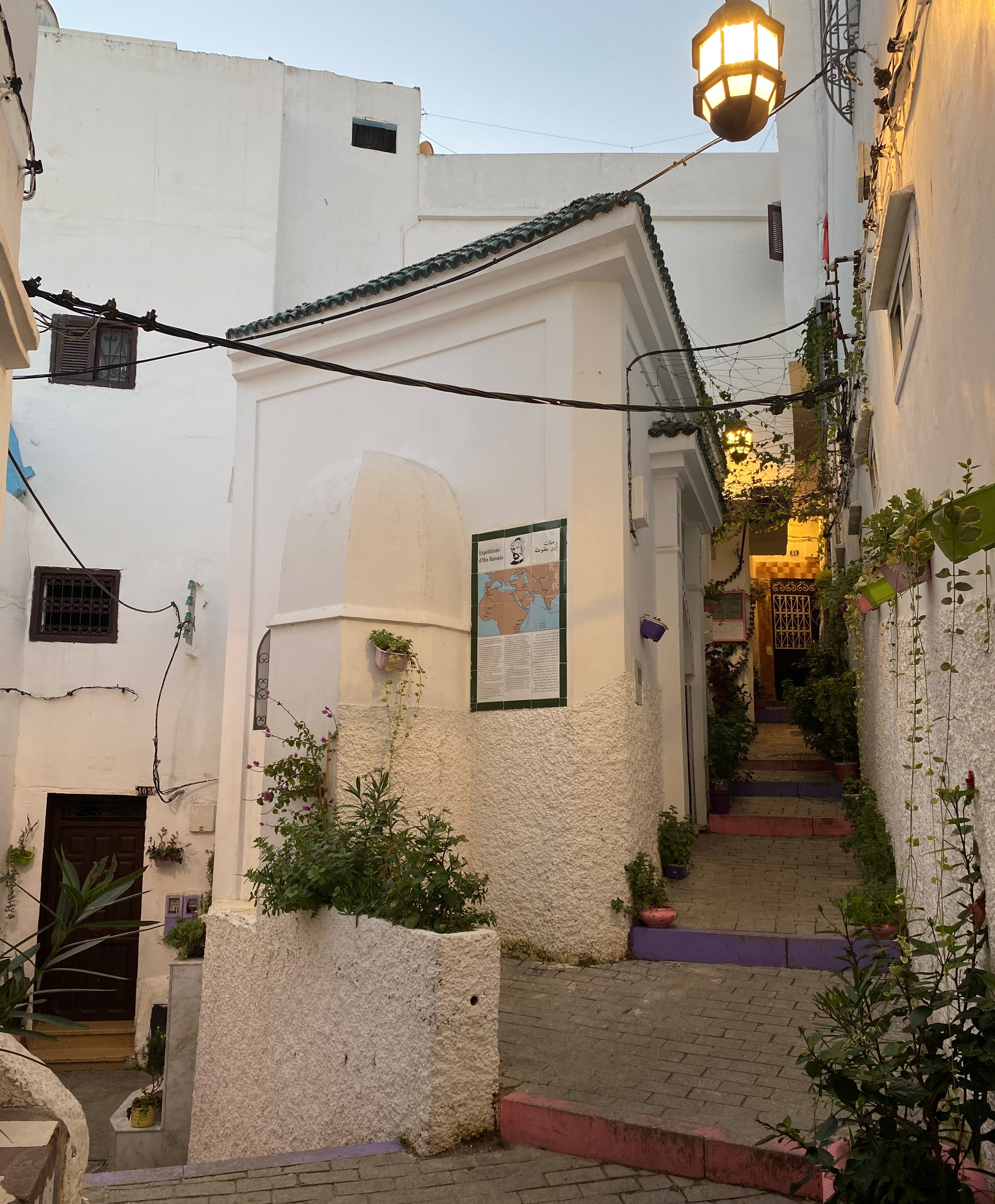
Purported Mausoleum of Ibn Battuta in Tangier

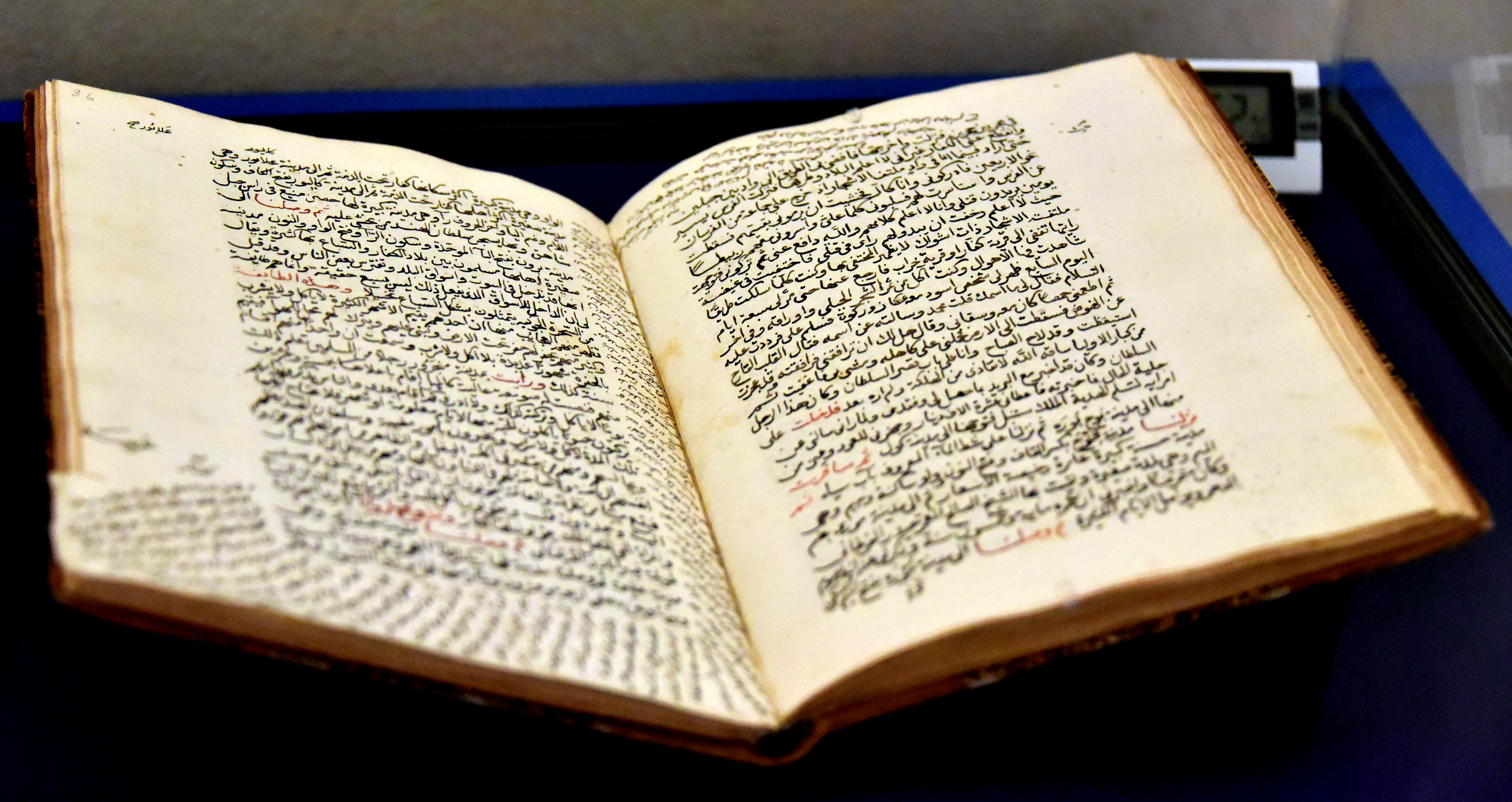
Historic copy of selected parts of the Travel Report by Ibn Battuta, 1836 CE, Cairo

After returning home from his travels in 1354, and at the suggestion of the Marinid ruler of Morocco, Abu Inan Faris, Ibn Battuta dictated an account in Arabic of his journeys to Ibn Juzayy, a scholar whom he had previously met in Granada. The account is the only source for Ibn Battuta's adventures. The full title of the manuscript may be translated as A Masterpiece to Those Who Contemplate the Wonders of Cities and the Marvels of Travelling (تحفة النظار في غرائب الأمصار وعجائب الأسفار, Tuḥfat an-Nuẓẓār fī Gharāʾib al-Amṣār wa ʿAjāʾib al-Asfār). (Note: Dunn gives the clunkier translation A Gift to the Observers Concerning the Curiosities of the Cities and the Marvels Encountered in Travels.) However, it is often simply referred to as The Travels (الرحلة, Rihla), in reference to a standard form of Arabic literature.

There is no indication that Ibn Battuta made any notes or had any journal during his twenty-nine years of travelling. (Note: Though he mentions being robbed of some notes) When he came to dictate an account of his experiences, he had to rely on memory and manuscripts produced by earlier travellers. Ibn Juzayy did not acknowledge his sources and presented some of the earlier descriptions as Ibn Battuta's own observations. When describing Damascus, Mecca, Medina, and some other places in the Middle East, he clearly copied passages from the account by the Andalusian Ibn Jubayr which had been written more than 150 years earlier. Similarly, most of Ibn Juzayy's descriptions of places in Palestine were copied from an account by the 13th-century traveller Muhammad al-Abdari.

Modern scholars do not believe that Ibn Battuta visited all the places he described and argue that in order to provide a comprehensive description of places in the Muslim world, he relied on hearsay evidence and made use of accounts by earlier travellers. For example, it is considered very unlikely that Ibn Battuta made a trip up the Volga River from New Sarai to visit Bolghar and there are serious doubts about a number of other journeys such as his trip to Sanaa in Yemen, his journey from Balkh to Bistam in Khorasan, and his trip around Anatolia.

Ibn Battuta's claim that a Maghrebian called "Abu'l Barakat the Berber" converted the Maldives to Islam is contradicted by an entirely different story; according to the Tarikh, the official history of the Maldives, the Maldives were converted to Islam after miracles were performed by a Tabrizi named Maulana Shaikh Yusuf Shams-ud-din.

Some scholars have also questioned whether he actually visited China. Ibn Battuta may have plagiarised entire sections of his descriptions of China lifted from works by other authors like "Masalik al-absar fi mamalik al-amsar" by Shihab al-Umari, Sulaiman al-Tajir, and possibly from Al Juwayni, Rashid al din, and an Alexander romance. Furthermore, Ibn Battuta's description and Marco Polo's writings share extremely similar sections and themes, with some of the same commentary. For example, it is unlikely that the third Caliph Uthman ibn Affan met someone in China with an identical name who was also described by Ibn Battuta.

However, even if the Rihla is not fully based on what its author personally witnessed, it provides an important account of much of the 14th-century world. Concubines were used by Ibn Battuta such as in Delhi. He wedded several women, divorced at least some of them, and in Damascus, Malabar, Delhi, Bukhara, and the Maldives had children by them or by concubines. Ibn Battuta insulted Greeks as "enemies of Allah", drunkards and "swine eaters", while at the same time in Ephesus he purchased and used a Greek girl who was one of his many slave girls in his "harem" through Byzantium, Khorasan, Africa, and Palestine. It was two decades before he again returned to find out what happened to one of his wives and child in Damascus.

Ibn Battuta often experienced culture shock in regions he visited where the local customs of recently converted peoples did not fit in with his orthodox Muslim background. Among the Turks and Mongols, he remarked that on seeing a Turkic couple in a bazaar one might assume that the man was the woman's servant when he was in fact her husband. He also felt that dress customs in the Maldives and some sub-Saharan regions in Africa were too revealing.

Little is known about Ibn Battuta's life after the completion of his Rihla in 1355. He was appointed a judge in Morocco and died in 1368 or 1369.

Ibn Battuta's work was unknown outside the Muslim world until the beginning of the 19th century, when the German traveller-explorer Ulrich Jasper Seetzen (1767–1811) acquired a collection of manuscripts in the Middle East, among which was a 94-page volume containing an abridged version of Ibn Juzayy's text. Three extracts were published in 1818 by the German Orientalist Johann Kosegarten. A fourth extract was published the following year. French scholars were alerted to the initial publication by a lengthy review published in the Journal de Savants by the Orientalist Silvestre de Sacy.

Three copies of another abridged manuscript were acquired by the Swiss traveller Johann Burckhardt and bequeathed to the University of Cambridge. He gave a brief overview of their content in a book published posthumously in 1819. The Arabic text was translated into English by the Orientalist Samuel Lee and published in London in 1829.

In the 1830s, during the French occupation of Algeria, the Bibliothèque Nationale (BNF) in Paris acquired five manuscripts of Ibn Battuta's travels, two of which were complete. (Note: Neither de Slane's 19th century catalogue nor the modern online equivalent provide any information on the provenance of the manuscripts. Dunn states that all five manuscripts were "found in Algeria" but in their introduction Defrémery and Sanguinetti mention that the BNF had acquired one manuscript (MS Supplément arabe 909/Arabe 2287) from M. Delaporte, a former French consul to Morocco.) One manuscript containing just the second part of the work is dated 1356 and is believed to be Ibn Juzayy's autograph. The BNF manuscripts were used in 1843 by the Irish-French orientalist Baron de Slane to produce a translation into French of Ibn Battuta's visit to the Sudan. They were also studied by the French scholars Charles Defrémery and Beniamino Sanguinetti. Beginning in 1853 they published a series of four volumes containing a critical edition of the Arabic text together with a translation into French. In their introduction Defrémery and Sanguinetti praised Lee's annotations but were critical of his translation which they claimed lacked precision, even in straightforward passages. (Note: French: "La version de M. Lee manque quelquefois d'exactitude, même dans des passage fort simples et très-faciles".)

In 1929, exactly a century after the publication of Lee's translation, the historian and orientalist Hamilton Gibb published an English translation of selected portions of Defrémery and Sanguinetti's Arabic text. Gibb had proposed to the Hakluyt Society in 1922 that he should prepare an annotated translation of the entire Rihla into English. His intention was to divide the translated text into four volumes, each volume corresponding to one of the volumes published by Defrémery and Sanguinetti. The first volume was not published until 1958. Gibb died in 1971, having completed the first three volumes. The fourth volume was prepared by Charles Beckingham and published in 1994. Defrémery and Sanguinetti's printed text has now been translated into number of other languages.

== Historicity ==
German Islamic studies scholar Ralph Elger views Battuta's travel account as an important literary work but doubts the historicity of much of its content, which he suspects to be a work of fiction compiled and inspired from other contemporary travel reports. Various other scholars have raised similar doubts.

In 1987, Ross E. Dunn similarly expressed doubts that any evidence would be found to support the narrative of the Rihla, but in 2010, Tim Mackintosh-Smith completed a multi-volume field study in dozens of the locales mentioned in the Rihla, in which he reports on previously unknown manuscripts of Islamic law kept in the archives of Al-Azhar University in Cairo that were copied by Ibn Battuta in Damascus in 1326, corroborating the date in the Rihla of his sojourn in Syria.

== In popular culture ==
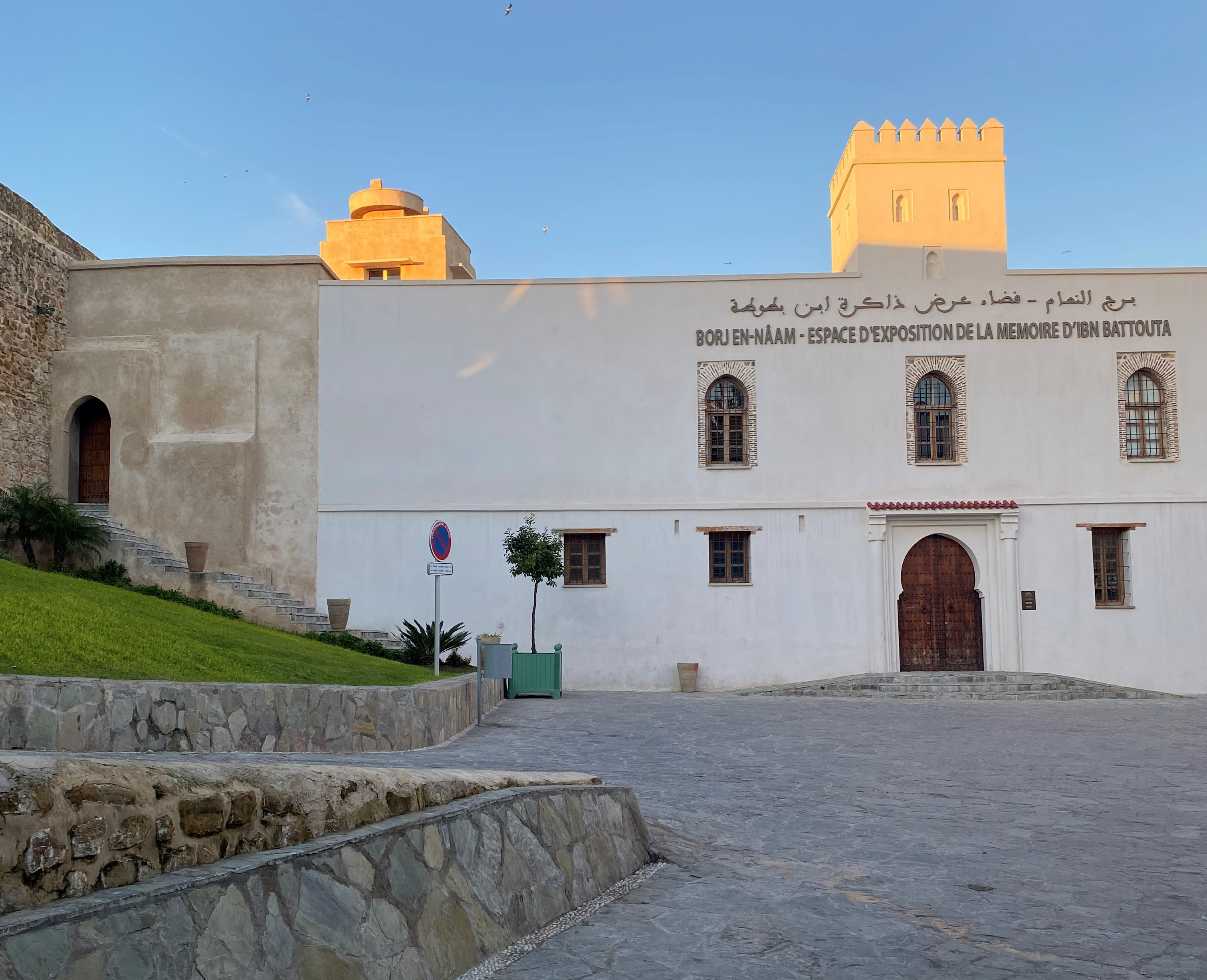
Borj en-Nâam barracks in Tangier, repurposed as Ibn Battuta Memorial Museum

The largest themed mall in Dubai, United Arab Emirates, the Ibn Battuta Mall is named for him and features both areas designed to recreate the exotic lands he visited on his travels and statuary tableaus depicting scenes from his life history.

A giant semblance of Battuta, alongside two others from the history of Arab exploration, the geographer and historian Al-Bakri and the navigator and cartographer Ibn Majid, is displayed at the Mobility pavilion at Expo 2020 in Dubai in a section of the exhibition designed by Wētā Workshop.

Tangier Ibn Battouta Airport is an international airport located in his hometown of Tangier, Morocco. Ibn Batouta Stadium in Tangier is also named after him.

He appears as a leader in Civilization VII, able to lead any civilization, including the Abbasid or Songhai in the Exploration Age.

== See also ==
- List of places visited by Ibn Battuta
- Ibn Fadhlan
- Ibrahim ibn Yaqub
- Benjamin of Tudela
- Ibn Sufi
