= Charles Defrémery =

French orientalist

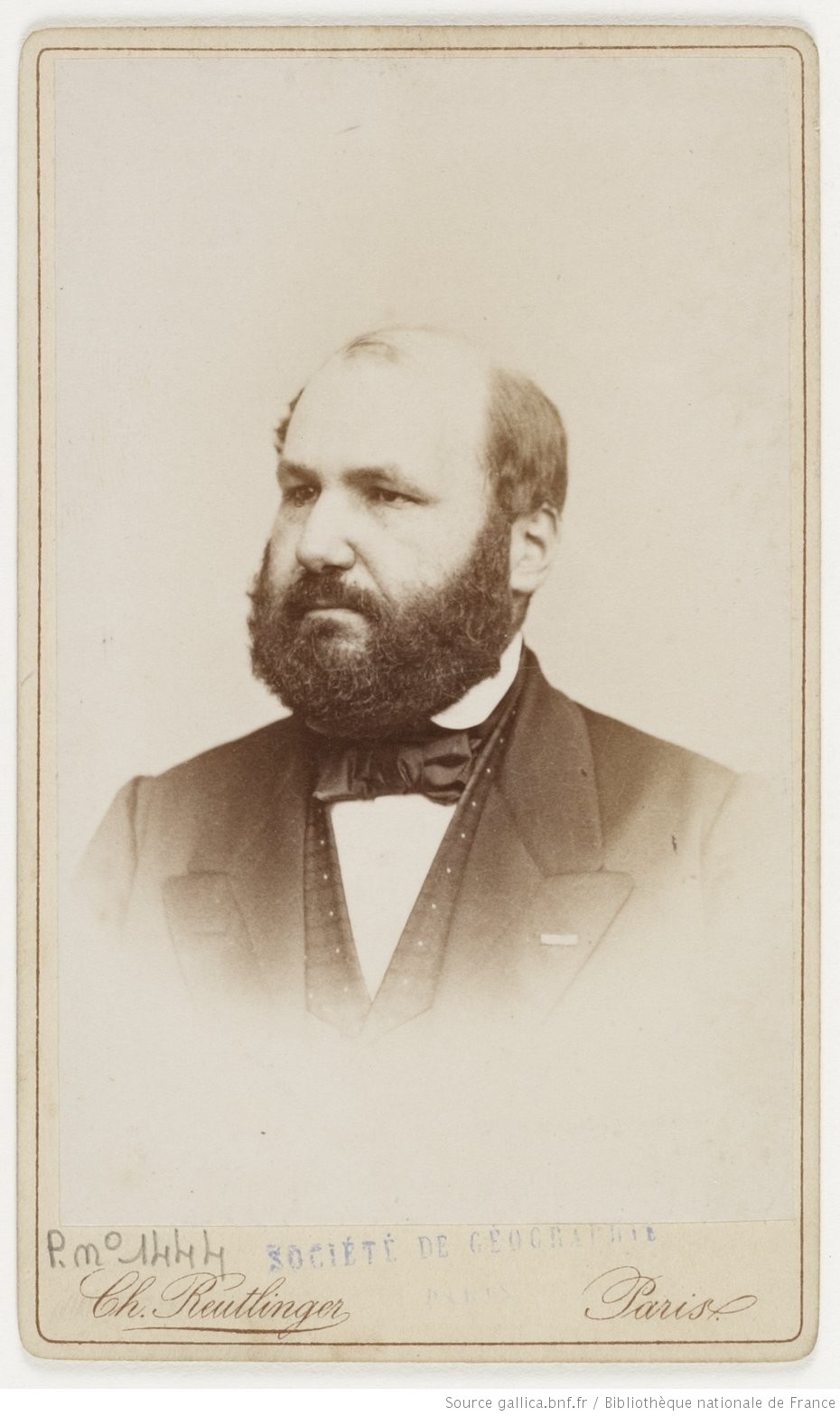
- Born: 8 December 1822; Cambrai (Nord)
- Died: 18 August 1883 (aged 60); Saint-Valery-en-Caux (Seine-Maritime)
- Occupation: Orientalist

Charles Defrémery (8 December 1822 – 18 August 1883) was a 19th-century French orientalist, specialist in Arabic and Persian history and literature.

He held the chair of Arabic language and literature at the École des langues orientales and was a member of the Société Asiatique of Paris. On 2 December 1860, he was appointed corresponding member of the St Petersburg Academy of Sciences for the Oriental literary department. He was elected a member of the Académie des inscriptions et belles-lettres in 1869. From 1871, he held the chair of Arabic at the Collège de France.

== Selected works ==
- 1842: Histoire des sultans du Kharezm, par Mirkhond. Texte persan, accompagné de notes historiques, géographiques et philologiques
- 1845: Histoire des Samanides, par Mirkhond. Texte persan, traduit et accompagné de notes critiques, historiques et géographiques
- 1854: Voyages d'Ibn Battuta (4 volumes, 1853–1859)
- 1854: Mémoires d'histoire orientale, suivis de Mélanges de critique, de philologie et de géographie
- 1858: Gulistan, ou le Parterre de roses, par Sadi, traduit du persan et accompagné de notes historiques, géographiques et littéraires
