= Muhammad al-Abdari al-Hihi =

Moroccan travel writer

Al-Abdari al-Hihi
- محمد العبدري الحاحي
- Born: Abu Abdallah Mohammed ibn Mohammed ibn Ali ibn Ahmed ibn Masoud ibn Hajj al-Abdari al-Hihi; Haha
- Occupations: Travel writer, Qadi (Judge)
- Known for: Al-Rihlah al-Maghribiyyah

Abu Abdallah Mohammed ibn Mohammed ibn Ali ibn Ahmed ibn Masoud ibn Hajj al-Abdari al-Hihi (Arabic: محمد العبدري الحاحي) (fl. ca. 1289) was a Moroccan travel writer. He was born among the Haha, a Berber tribe in the south of Morocco. He is the author of The Moroccan Journey (Al-Rihlah al-magribiyyah), an account of his journey to Mecca in 1289, originally entitled Rihlat al-Abdari (al-Abdari's Journey). It was published by the Ministry of Education (ed. Muhammad al-Fasi, Rabat, 1968).)

The section of the al-Rihla al-Maghreibiyya describing places in Palestine was copied by Ibn Juzayy in 1354-1355 when writing an account of the travels of Ibn Battuta. al-Abdari was also the grand Qadi (judge) of Marrakesh.

(He is not to be confused with Mohammed ibn Hajj al-Abdari al-Fasi or Mohammed Ibn Mohammed ibn Mohammed Abu Abdallah Ibn al-Hajj al-Abdari al-Qayrawani al-Fasi al-Tilamsi, (ca. 1258 - 1336), the author of Madkhal Ash-Shara Ash-Shareef Ala Al-Mathahib, or "Introduction to Islamic Jurisprudence According to Schools of Thought".)
