= Daniel P. Mannix =

American writer (1911–1997)

Daniel Pratt Mannix IV
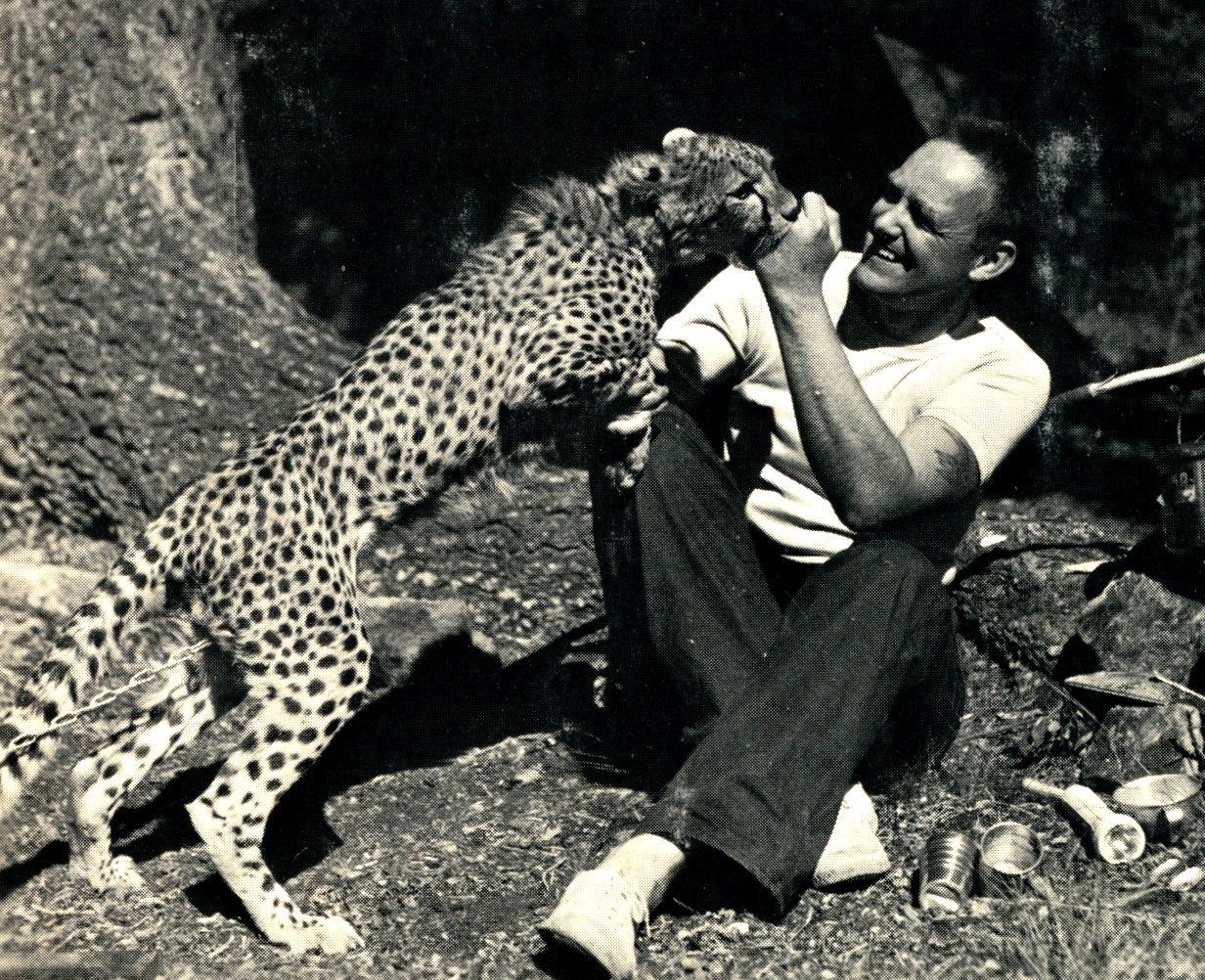
- Daniel P. Mannix with his trained cheetah Rani
- Born: October 27, 1911; Bryn Mawr, Pennsylvania, US
- Died: January 29, 1997 (aged 85); East Whiteland, near Malvern, Pennsylvania, US
- Education: University of Pennsylvania
- Occupation: Writer
- Spouse: Jule Junker (m. 1939; died 1977)
- Children: 2
- Writing career
- Notable works: Step Right Up! (1951); Tales of the African Frontier with J.A. Hunter (1954); Those About to Die (1958); Black Cargoes with Malcolm Cowley (1962); All Creatures Great and Small (1963); The Fox and the Hound (1967)
- Notable awards: Dutton Animal Book Award (1967); Athenaeum of Philadelphia literary award (1967); American Academy of Arts and Letters – Literature (1973)

Daniel Pratt Mannix IV (October 27, 1911 – January 29, 1997) was an American writer, journalist, photographer, sideshow performer, stage magician, animal trainer, and filmmaker. One of his two best-known works is the 1958 book Those About to Die (republished in 2001 as The Way of the Gladiator), which was inspiration for the Ridley Scott film Gladiator in 2000 and the TV drama Those About to Die on Peacock. The other is the 1967 novel The Fox and the Hound, which was loosely adapted into an animated feature film by Walt Disney Productions in 1981.

== Early life ==
The Mannix family had a long history of service in the U.S. Navy, and Mannix' father, Daniel P. Mannix, III, was an American naval officer. His mother would often join her husband on his postings, and the Mannix children would stay at their grandparents' farm outside Philadelphia. The young Mannix was an avid reader of books in his grandparents' library. He commented that "On rainy days, I sat in the library and read. During their 200-year residence in Pennsylvania, my family had built up a library containing at least one volume devoted to any conceivable subject". It was there that Mannix also began to keep and raise various wild animals. He wrote fictionalized stories about his animals (supposedly to cover the cost of feeding them) in his first two books, The Back-Yard Zoo, and More Back-Yard Zoo. The Back-Yard Zoo was published in 1934, while he was a senior in college.

Following family tradition, Mannix had enrolled in the U.S. Naval Academy in 1930, but he could not adjust to the rigorous training. Finally, the commandant wrote a letter to his father saying that "he is definitely not officer material" and he left the academy. In recounting this experience, Mannix wrote that after leaving, he was so worn down that spent the next two months in bed. However, the following year he was accepted by the University of Pennsylvania where he earned a degree in journalism which he took up after failing zoology.

Mannix married Jule Junker in 1939 and she became a partner in his adventures. Their family was listed in the Philadelphia Social Register. A writer and friend of the family wrote: "Families like the Mannix family are also referred to as being from 'old money', although if economic circumstances changed, they might become known as 'fallen aristocracy'".

== Career ==
Mannix served as a naval lieutenant with the Photo-Science Laboratory in Washington, D.C. during World War II, where he was tasked with creating training films. His civilian career could briefly be described as engaging in various adventurous activities which he filmed for lectures or wrote about in magazines and books. The latter were often enhanced with illustrations by accomplished artists or by his own photographs. He also kept a small menagerie of wild and domestic animals which allowed him to study their behavior and then feature them in print and film. His interest in unsavory, even horrifying, human behavior and attitudes was also featured in some of his books. However, he was also interested in gentler topics such as L. Frank Baum and his books about the land of Oz.

=== Carnival life ===
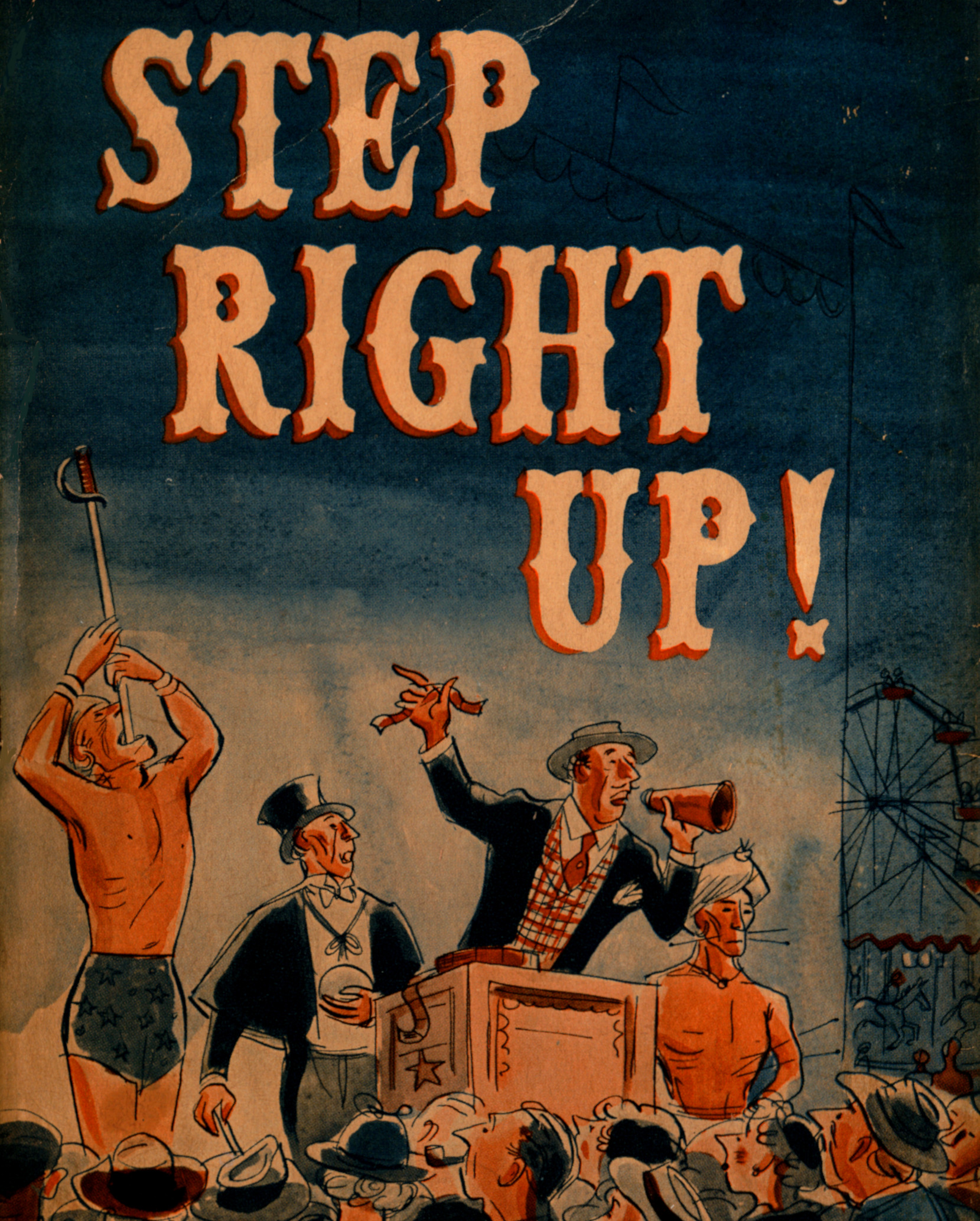
Dustjacket illustration by Leo Hershfield for Step Right Up by Daniel P. Mannix, Harper & Brothers, 1951.

Mannix joined a traveling carnival after college where he learned to be a sword swallower, fire eater, stage magician, escape artist, mind reader, and lock picker, performing under the stage name The Great Zadma. His magazine articles about these experiences, with his wife Jule Junker Mannix, proved popular and were later expanded into book form in his 1951 account of carnival life, Step Right Up, which in turn was reprinted in 1964 as Memoirs of a Sword Swallower. He claimed that he held the record for many years for swallowing the longest sword (26 inches) although there is no documented proof of that.

At the conclusion of Step Right Up, Mannix stated that while still in the carnival (and still single) he borrowed a typewriter from the carnival manager and submitted the manuscript of his first article, How to Swallow a Sword to Colliers magazine and that shortly before he left the carnival, he received notice that it had been accepted. His dream of becoming a freelance writer seemed to be becoming a reality. In the final lines of the book, he wrote "I made up my mind. That night I packed my suitcase, left a note for the Impossible [stage name of his mentor at the Carnival] and started east in my car. In my inside pocket was the letter from Colliers asking for a series of articles based on carnival life. And on the seat beside me was a second-hand typewriter I'd purchased from the carnival manager."

The Colliers articles were published from 1944 to 1947. These dates appear inconsistent with the Step Right Up account (i.e.: artistic license was taken in the book), since they were years after his marriage to Jule Mannix in 1939. In any event, most of them were published under the by-line, The Great Zadma as told to Jule Junker Mannix. How to Swallow a Sword, 1944, the first in the series, was printed in condensed form in the Reader's Digest in 1945.

A review in The New Yorker magazine described Step Right Up as "A sympathetic and funny account of life with a carnival by a young man who impulsively joined up with one, mastered the elements of fire-eating and sword-swallowing in record time, and then rose, Horatio Alger-like, into the rarefied company of neon-bulb swallower, a coterie whose prestige is offset by a phenomenally high mortality rate." Another review noted that "Step Right Up is not merely Mannix's story but the story of the people he lived with [in the carnival] — how they thought, acted and felt". There's Krinko, the human pincushion who drives a nail through his tongue; Jolly Daisy, the 700-pound fat woman who describes how she feels about her role in life; skinny May who manages huge snakes; Bronko, the cowboy, who can't ride a horse; etc. One of the weirdest in the reviewer's opinion was "the Human Ostrich – He swallowed any and everything he could stuff into his mouth. 'Any object I swallow I regurgitate afterward. The rats are never hurt, neither are the frogs. Before swallowing a frog I always drink a quart of water to give the little fellows something to land in as frogs have feelings just like anyone else' ".

In an author's note, Mannix said that he worked "under canvas" for nearly three years and although sideshow feats (such as swallowing neon lightbulbs or swallowing live rats and frogs and bringing them back up again) might seem incredible to most people, he "either performed or saw performed all the stunts I tell about in this book". He added, "Except for combining the events of chronologically separated occasions into one summer, I've told the story of a traveling American carnival as I experienced it—only changing the names of the people with whom I worked".

The dustjacket illustration by Leo Hershfield (illustrator, cartoonist, and courtroom artist) for the 1951 hardcover edition of Step Right Up conveys the tongue-in-cheek style of the writing. He also did the black and white sketches at the beginning of each chapter.

=== Hunting, safaris and films ===
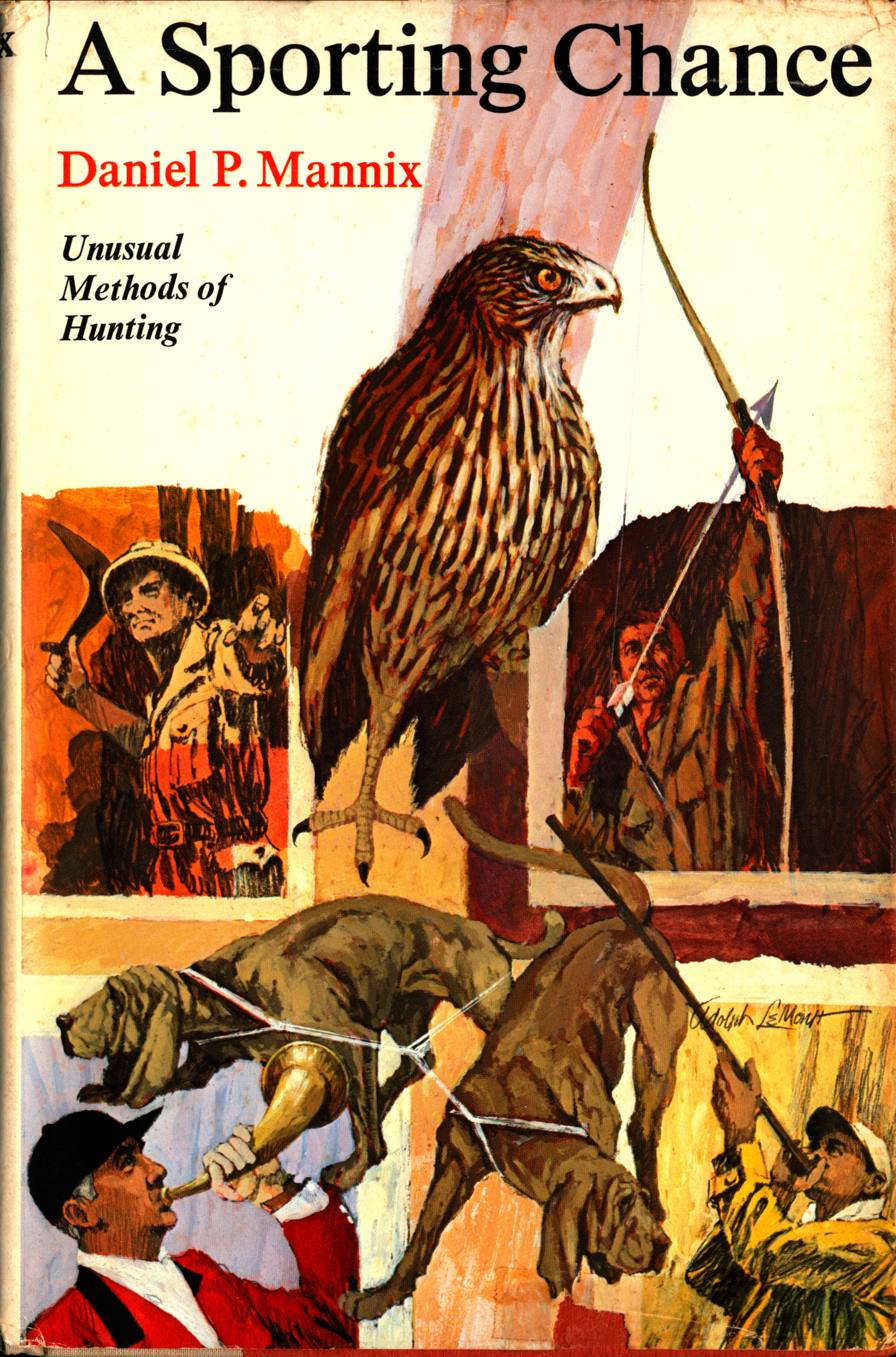
Dustjacket illustration by Adolph LeMoult for A Sporting Chance by Daniel P. Mannix, E. P. Dutton, 1967.

As illustrated in a cover art montage by Adolph LeMoult for his book, A Sporting Chance, Mannix engaged in various ancient/traditional forms of hunting, i.e. with a blowgun, boomerang, bow and arrow, and trained hawks and hounds. He also hunted with a trained cheetah, otter, cormorants and more. In addition, he collaborated on books with J. A. Hunter, a big game hunter in East Africa and Peter Ryhiner, a collector of large animals for zoos and circuses.

One of the Mannix's most memorable hunting experiences was hunting iguanas on horseback with an eagle near Taxco, Mexico. Universal Studios took an interest after an account was published in a magazine article. He and his wife then restaged the hunt for a Universal camera crew, and it was released as a two-reel featurette film, Eagle Versus Dragon, in 1944. It was shot with a 16 mm camera for economic reasons and converted to 32 mm so it could be shown in movie theaters where it was advertised as "Eagle vs. Dragon! The Thrilling Story of a Giant American Eagle Battling Prehistoric Monsters". A reviewer commented, "The short, photographed in Mexico, shows the huge bird landing gracefully on the arm of good-looking Jewel [sic] Mannix in some of the most beautiful real-life filming on record".

His skills as a falconer and bird trainer were also showcased in the 1956 short film Universal Color Parade: Parrot Jungle, in which he is credited as the writer, actor, director, producer, photographer, and bird trainer. The film was made in collaboration with John Hamlet, coauthor of Birds of Prey of the World, mentor to Jim Fowler, and who at one time maintained an exhibit of over 100 living raptor species at an attraction near Ocala, Florida.

In a related undertaking, he wrote the screen play for an Oscar nominated short film, The Boy and the Eagle, (1949) starring and narrated by Dicky Moore about a crippled boy and a wounded eagle that he nursed back to health. The eagle later saves the boy from a rattlesnake and in the excitement, the boy discovers he can walk. While the film has a story arc, its main focus is on the training of the eagle, so much so that it takes on the aspect of a training film on falconry. The film was directed and produced by a friend and fellow falconer, William R. Lasky, son of Jesse L. Lasky, founder of Paramount Studios. He used Mannix's eagle to play that part.

The couple also filmed hunting coyotes with their cheetah in the American West, fishermen harpooning manta rays in Mexico, and big game in Kenya. The last of these was filmed with J.A. Hunter and includes a scene of a rhinoceros charging their vehicle, only to turn away when Hunter and a guide shouted and waved their arms. His picture of a wounded manta ray leaping from the water was published in Life magazine. The films were used in lecture tours around the United States.

=== Small menagerie ===
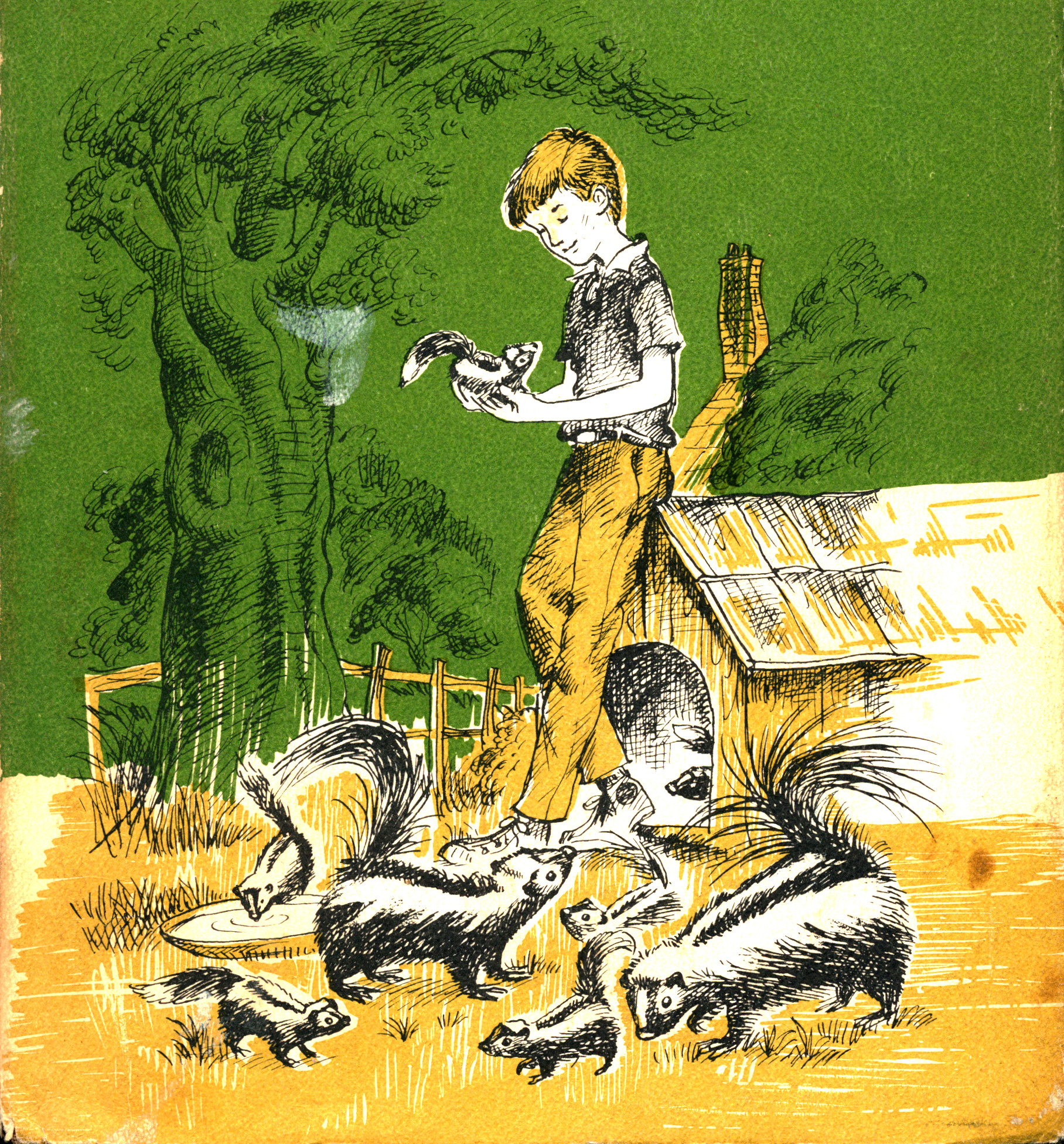
Dustjacket illustration by Leonard Shortall for The Outcasts by Daniel P. Mannix, E.P. Dutton, 1965.

Mannix was a keen observer of animal behavior and incorporated his observations into his writing. For example, in his book All Creatures Great and Small, Mannix described how as a boy he stayed at his grandparents' country house and kept a variety of wild animals including a porcupine, armadillo, crow, even an alligator. Among the more surprising of these were skunks with intact anal glands fully capable of spraying anyone disturbing them. The protagonist in his book, The Outcasts, is a young city boy, who similar to Mannix's experience, is now living in a country house and has adopted a skunk family. It's a fun children's book. As one review put it: "this is good fiction and, face it, there is nothing funnier than a full skunk in brisk action at this age level". The book was illustrated by Leonard Shortall, the children's book illustrator known for his artwork for the then popular Encyclopedia Brown series and other children's books. The boy on the cover could be imagined as a young Mannix.

After his marriage he began keeping what are generally perceived as less docile animals. Many of these are describe in Jule Mannix's book, Adventure Happy: The Story of My Marriage to a Small Menagerie. All Creatures Great and Small includes photographs of Mannix with a golden eagle on his gauntleted fist, Jule Mannix on horseback with a bald eagle, their young daughter sitting next to a cheetah, and their son with a rock python draped around his neck. Pictures of other animals in their menagerie (and some from when he was a boy) include: kinkajous, a coati-mundi, a vampire bat being fed blood with an eyedropper, a caracara, cormorants being trained to fish, a large iguana held by Jule Mannix, a peregrine falcon, a goshawk, a porcupine, skunks, a possum, a cheetah leaping from their car in pursuit of a jackrabbit, a spider monkey and an otter eating a freshly caught fish. True The Men's Magazine published over 60 of his articles, mostly about the animals in his menagerie. Some were trained for hunting or fishing. His book, A Sporting Chance: Unusual Methods of Hunting describes these experiences.

One of his objectives in keeping the animals was to get a better understanding of their behaviors and their interactions with humans so he could better represent them in his books and articles. For example, in preparation for his award-winning book, The Fox and The Hound, Mannix spent more than a year studying the behaviors of a mated pair of foxes that he kept at his home. He stated that they were "so tame [that he] could turn them loose and watch them hunt, fight, make love, and live an almost normal life." Additionally, he studied wild foxes and interviewed trappers, hunters, game wardens, and "Masters of Hounds" to learn what they felt foxes would and would not do. In the novel's postscript, Mannix discusses this research. To defend his novel against charges of improbability, he recounts his observations of wild foxes and discusses other people's stories about fox behavior. Regarding the actions Tod, the fox, takes in eluding the hunters, he details both witnessing wild foxes performing such acts and stories others shared with him that he used as a basis for some of the story's events. For example, he notes that while people have told him that foxes do not really run among sheep or cattle herds to escape hounds, he himself used to watch them do just that from his bedroom window. In the case of a fox running along train tracks as a train is approaching, Mannix drew on a story told to him by a master of hunting in the area of Whitford Sales—near Thorndale, Pennsylvania—who had to stop hunting in the area because of a fox who consistently killed pursuing hounds on the Trenton Cutoff using this method.

=== Death of Grace Olive Wiley ===
In his role as a photo-journalist, Mannix witnessed the death of the famed herpetologist Grace Olive Wiley when she was fatally bitten by a venomous snake. He had just completed an article about her but needed additional photographs. So on July 20, 1948, Wiley, then 64 years old, invited Mannix and his wife to her home in Cypress, California, to get the additional photographs of her with the snakes. She posed for him with an Indian cobra she had recently acquired. Before taking the picture, she took off her glasses to look better, she said. This may have impaired her vision and contributed to the accident. She then placed her flat palm in front of the snake, This is normally fairly safe for an expert because, unlike vipers like rattlesnakes which stab with their fangs, cobra teeth are small, and they need to bite and chew to inject venom. Their mouths are not large enough to bite a comparatively large flat surface like a palm. It was a maneuver that she had demonstrated to Mannix in a previous interview. However, on this occasion the snake was able to bite her finger just as he was taking a picture.

When asked if she had antivenom serum she replied "I don't keep any serums. I have so many different kinds of snakes and each requires a different serum, I couldn't afford them all and they would go bad in a few months. I just never thought this would happen." Mannix attempted to put a rubber tourniquet on her finger from her snake-bite kit, but the rubber was old and it broke. He was forced to use his handkerchief as a makeshift substitute. Wiley did have vials of strychnine, which she erroneously thought could delay the effects of the venom. Jule Mannix's first attempt to inject the strychnine failed when the vial broke in her hand. She selected another vial but found that the hypodermic needle needed to inject it was rusty. Finally she found a less rusty needle; and, with encouragement from Wiley, she injected the strychnine. (Jule Mannix: "I'm afraid it will hurt". Wiley: "Now don't worry dear. I know you will do it very well".) While waiting for an ambulance, Wiley lay on the floor but requested that a newspaper be put under her head to keep her hair from getting dirty. She was taken to Long Beach Municipal Hospital, but the hospital only had antivenom serums for North American snakes. Wiley was placed in an iron lung to assist her breathing, but to no avail; she died less than two hours after being bitten.

Mannix published an account of the incident, which included pictures of Wiley with the cobra that bit her, several months later in True, The Man's Magazine. In 1954, Jule Mannix adapted the account for her book, Adventure Happy. Mannix wrote about it again in 1963 for his book All Creatures Great and Small.

=== Books ===
==== Variety ====
Mannix's first books were the previously mentioned Back-Yard Zoo books and Step Right Up. After which he wrote on a wide variety of topics in styles tailored for readers with various interests. His books ranged from fictional stories with young, somewhat outcast protagonists who had animals as best friends (e.g. The Outcasts), novels for adults featuring animal characters with detailed, minimally anthropomorphic, depictions of their behavior based on personal experience, sympathetic accounts of carnival performers and sideshow freaks (written in a very personal and warm manner), and adventurous accounts about hunting or collecting big game (which "should bring the adventure and flavor of the jungle roaring, hissing and stampeding into the living room better than the television screen").

He also wrote about sensational adult topics such as a biography of the occultist Aleister Crowley (a book "of no interest to the serious scholar"), and the Hellfire Club (a book with "unsubstantiated" accounts of Hell-Fire Club activities ... emphasizing the fantastic and the controversial). His book, Those About to Die was criticized by a well-known Oxford historian and historical fiction writer as being the worst novel ever written set in the ancient world. He cites a sentence in the opening paragraph describing the Roman Empire as "coming apart like an unraveling sweater". In response, another reviewer commented, "Daniel Mannix is rather frowned upon in serious circles because, I suspect, he writes highly readable ('enjoyable' isn't quite the right word) studies of the darker side of human nature, and explores some of the most disturbing episodes in our history".

==== Sensational realism ====
A long review of Those About To Die in the Los Angeles Times noted that "Some historians may disapprove of the author's methods, but there is a curious logic about them". As might be expected, he visited the Colosseum and sites in Pompeii frequented by the gladiators to accurately describe the setting. But he went well beyond that. "For example, in describing the venatores' battle with the lions and tigers, he drew on Martial and Strabo as original sources, some later scholarly histories, J.A. Hunter's account of Masai warriors spearing lions, and comments by Mel Koontz [trainer of the MGM lion mascot] and other professional lion tamers". A substantial portion of the book (Chapters 5 to 12) is a fictional representation of the exploits of Carpophorus, the most famous venator, whose performance at the inauguration of the Flavian Amphitheatre [i.e.: the Coliseum] was immortalized in a poem by Martial, who compared him to Hercules.

Mannix provided a wealth of detail in Those About To Die; for example, in his account of chariot racing he described "the training of the drivers, the betting techniques, the harnessing of the horses" as well as the racing stud farms. Initially the games were rather tame, featuring acrobats, wire walkers, trained animals and perhaps a sham battle. They evolved over time to include actual battles between armies and even a naval battle fought on an artificial lake that required thousands of men 11 years to build. These spectacles became a narcotic for the audience who became a howling, cruel and lustful mob. The popularity of top gladiators and charioteers was like that of today's top celebrities, only more so." According to Mannix, the fanatic love of chariot racing had a name: Hippomania: horse-madness. He wrote that "When Felix, a famous charioteer for the Reds [one of four charioteer companies identified by the color of their tunics], was killed in a race and his body burned on a funeral pyre, a man threw himself into the flame so he could perish with his idol". Although his vivid (perhaps overly vivid for some) style of writing was frowned on by scholars, the review concludes that all was "told in effective prose and intriguing detail in this unusual volume".

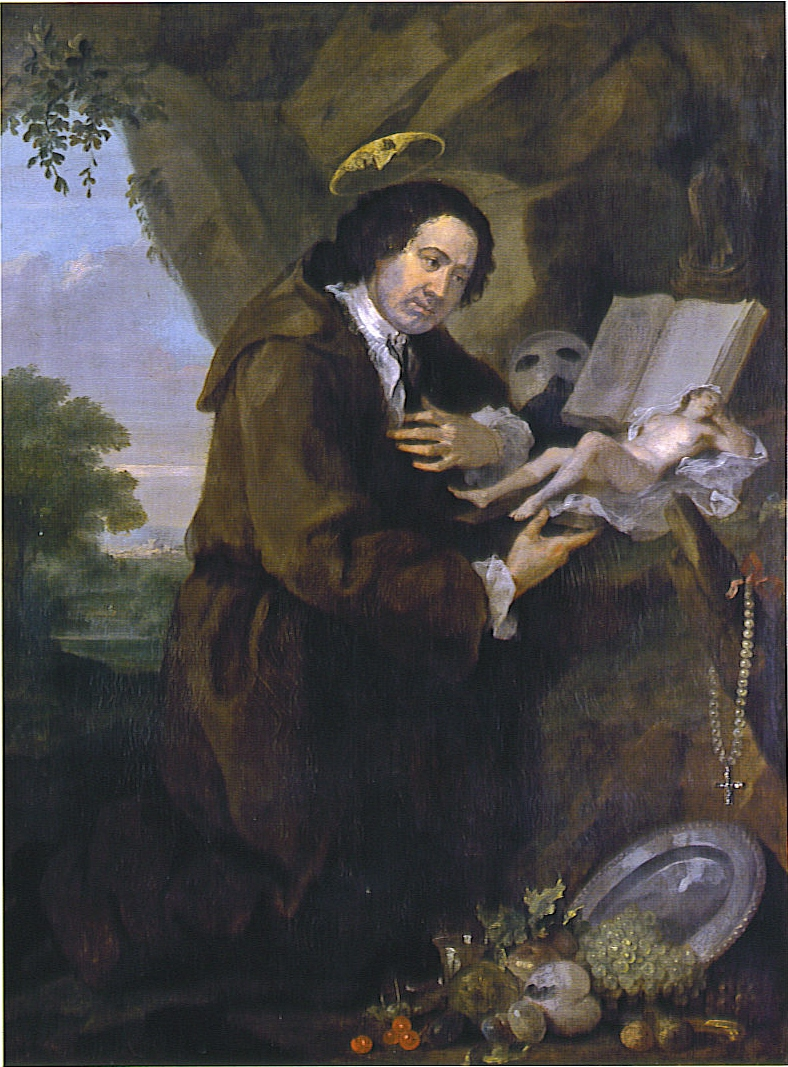
Portrait of Sir Francis Dashwood (which he commissioned) by William Hogarth from the late 1750s, parodying Renaissance images of Francis of Assisi. Dashwood, central character in Mannix's The Hellfire Club, was one of the leaders of the Friars of St. Francis (aka the Hellfire Club).

One of Mannix's most sensational books was The Hellfire Club, (1959), a 35-cent Ballantine paperback. As noted above, it was decried by scholars; furthermore, as history, it was superseded by an authoritative treatise by Evelyn Lord. Its tone was immediately obvious from the cover which depicted two lecherous monks, each fondling a receptive woman. Nevertheless, Mannix was praised in the popular press for "making of an assumedly risqué dissertation a tremendously engrossing 18th Century political history of the finest merit".

There were a number of Hellfire Clubs but the one highlighted by Mannix was hosted by Sir Francis Dashwood. As described by Mannix (and recounted in a review in The Times of Munster Indiana), the club conducted mock religious ceremonies and engaged with prostitutes dressed as nuns. At the end of the evening members participated in drunken, supposedly intellectual, discussions. In his research, Mannix uncovered many unusual historical facets, some particularly relevant to an American readership. In his telling, John Wilkes, a prominent member of the club and parliament, became known as the "American Colonist's 'Greatest Friend'", while in fact he supported the colonies simply to aggravate King George III. He was successful in stirring up the king's anger against himself and the colonies. When Wilkes was arrested, he was so popular in the Americas that the South Carolina government sent funds to help him out (supposedly "to pay his whoring bills"). Mannix noted that when Benjamin Franklin went to England to advocate for the colonies he tried to enlist the help of Sir Francis. When that was not forthcoming, he still joined in Hellfire Club activities.

With respect to these particular claims, they are somewhat consistent with the views of historians. For example, Evelyn Lord concluded that "sex was clearly part of the Friars' activities" and that women playing the role of "nuns" participated. However, although Benjamin Franklin and Dashwood became friends they did not meet in person until 1772, after the Friars had been disbanded. Dashwood, then Chancellor of the Exchequer, had contacted Franklin for advice about economics. After this, Franklin became a regular visitor to Dashwood's abbey. He described its gardens (which had an erotic theme) as a paradise. Concerning Wilkes, Arthur H. Cash, author of his Pulitzer Prize finalist biography, stated that he was a strong advocate for the Colonies, as well as civil liberty, and did not question his motives. He also noted that the Commons House of South Carolina did attempt (although blocked by the governor) to send money to pay Wilkes debts, but these were incurred primarily as a result of his impulsive borrowing.

Portions of Mannix's book expand on stories in Chrysal, or The Adventures of a Guinea, a farce ridiculing the British leisured class, by Charles Johnstone. For example, he includes one in which Dashwood, in a fevered state, has an hallucination of a four-eye devil when he sees two cats copulating outside his window. As Dashwood is crying for mercy and the female cat is caterwauling, his tutor, still in his nightgown, rushes in to see what's wrong. Dashwood mistakes him for a saint who has come to warn him of the consequences of his sinful ways. The comedy continues in a similar vein. Mannix tells the story, with added details of his own, as if it were true, perhaps to tease the reader.

==== Serious historical accounts ====
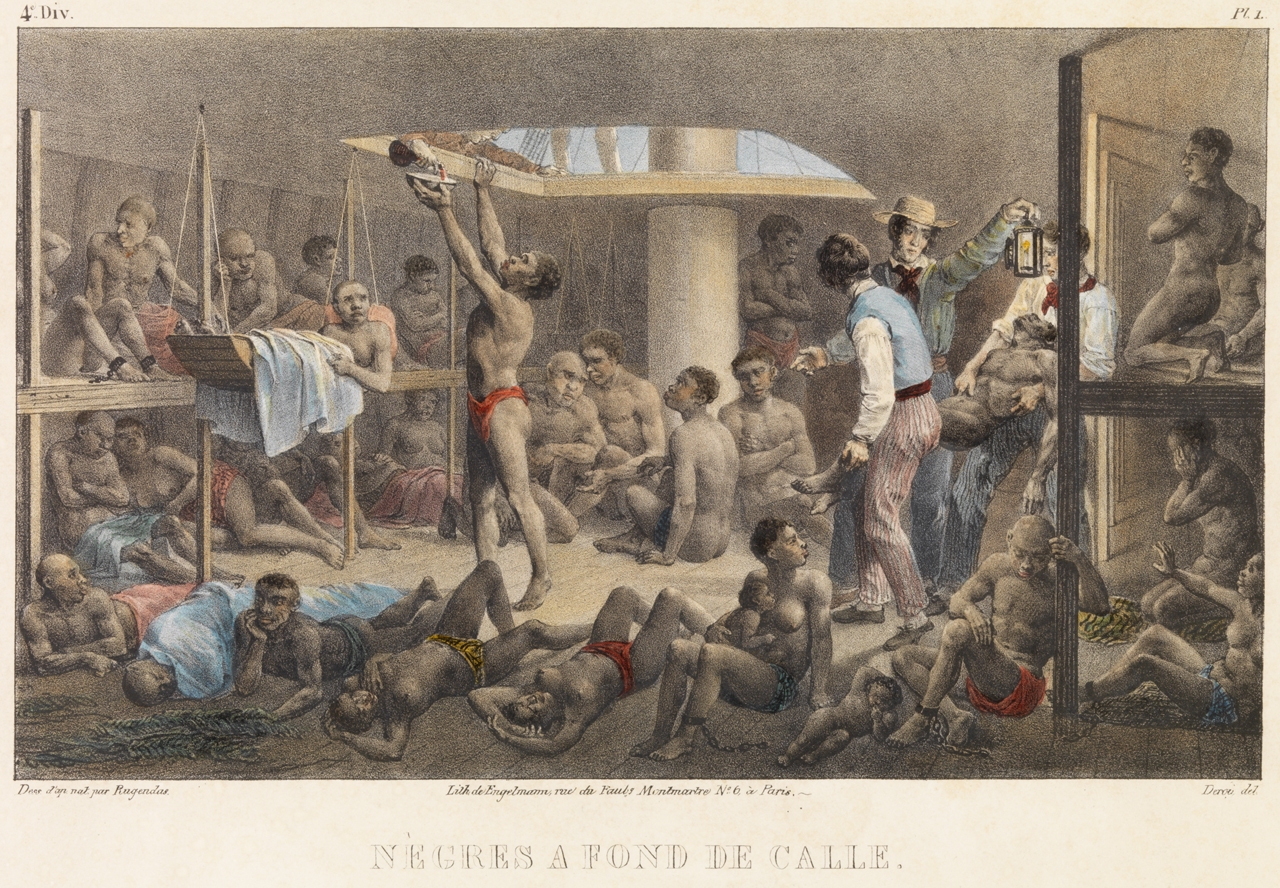
Print by Johann Moritz Rugendas, Nègres a fond de Calle, taken from Voyage pittoresque dans le Brésil, published in 1835. A reduced color reproduction of this print was used on the dust cover of Black Cargoes.

On the other hand, some of his works received positive reviews from scholars, for example Black Cargoes: A History of the Atlantic Slave Trade 1518–1865 (1962) written in collaboration with Malcolm Cowley. A reviewer in The Journal of Negro History wrote: "This is not, perhaps, the definitive scholarly study of the Atlantic slave trade. I am not sure that the authors intended it to be. It is, however, a savage indictment of all those connected with what Wilberforce called "this bloody traffic", written in such a style as to make it easy but not pleasant reading". Another historian described it as "one of the canonical histories on the slave trade". Time, the popular news magazine at the time, did an extensive summary which included many of the disturbing details.

However, in 1981, James A. Rawley published The Transatlantic Slave Trade, A History, which was described in The New York Times Book Review section as a drier account than Black Cargoes but more reliable and thorough. While the newer work was said to correct many misconceptions and stereotypes, it was criticized as "coldly detached' and "miss[ing] the human side of the story". Thus it could play into a kind of "moral amnesia ... apparently welcomed by many whites".

The dust cover on Black Cargoes included a reduced color reproduction of a print by Johann Moritz Rugendas, Nègres a fond de Calle, 1835, which depicts the degrading conditions in the hull of a slave ship. The same illustration was used in the Time magazine article.

With respect to another of his more serious works, his contribution to The Old Navy: The Glorious Heritage of the U.S. Navy, Recounted through the Journals of an American Patriot by Rear Admiral Daniel P. Mannix, 3rd, his father's posthumously published autobiography was also well received. It is an account of his father's naval career from the Spanish–American War of 1898 until his retirement in 1928. A naval historian commented, "Daniel Pratt Mannix IV has done a commendable job in editing his father's papers. With assistance from the Naval History Division, he has produced a beguiling memoir of a navy moving from post-Civil War insularity to the threshold of world power".

==== Animal stories ====
Several of Mannix's books have animal protagonists. As described in The Animal Stories of Daniel P. Mannix, a 25-minute video on YouTube, they are anthropomorphic but are unique in having "authentic realistic style". For example, the animals have no understanding of human language beyond what might be expected. Copper, the hound in The Fox and The Hound, can only recognize his name and a few short expressions or commands. Tod, the fox, who was initially kept as a pet, does not know the name given by his owner and has no understanding of human language. Furthermore, there is no communication between the fox and the hound. Their perception of the world is largely based on scent. They engaged in natural behaviors that could seem unpalatable such as Cooper eating grass in order to throw up. In another book, The Last Eagle, while a mother eagle is very caring towards its young, the young do not care for each other. One young sibling kills another to get more food. Animal sexual activity is also briefly portrayed in some stories. Much of Mannix's insights stemmed from having kept and observed the animals he wrote about.

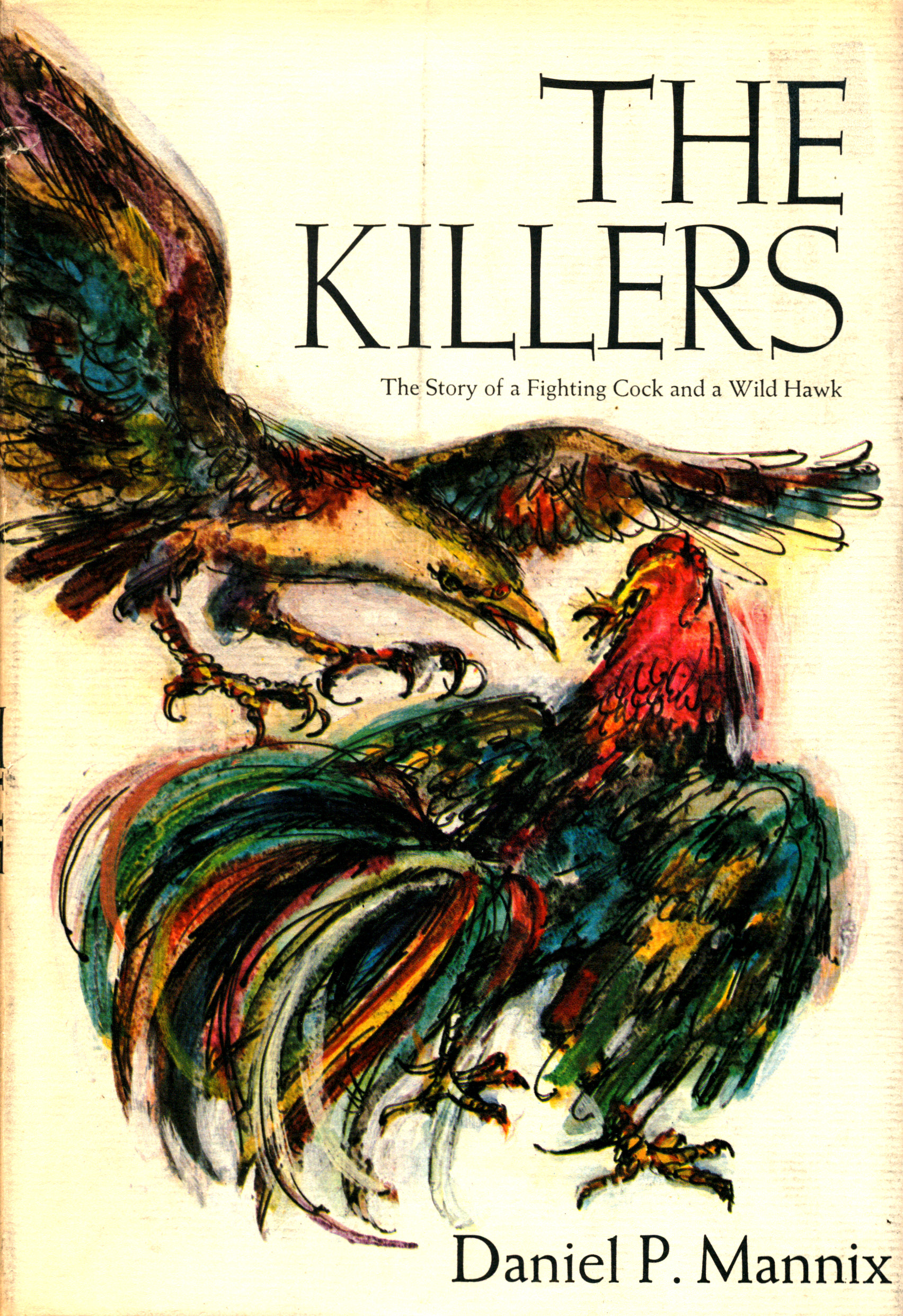
Dustjacket illustration by George Ford for The Killers by Daniel P. Mannix, E.P. Dutton, 1968.

Another feature of Mannix's animal books is that, while humans crave a sense of meaning in life, Mannix's animals have no such concept. In the clash between a gamecock and coopers hawk in The Killers neither is morally superior. This leads to greater uncertainty about the outcome, and perhaps greater suspense, since in typical story telling, the good guy usually wins. In an author's note cited in Sports Illustrated magazine Mannix wrote, "I feel the time has passed, when we can dismiss the feeding habits of predators by saying that they eat only harmful rats and mice. The role of the predator in nature is far too complicated and important for that well-meant deception". The review notes that a list of the hawks dietary victims "reads like the index to a field guide for bird watchers, ranging from the American redstart to the wax-wing" and also pheasants, quail and grouse. Its opponent is a gamecock that was raised to fight in a cockpit and was discarded after a police raid. George Ford's dustjacket illustration conveys the ferocity of the combat. Similar two-page black-and-white illustrations were included at the beginning of each chapter.

While social interaction among his animal characters is limited in some of his stories; they can be complex and alien. Wolves communicate using vocalizations, body postures, scent, touch, and taste. Mannix depicts how these were used to maintain a very sophisticated social structure of a wolf pack which terrorized medieval Paris. A review in the Charlotte News of Mannix's The Wolves of Paris, noted, "Mannix, a naturalist of some renown, knows his wolves, and although this tale is labeled a novel, it's the story of how the European wolf ... coped with medieval man and vice versa. He writes knowledgeably about the "social graces and taboos" of the pack.

His book, Troubled Waters, is told from the perspective of an escaped goldfish. It has an environmentalist theme and has less of a story structure than his other books. A New York Times reviewer concluded that it is a "somewhat tenuous story of a goldfish that ends in tragedy. But all the way through it is enriched with the natural history of a river, a brook and a pond, all being steadily destroyed by thoughtless mankind".

==== For and about children ====
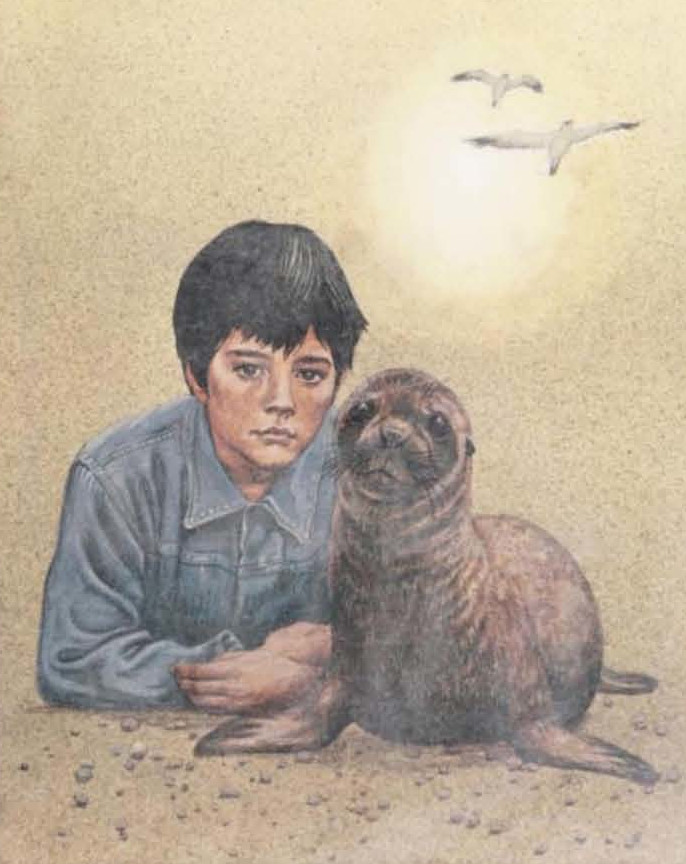
Dustjacket illustration by David K. Stone for Drifter by Daniel P. Mannix, Reader's Digest Press, 1974.

Mannix's book, The Outcasts (discussed above), about a boy and his skunks, was deemed appropriate for ages 7 to 11. Other books delt with heavier topics (pain, death and the hunting and the collecting of animals for commercial purposes) and had more sophisticated cultural references; as such, they were more appropriate for older readers. For example, in his book, Drifter, set in southern California, a boy named Jeddy and his father, Jeb Proudfoot, help a fisherman friend poach sea lions for captivity. Jeddy's job is to get through rough surf onto the rocky shore of an island breeding ground and scare the smaller females and bachelors into a specially designed net set near shore. In doing so, he breaks his leg and, although in great pain, comes away with a sea lion pup which he raises. He names it Drifter and they become close companions. Jeb Proudfoot is a hunter and can't understand his son's humane instincts. Jeddy is very reluctant to kill wild animals himself (except in dire circumstances), but he does help his father handle his various breeds of hunting dogs, each with a special purpose. It turns out that Jeb, who to others, appeared a simple man, has acquired a copy of The Master of Game by Edward the Duke of York. He considered it "holy scripture" and his hunting manual. Jed's last assignment ("beautifully staged" according to a New York Times review), as a guide for a couple of rich jaguar hunters, results in tragedy. (All of the hunting scenes in the book are quite intense.) As for Drifter, he is sold to a public marine aquarium, ("'Underwater World', an all wet Disneyland") where he is trained to perform tricks. Jeddy, now on his own and in need of a job, decides to become the show seal trainer to support himself, while going to college to study animal behavior with the likes of Konrad Lorenz and Nico Tinbergen as his models.

Typical of many of Mannix's books, Drifter had a historical foundation. For example, Jeddy's mentor at "Underwater World", Cap'n Billy, was taught by Captain Thomas Webb, America's first premier sea lion trainer. Mannix also included reverential references to accounts of sea lion catcher George McGuire and Mark Huling the trainer of Sharkey "the greatest performing seal that ever lived". Gary Bohan's 2022 book about Sharkey includes historical photographs of George McGuire and the capture of sea lions in his specially designed net deployed from a rowboat, similar to that in Mannix's account. Another example is Jeb and Jebby's animal dealer friend had who had worked for Henry Trefflich a well-known New York animal importer at the time, who supplied animals for zoos, circuses, and Hollywood studios.

He also included classic literary references, for example reference to The Master of Game noted above. In another example, Mannix has Cap'n Billy give Jebby a copy of The White Seal, about a white Steller sea lion, by Rudyard Kipling which was included in The Jungle Book. Cap'n Billy later asked Jebby if he believed it. Jebby responded "Sure I believe it ... I don't believe every word in it, but Kipling had the flair for telling stories with a meaning that give you a feel of something better than the truth does. A scientist can give you facts, but he can't give you a feeling. You've got to have a flair for that". This sentiment was echoed in Mannix's other works; for example, as justification for The Last Eagle in the "How I came to write this book" section which explains his attempt to raise public awareness of threats to the Bald Eagle at the time.

The dustjacket art for the original hard cover version of Drifter by David K. Stone was painted in a realistic style. It depicts the young Jeddy and Drifter looking evocatively at the reader.

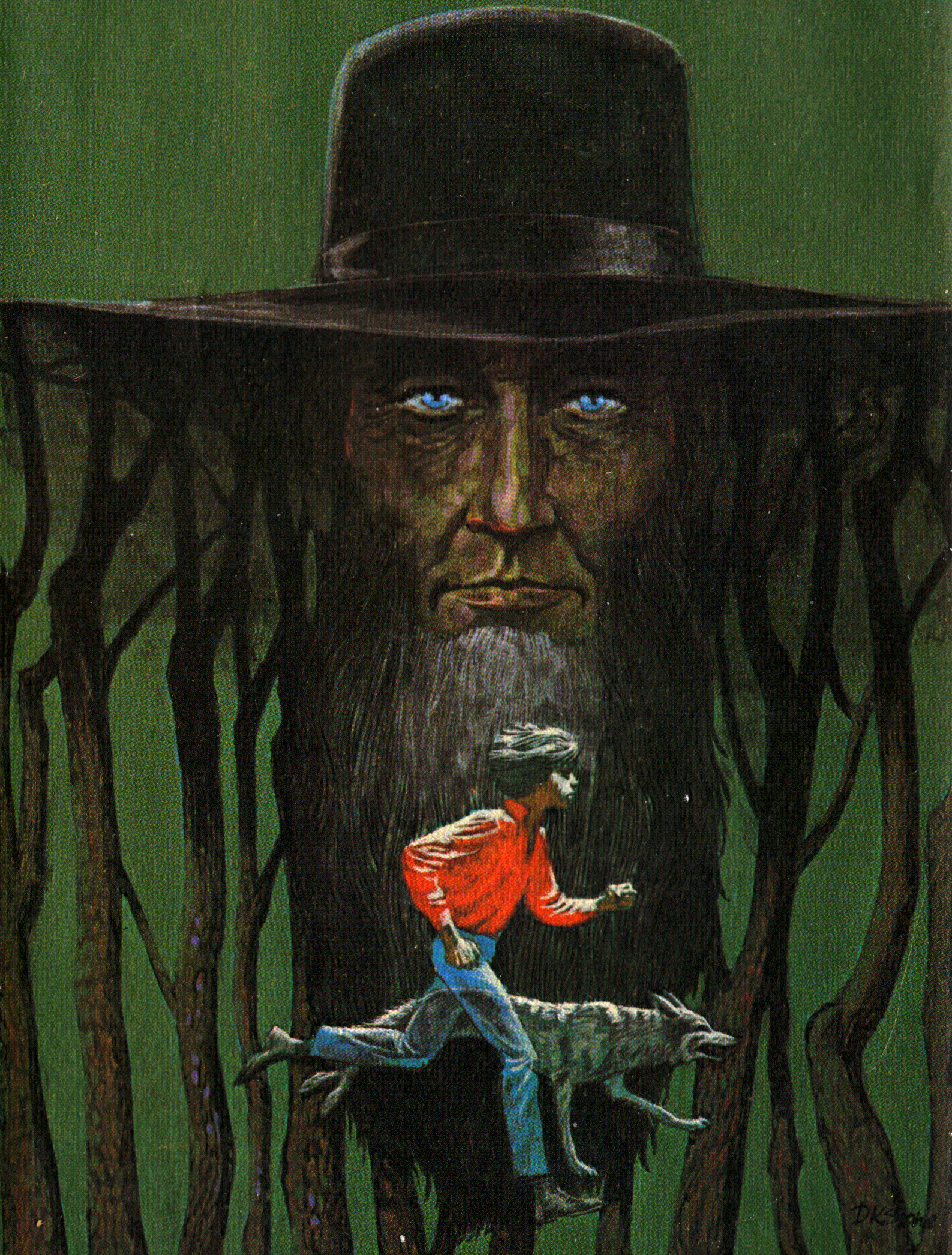
Dustjacket illustration by David K. Stone for The Healer by Daniel P. Mannix, Reader's Digest Press, 1971.

His book, The Healer, tells the story of a boy named Billy, who is sent from his unhappy home in the city to live with his great uncle in Pennsylvania Dutch Country. The great-uncle, Abe Zook, is a boucher (a folk herb healer with spiritual powers) and he becomes Billy's mentor. Among other things, Abe taught him how to find medicinal herbs, track honeybees to their nest, find garnet, collect ginseng for sale, cast spells and "outsmart the wild things of the woods even the werewolfen the boucher fears". But Billy befriends the werewolfen (a coyote and a large feral dog who live in the woods nearby). The coyote and dog mate and as reviewer, Barbara Hodge Hall, poignantly noted, "Only when the pair have coydog pups that become a menace to stock and even man, does the boy have to come to terms with the harsh realities that separate humans and animals".

As illustrated on the back dust cover, Mannix kept a coyote to prepare for his descriptions of coyote behavior. The front dust cover illustration by David K. Stone (also the illustrator for Drifter), shows Billy and the coyote running across a backdrop image of the mysterious looking boucher. David K. Stone was an accomplished commercial artist who did the cover illustrations for many science fiction and fantasy books.

The Healer was turned into a 1979 television movie that aired on The Wonderful World of Disney. It was retitled “Shadow of Fear” and starred Ike Eisenmann, Lisa Whelchel, and Joyce Van Patten.

In his book, The Secret of the Elms, three girls are called to their Grandmother's estate, The Elms, on the outskirts of Philadelphia's fashionable Main Line at the edge of Pennsylvania Dutch Country. She is dying and wants to get to know her granddaughters better so she can decide which one she should leave her estate to. The grandmother has an aversion to horses because her son, Clinton, was killed in a riding accident. Even so, Mary Ellen, the main protagonist rescues a miniature horse at an auction to save it from being slaughtered. She calls it Hobbit and eventually is able to wrangle a way to keep it. She is helped at key points by the Clinton's ghost and by Clinton's unacknowledged son also called Clinton. In the end, with the help of the Clintons (ghost and boy) and colorful Pennsylvania Dutch neighbors, Hobbit and Mary Ellen compete in the carriage event at the Devon Horse Show, a premier Main Line institution, and there are unexpected plot twists regarding inheritance.

The book received mixed reviews. One review called it a mélange of plot twists with stereotyped characters and ghostly elements that overwhelm the story. Reviewer, Barbara Hodge Hall, who had previously praised some of Mannix's other books including The Healer wrote that this one was best forgotten. On the other hand, another reviewer called it flawed but fast moving and enjoyable In any event, it highlights Mannix's interests and experience and the way he weaves these into his stories. For example, there are many references to the Wizard of Oz, a topic of great interest to Mannix as described below; detailed accounts of the young Clinton hunting for small game with his ferret and hawk, also in Mannix's realm of expertise; as well as a great deal of information about the Devon Horse Show, with which the Mannix family has had a strong connection for generations. In the 1991 show, for example, Mannix's 11-month-old granddaughter entered in a wicker-basket saddle in the lead class for children under 4 years old. She was the youngest entrant.

==== Historical fiction ====
The protagonists in most of Mannix's fictional books are children or animals set in 20th century America. However, his book Kiboko follows the exploits of a disillusioned southern American Civil War seaman, Thomas Rutledge, who became a slave trader, transporting slaves to Brazil. The title refers to the Swahili name for the whip used to control the African captives. He gave up the slave trade after it became unprofitable and took up ivory trading instead. He partnered with "Adi bin Zayd, called 'Binbin' by the natives in imitation of the sound of his terrible guns ... a Zanzibar Arab who had made himself virtual king of East Africa". With Binbin's help, he eventually became a pasha of a kingdom on the shores of Lake Victoria after overthrowing a king who had an Amazon guard which turned against him. Then when the British began to colonize the kingdom, Rutledge led a great battle to oppose them. While Mannix admitted that the story was exaggerated, there was such a land and lake battle near the shores of Lake Victoria. And he noted that, after he finished the manuscript, he found reference to a "Mr. Stokes", a suspected slaver, who became a sort of grand vizier to the king and who participated in the battle on the side of the local tribe. Mannix also noted that his description of the Amazon warriors was based on the Dahomey Amazons.

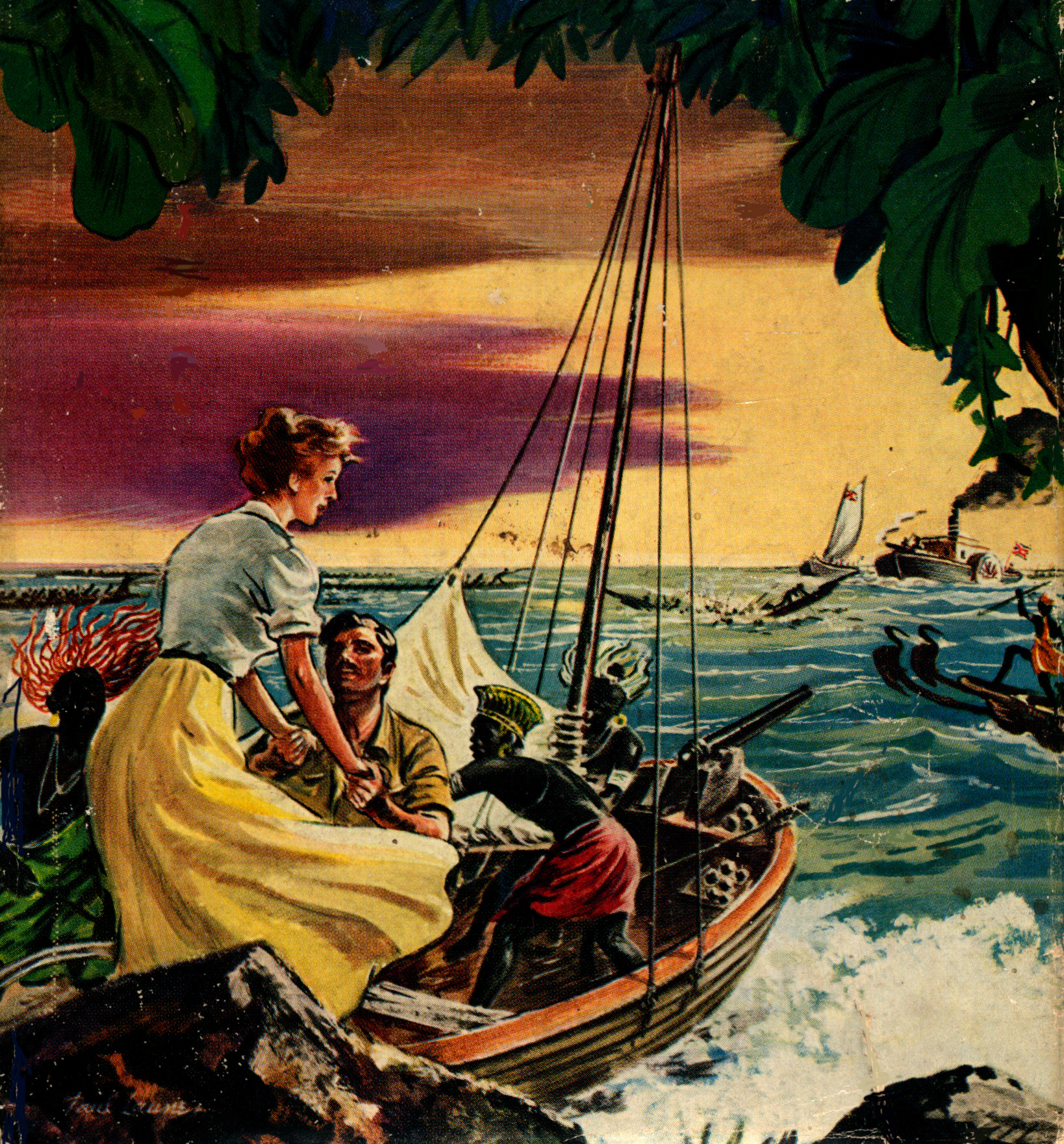
Dustjacket illustration by Paul Laune for Kiboko by Daniel P. Mannix, Lippincott, 1958.

Kiboko received mixed reviews. Negative reviews described the plot as disjointed, the characters as "wooden" and that Mannix's attempt to include his empirical knowledge of Africa bogged down the story. Positive reviews highlighted the adventure and depictions of battles. One reviewer described the battle with the British as follows: "Knowing their chances are slim, risking their fortune in ivory and their lives, Rutledge and Kitty [his abolitionist wife] rally their native forces—the bodyguard of Manyema cannibals, 500 beautiful Amazon maidens and 16,000 painted and feathered Buntorian warriors [Buntoro being the fictional name of Baganda (southern Uganda)]. The savage conflict that follows is surely one of the most spectacular ever written". Another positive review offered this assessment: "Not only is this one of the most absorbing historical novels we have read recently, but it graphically points up the ideological and temperamental variance between Americans and Englishmen on one hand, Africans and Englishmen on the other". It also praised his portrayal of the relationship between Rutledge and Kitty as "a beautiful story of love and devotion in which [their] two ideological spheres meet". The dustjacket illustration by Paul Laune (writer, painter, and illustrator) for the 1958 hardcover edition of Kiboko depicts Rutledge, Kitty and Buntoro warriors ready to confront the English flotilla led by a paddle steamer in the Lake battle.

==== Autobiographical collaborations / biographies ====
Mannix also collaborated with several notable people in writing their autobiographies, including big game hunter, J.A. Hunter; animal collector, Peter Ryhiner; and ground-breaking veterinarian, Phyllis Lose. In a long review of Phyllis Lose's biography, a reviewer for The Brattleboro Reformer noted that: "In this day of Women's Lib and ERA it is astonishing to find a book entitled "No Job for a Lady," but when Phyllis Lose decided she wanted to become a veterinarian it was indeed no job for a lady. Here is her autobiography, a sometimes humorous, sometimes sad but always entertaining and interesting account of her struggles to become one of the first women veterinarians in the country." One of her greatest achievements was to open her own equine hospital which is considered to be one of the world's finest. While she specialized in the treatment of horses and was a longtime veterinarian for the Philadelphia mounted police unit, she also treated circus animals as chronicled in the chapter, I Join the Circus. This chapter tells of her work as a veterinarian for Ringling Bros. and Barnum & Bailey Circus in which she describes the training of lions, tigers, and bears for animal acts. This chapter has strong parallels with Mannix's earlier magazine article, Big Cats Walk Alone, which had a similar topic.

An interview article of Dr. Lose for Veterinary Practice News noted that, "Her worst patient ever was a South American vulture that belonged to her horseman client Daniel Mannix [emphasis added]. He asked her to take a look at it 'while I was there,' and it pecked a chunk out of her head." She finished her rounds of other clients' barns wearing a bloody turban.

The Reader's Digest condensed version of her book was illustrated by David K. Stone. The cover shows a diminutive looking young veterinarian, dressed in white, examining the lower leg of a large powerful white horse. The scene calls to mind the challenges she faced.

Cover illustration by R.F. Kuhn (aka Bob Kuhn) for the 1953 Reader's Digest Association condensation of "Hunter", by J.A. Hunter

The tone for the J.A. Hunter autobiography, Hunter, is set in the first two paragraph which relates the horror of a rogue elephant rampaging through a village in Kenya where Hunter was working as a guide. The scene, as illustrated on the cover of the Reader's Digest condensed version, shows villagers running for their lives in front of the huge bull elephant. The illustration is a gray-scale drawing except for the red blanket worn by one of the men. "[T]hat blanket was his death warrant for the elephant followed him ... the [man] screams as the elephant caught him. The great brute put one foot on his victim and pulled him to pieces with his trunk. Then he stamped the body into the ground and went away." Hunter later explained that elephants appear to be attracted by red. The story goes on to describe how Hunter tacked down the elephant in dense cover. The elephant charged and he was barely able to shoot it just before it reached him. The book includes descriptions of many of his exploits as hunter, guide, and game warden, some of which may be disturbing.

Hunter and Mannix continued their collaboration with their 1954 book, Tales of the African Frontier, which describes the role of iconic adventurers in the colonization (sometimes exploitation) of east Africa. This book has fifteen chapters, nearly all of which are biographies of particular individuals. Some chapters were attributed to Mannix, some to Hunter, and some to both. The first chapter, a biography of Tippu Tib, was informed by Mannix's conversation with Tippu's daughter-in-law. She insisted that "Tippu was the man who really opened East Africa, not these foreign explorers who are given the credit". Tippu Tib, (Homed bin Muhammad) was called that by the Africans to imitate the sound of rapidly firing guns. He was the model for Binbin in Mannix novel, Kiboko, noted above. Other biographies follow, most informed by such interviews, some with the actual subject.

One of these of particular note was R.O. Preston of the 'Lunatic Line', so named because it was deemed lunacy to build a railroad from the coast the central lakes. "Nearly a thousand miles of track would have to be laid across deserts, through jungles, over rivers that were in flood during the rainy season, and among mountain passes inhabited by still untamed tribes". Through the determination of Preston, the line was completed, however it nearly came to an end at Tsavo due to marauding man-eating lions. Hunter was able to talk with Preston himself about the experience. In Hunter's opinion, the lions may have gotten a taste for human flesh when they scavenged bodies of dead "coolies" (Hunter's word) who were often left unburied. Mannix later proposed a similar scenario to explain the behavior of man-eating wolves that entered Paris in the 1400s during the One Hundred Years' War.

Peter Ryhiner's autobiography, The Wildest Game, also featured wilderness adventure, but Ryhiner's goal was to capture iconic animals from all around the world for captivity, not to kill them. Unlike Hunter, Ryhiner was a flamboyant character, and the book plays up his relationship with a girl named Mercia, who becomes his wife. (She proposed to him.) She is featured in many of the photographs included in the book. Another photograph shows Ryhiner in a tuxedo with a valuable white python, (which he captured in Siam) around his neck.

=== Magazine articles ===
In addition to books, Mannix wrote numerous magazine articles/short stories. A partial list in a fiction magazine database includes nearly 40 of these, some of which were written in collaboration with his wife. Many were published in Collier's and The Saturday Evening Post. In addition, he published over 60 articles in True, The Man's Magazine. Big Cats Walk Alone, was one of these. It was republished in a paperback-book collection of the best of the True stories from 1950.

==== Early articles ====
Cover art by Margorie Woodbury Smith for June 1933 issue of St. Nicholas for Boys and Girls containing an article by Daniel P. Mannix about the armadillos in his backyard zoo.

Mannix's first published work was a story about Bettas or Siamese fighting fish published in the old children's magazine, St. Nicholas in January 1931. It was captioned "A school-boy gets away with a excuse for being late to his class" i.e.: he was breaking up a fight between his fish. (His father. Captain D. Pratt Mannix, had published an article in St. Nicholas the previous year about his participation in a defensive operation against German U-boats during World War I.) He went on to write other articles for St. Nicholas about his animals in what came to be called his "Back-Yard Zoo". One of these, Two Texas Goblins in the June 1933 issue, was about two armadillos that he got from Texas. The cover art of this issue by Marjorie Woodbury Smith (a frequent illustrator of covers for St. Nicholas at that time) promoted an adventurous spirit for young people, which was exemplified by the young Daniel Mannix as he assembled his backyard zoo.

His first published magazine article for a general adult readership was Gladiators of the Gods, which appeared in the May 25, 1935, issue of The Saturday Evening Post. The article includes his observations of the newly blossoming tropical fish hobby and was beautifully illustrated by Nancy D. James. He claimed that when his English professor at the University of Pennsylvania learned that his article had been accepted for publication, "[He] gasped, 'I have been trying to sell something to the Post for 40 years. Tell me how you do it' ".

==== Hunting adventures ====
One of his most notable articles was Hunting Dragons with an Eagle, which was published in the January 18, 1941, issue of The Saturday Evening Post. It recounts Jule and Daniel Mannix's adventure hunting large iguanas with a bald eagle. They obtained the eagle while living an apartment in New York City and moved to Taxco, Mexico to train it for falconry and to hunt with it in the rural area near there. It was Jule Mannix, an experienced horseback rider, who determined that she should conduct the hunt on horseback. The article was documented with many of their photographs.

Cover of May 1958 issue of Cavalier highlighting an article within by Daniel P. Mannix titled The Spotted Hunter Who Never Misses

The larger format of magazines compared to books and greater potential to include eye-catching color illustrations added another dimension to Mannix's printed works. The article, The Spotted Hunter Who Never Misses, the cover story in the May 1958 issue of Cavalier, is an example. The article describes how Mannix hunted coyotes with his cheetah. The dramatic (and exaggerated) cover art by Frank McCarthy depicts a cheetah lunging forward on a leash held by a heroic-looking hunter. He named the cheetah Rani, the feminine form of Raja, when it was a pup but discovered it was a male when it matured. The article describes how Rani was trained, and it includes a vivid description of the hunt as well as numerous color photographs taken by himself.

A few months after the cheetah article, Mannix published another cover article, King of the Great Safari, in the August 1958, issue of Cavalier. It was subtitled, "The writer who knows him best tells the story of John Hunter the breed of white hunter that Africa will never see again". As noted above, Mannix had previously collaborated with Hunter on two books, Hunter (an autobiography), 1952, and Tales of the African Frontier, 1954. The article recounts Hunter's life starting with his youthful misadventures in Scotland which caused his parents to send him away to live with a distant relation in Kenya. He was not treated well so he ran away and took up hunting lions, earning a living by selling the skins for a pound, about $5.00 at the time. He was then hired by the Uganda Railway to protect the workers from lions and later the Kenya Game Department to kill lions, primarily those that were raiding Maasai cattle corrals. According to Mannix, "In the old days the Maasai had handled such difficulties themselves ... going stark naked with their spears and shields to fight the lions". However, the British outlawed the practice, which upset the balance of nature (if one considers the relationship between the Maasai and the lions to be part of the natural system). Consequently, the lion population had grown enormously while feeding on the cattle. Mannix goes on to describe many interesting details of Hunter's career that followed from those early experiences, as well as conversations that he had with Hunter and those who knew him that revealed his personality.

The cover illustration by Denver Laredo Gillen featured an idealized head-and-shoulder portrait of Hunter against a backdrop of Mount Kilimanjaro and the savanna, with Hunter and his guide next to a downed African buffalo. The article itself included a full page painting by Bob Kuhn, an accomplished artist whose works are a centerpiece of exhibits at the National Museum of Wildlife Art in Jackson Hole, Wyoming. The painting depicts a magnificent black-maned male lion standing over a female. They had been trailing Maasai cattle to their corral and it was Hunter's job to kill them.

Mannix's article Death in the Surf in the March 1956 issue of the old Outdoor Adventures magazine included many of his photographs of Mexican fishermen harpooning a shark. One of these was labeled "Death getting its portrait taken! The shark has attacked—and has been attacked. The range? Zero!".

==== Grace Wiley ====
His perhaps troubling article, "True Witnesses a Fatal Cobra Strike", in the November 1948 issue of True, The Man's Magazine had large color photographs of the herpetologist, Grace Wiley, taken moments before she was fatally bitten by her Indian cobra. His pictures of the cobra shows a marking on the hood shaped like the letter G. According to Mannix's story Grace Wiley had remarked, "Isn't it curious that he and I have the same initial. I call him my snake".

==== Occult ====
Other articles in True had occult or aberrant themes. His article, The Great Beast, about the occultist Aleister Crowley in the October 1956 issue featured a somewhat lurid two-page painting of a mock religious ceremony by William A. Smith. Another article in the January 1963 issue, The Strange Story of Human Wolves, included a large illustration by Bruce Bomberger (a magazine and advertising illustrator known for his depictions of the "Marlboro Man") that showed a horrified father looking into the dug-up grave of his disemboweled young daughter (the body not shown). As described by Mannix, the atrocity was one of many carried out in Paris in the late 1840s by François Bertrand, which were initially thought to have been done by a werewolf. His descriptions were based on extensive court records quoted in the article.

==== Comical ====
He also published an article titled Sex in Sawdust in the June 1958 issue of Playboy, a magazine known for its centerfolds of nude and semi-nude models (Playmates). Playboy, at the time, combined titillating content with articles of more literary or cultural merit. He based the article on his carnival experience. It featured a full-page pastel drawing by portrait artist, Fred Steffen, of a carnival sex show concessionaire (a "thickset individual who somewhat resembled a large beetle") and his scantily clad, buxom model luring customers into his tent. One of his come-ons (given in a confidential tone) was "Inside this tent I've got a group of beautiful living models that illustrate my talk on sex". According to Mannix, the models inside turned out to be guinea pigs. The well-known writer, poet, and artist, Shel Silverstein, illustrated a pictorial, Silverstein in Italy, in the same issue.

==== Bibliographical notes ====
Sometimes materials in the articles were used in subsequent works; for example: articles about the animals he kept as a young person published in St. Nicholas magazine e.g., his story about his armadillos,(in the book, The Back-Yard Zoo, 1934); more articles about his animals in St. Nicholas, Esquire, This Week, and The Saturday Evening Post (in the book, More Back-Yard Zoo, 1936); articles by The Great Zadma (pseudonym), Collier's,1944 to 1947,(in the book, Step Right Up, 1951); Hunting Dragons with an Eagle, The Saturday Evening Post, 1941, (in the book, Adventure Happy by his wife and also the subject of their film King of the Sky, 1953); The Great Beast, True, 1956 (in the book, The Beast: The Scandalous Life of Aleister Crowley, 1959); and Middle Passage with Malcolm Cowley, American Heritage, 1962 (in the book, Black Cargoes: A History of the Atlantic Slave Trade 1518–1865, 1962).

=== Interest in L. Frank Baum and the Land of Oz ===
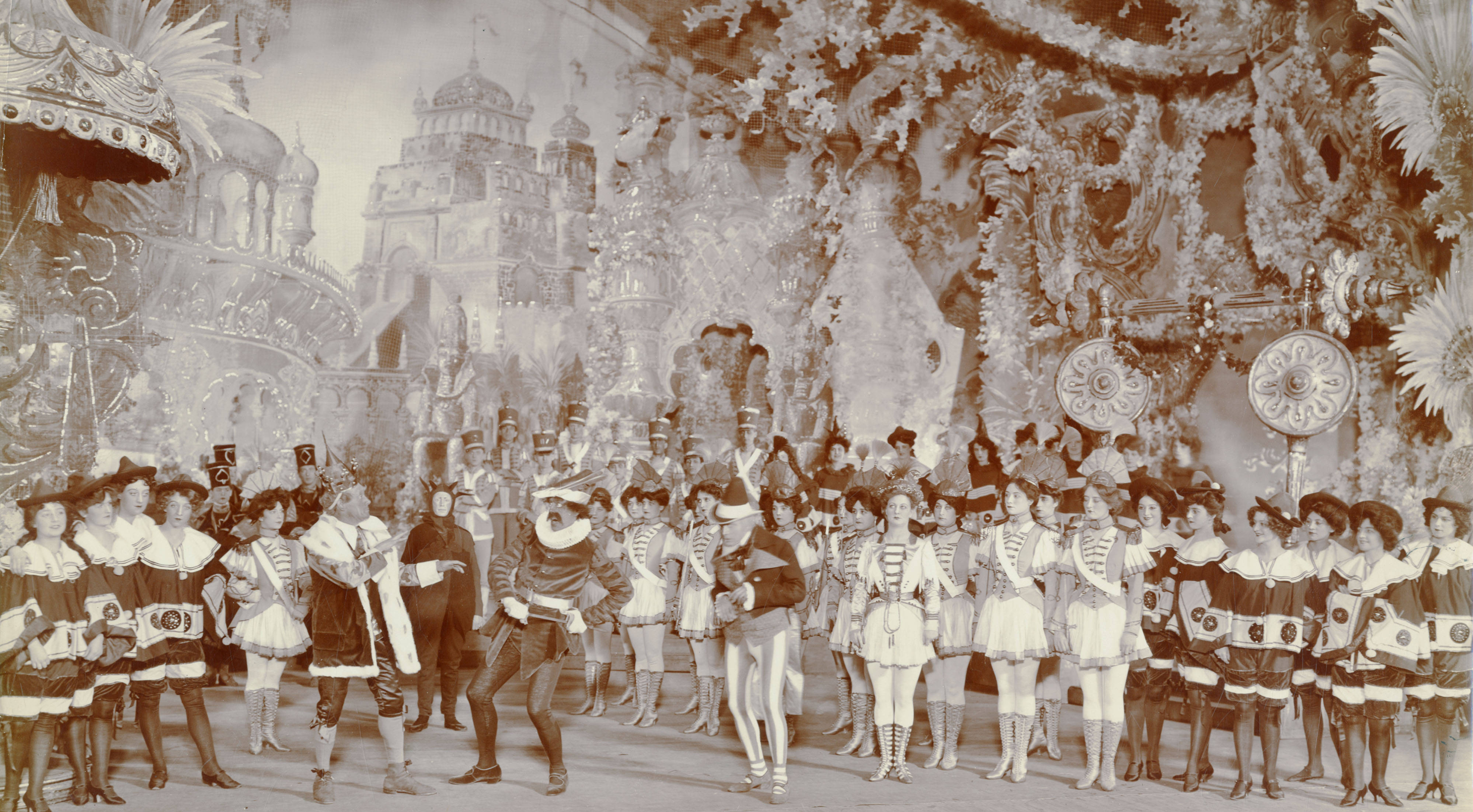
A scene depicting the Emerald City in The Wizard of Oz extravaganza. Mannix included this and many other related images in his review.

Mannix participated in the organization of the Munchkin Conventions of the International Wizard of Oz Club with Ray Powell since their inception in 1967 Conventions in 1967 and 1970 were held at his farm. The 1967 convention marked the inauguration of the Munchkins and had over 100 attendees from several U.S. states and Canada. At one of the conventions, "he delighted the younger set with a demonstration of his fire eating skills!".

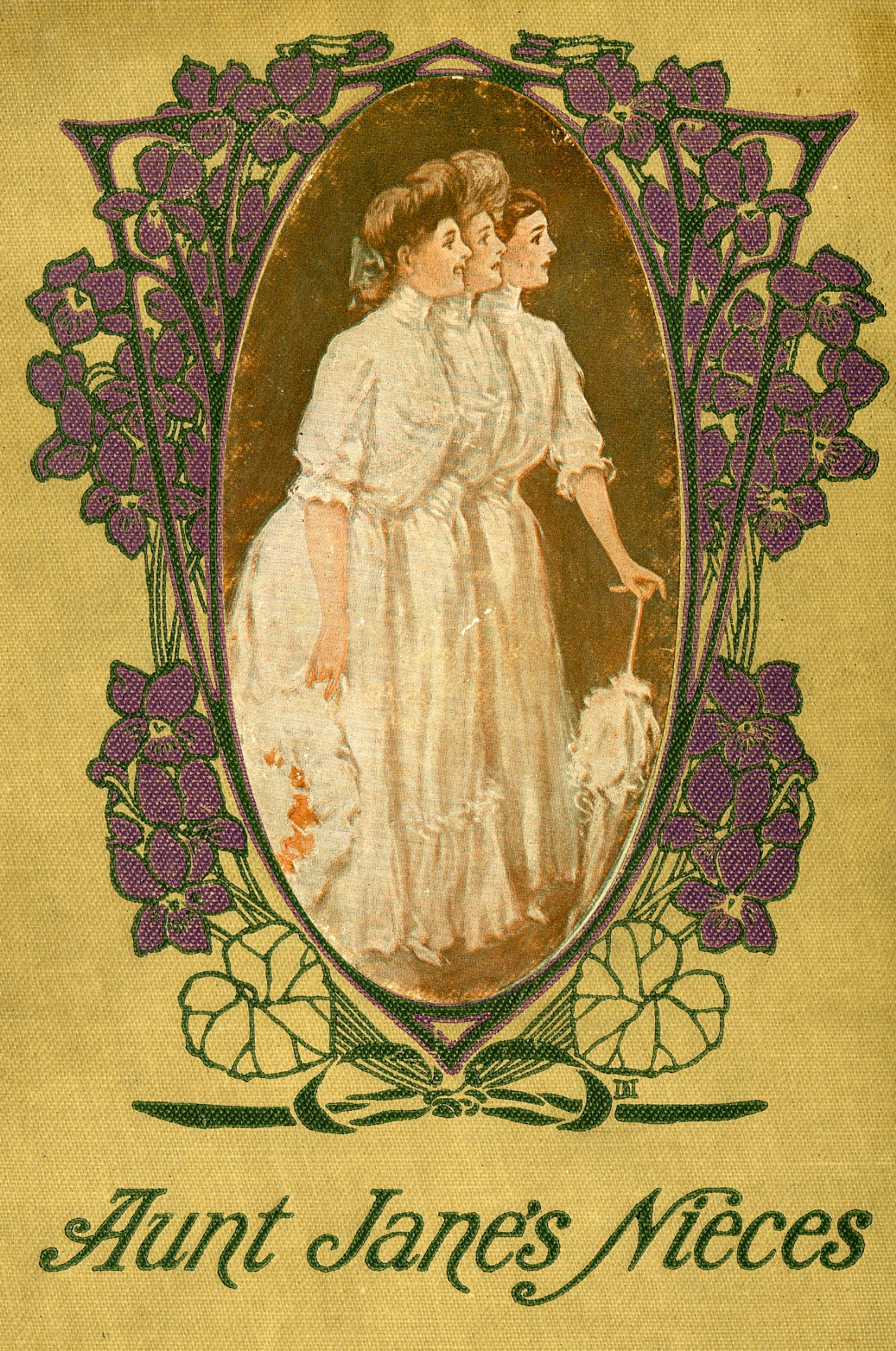
Cover illustration by Emile A. Nelson for Aunt Jane's Nieces by Edith Van Dyne [pseudonym for L. Frank Baum], Reilly & Britton Co., 1906.

Mannix began writing about Oz in 1964 with The Father of the Wizard of Oz!". a biography of L. Frank Baum (author of the Oz books) published in American Heritage magazine, after which he published nearly 20 articles in The Baum Bugle on Oz related topics. Two of his more in-depth articles were an annotated version of his book, The Road to Oz, and a review of a 1903 New York version of the musical extravaganza, The Wizard of Oz, loosely based on L. Frank Baum's book The Wonderful Wizard of Oz.

While an exhaustive critique of the Oz extravaganza is now available, Mannix's account provided a short 11-page description in a colorful style. For example, he noted that Fred R. Hamlin, the play's producer, had "virtually jacked up Baum's title and moved a new play under it". Mannix, himself a magician, took particular interest in a scene in Act III, in which Tin Woodman rescues the Scarecrow from a cage by disassembling him and passing the parts to Dorothy. Then they reassembled him and "as each piece is fitted into place, it becomes more and more animated until the Scarecrow is himself again". He explained that "This illusion is known among magicians as the Black Art effect". He then went on to describe exactly how it was done.

Mannix's 1975 novel The Secret of the Elms (noted above) contains an inside "Oz" joke. It is dedicated to Edith Van Dyne, who most readers would not know was a pseudonym for L. Frank Baum. His 1906 book, Aunt Jane's Nieces, illustrated by Emile A. Nelson, describes the adventures three young women who are invited to their dying aunt's then home so she can determine which one to leave her estate to. Mannix's book has the same premise (although in his book it is their grandmother), along with frequent references to The Wonderful Wizard of Oz. There are many parallels in the plot lines. In the end, for example, (as noted in a plot summary) none of the girls inherits Aunt Jane's estate. It goes instead to a neglected boy who has been living there. Furthermore, it turns out that their kindly uncle, not the aunt, is the one with the money and he becomes the benefactor (at least to one of the girls).

At the end of Mannix's book the protagonist has an earnest discussion with her benefactor (in his book, the grandfather) in the estate graveyard. After first asking if she can be buried there, she asks "And then will I go to the land of Oz and see Dorothy and the Scarecrow and the Tin Woodman and the Cowardly Lion?" He responds, "Of course you will. But I rather think I'll see them all before you will, dear". According to the dedication, Mannix's Munchkin collaborators, Ray and Louise Powell, suggested the idea for the book.

== Awards ==
- Dutton Animal Book Award for The Fox and the Hound, 1967
- Athenaeum of Philadelphia literary award for The Fox and the Hound, 1967
- American Academy of Arts and Letters – Literature, 1973

Other awards include: the African Safari Club of Philadelphia's gold medal, and the Wilderness Club Award.

== Literary and other influences ==
=== Step Right Up ===
Mannix's book Step Right Up (later called Memoirs of a Sword Swallower) was inspiration for Penn Jillette, magician and television presenter, to take up fire eating. His description of how he got started, which appeared in Smithsonian Magazine, includes a long quotation from the book which includes the line, "I was 19 years old, and like many men that age, I felt invincible. I wasn't, and you aren't. Remember that. Do not eat fire!"

Step Right Up was also inspiration for Betty Bloomerz, a current-generation sword swallower. She considered the book to be the discipline's "urtext".

=== Tales of the African Frontier ===
The movie Killers of Kilimanjaro (1959) was inspired by the story of the Tsavo maneaters in the 1954 book Tales of the African Frontier by J.A. Hunter and Daniel P. Mannix. According to a contemporaneous review in The New York Times, the book includes short biographies of a dozen or so mostly white pioneers (referred to by Hunter as a "Race of Giants") who were said to have tamed East Africa; in summary, "an utterly enthralling, sometimes hair-raising adventure story that brings to life again a primeval Africa that was still the heart of darkness". While the book received positive reviews in 1954, the film released approximately five years later was criticized. The New York Times called it "a compendium of jungle cliches". According to Jeffrey Richards, movies such as Killers of Kilimanjaro pushed the narrative that the British were not in East Africa to further their own ends, but instead perpetuated the myth that they were there to protect the natives from the evil Arab slavers.

The film had almost no relationship to the book other than the setting. It was a loose dramatization of the survey to determine the route of the Uganda Railway conducted in real life by Captain James Macdonald rather than the construction itself. The protagonist in the film was a dashing civilian rather than an army officer and the love interest and gun battles with a German led competitor were completely made up. Nevertheless, the film did convey a sense of the harsh conditions encountered in the effort. The book chapter focused on the tremendous engineering feat in constructing the railway from Mombasa to Lake Victoria under the leadership of construction engineer, R.O. Preston. There was nothing about that in the film. Moreover, despite Preston's critical contributions to the construction, he received no credit in the project summary by the chief engineer's son, so they tend to be overlooked.

=== Those About to Die ===
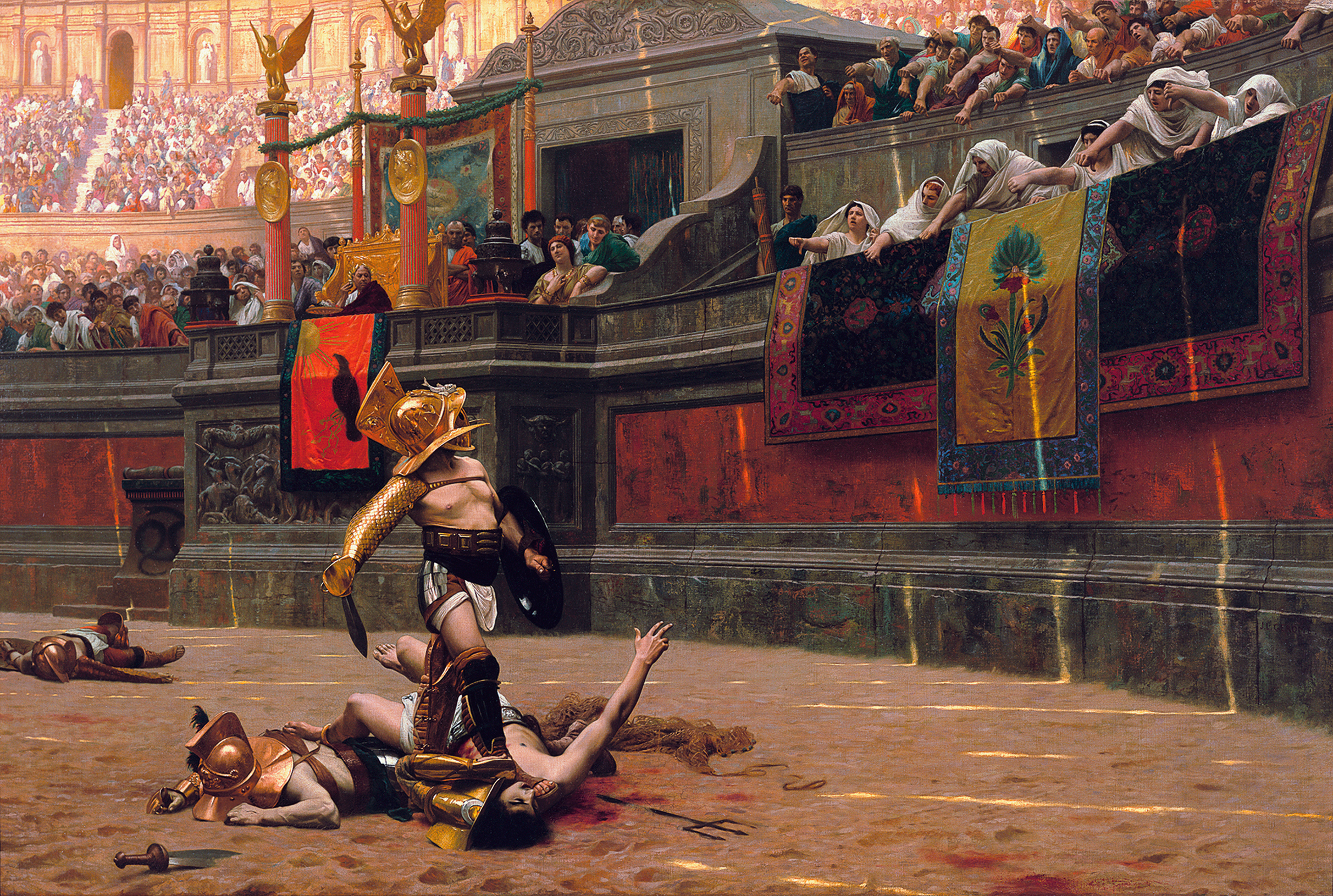
Pollice Verso (1872) by Jean-Léon Gérôme. Oil on canvas, Phoenix Art Museum. A reproduction of this painting was used a cover art for the 2001 Ballantine paperback edition Those About To Die, The Way of the Gladiator.

The initial screenplay for Gladiator (winner of five Academy Awards in 2001) by David Franzoni was inspired by Mannix's 1958 book Those About to Die. The book was then republished in 2001 as the Way of the Gladiator. In an interview Franzoni stated that "When I read the book, it's not the story of Gladiator, but what was in the book was an understanding of how to connect who and how we were to who and how they were. There was a very clear understanding that the coliseums were a sports franchise". Indeed, a contemporaneous review of the book in The Los Angeles Times in 1958 included the following comment, "The result [Mannix's vivid and detailed writing style] may disturb scholars but it gives this volume the color and feeling of the Monday morning report by a top-notch reporter of a slam-bang football game". The book and the film have almost nothing else in common. The book is a combination of descriptive accounts and historical-fiction sequences illustrating how the Roman games evolved over time into an extraordinarily expensive and cruel entertainment enterprise. The film is a dark historical drama centered on a self-indulgent, petulant emperor opposed by a heroic gladiator (former general then a slave) seeking vengeance for his murdered wife and son. In addition to the film, Mannix's book is credited as inspiration for the Peacock multi-season TV drama Those About to Die which was released in 2024.

The cover of the 2001 Ballantine paperback edition of the book included a reproduction of the painting Pollice Verso ["Thumbs Down"] (1872) by Jean-Léon Gérôme, an apparent attempt to capitalize on the popularity of the movie. It depicted a victorious gladiator standing over his prone rival and seeking a thumbs up or thumbs down from the audience. Mannix's account of this type of combat was primarily journalistic. His action sequences mainly portrayed the use of animals in the games, either to be killed by a venator or to torture martyrs (or other prisoners). Such a scene was portrayed on the cover of the 1968 British reprint published by Panther Books, which depicted a young woman about to be dismembered by bulls pulling ropes tied to her hands and feet. There were dead lions in the background perhaps killed by a venator. The illustration was extended over the front and back covers.

=== Hunting Dragons with an Eagle (magazine article) ===
The Adventures of Augie March, a National Book Award winner, by Saul Bellow, included story lines similar to those in a Mannix manuscript. In one account, author, Steve Bodio, claimed that Bellow used material from a yet unpublished manuscript describing Jule and Daniel Mannix hunting iguanas on horseback with his bald eagle, in Mexico. Consequently, Bellow was forced to pay Mannix a large sum of money. Bodio characterized chapters 14–20 of Augie March as "FULL of Mannix!". Bellow's account in The New Yorker described the situation differently. He said that he met Jule and Daniel Mannix while they were hunting. He was impressed by the eagle but not Daniel Mannix who he said was just a showman. When Mannix confronted him about his description of iguana hunting by Thea Fenchel (Augie March's girlfriend for a time), he said he added a footnote to his book. He said nothing about being forced to pay compensation.

As described in a New York Times review, Bellow fits Thea and her eagle into a larger overarching narrative. "A remarkable series of strong characters try to take him over, fit him [Augie] into their schemes. These schemes include everything from handling prize-fighters, stealing books, smuggling immigrants and selling army surplus in Europe, to organizing new CIO unions, guarding Trotsky in Mexico, training a moody eagle to hunt giant lizards and regenerating mankind by abolishing boredom". Also, the writing style of Mannix and Bellow could not be more different. Mannix is matter of fact and journalistic, while Bellow's Augie is flowery (perhaps performative). As described in the Times review: "The bravura paragraphs of philosophizing are dazzling but sometimes difficult". For example, Mannix described his first impression of his eagle in relatively simple declarative sentences. Whereas, Bellow has Augie describe his first impression of the eagle as a "Black Prince", "powerfully hansom", with "eyes that were gruesome jewels", "a manifesto of cruelty", etc. Mannix had called his eagle "Águila" the Spanish name for eagle. In a literary twist, Augie called Thea's eagle "Caligula". He decided on the name after an exchange with Mexican children. They call out "El águila!". He misunderstood and responded "Si, Caligula".

=== The Last Eagle ===
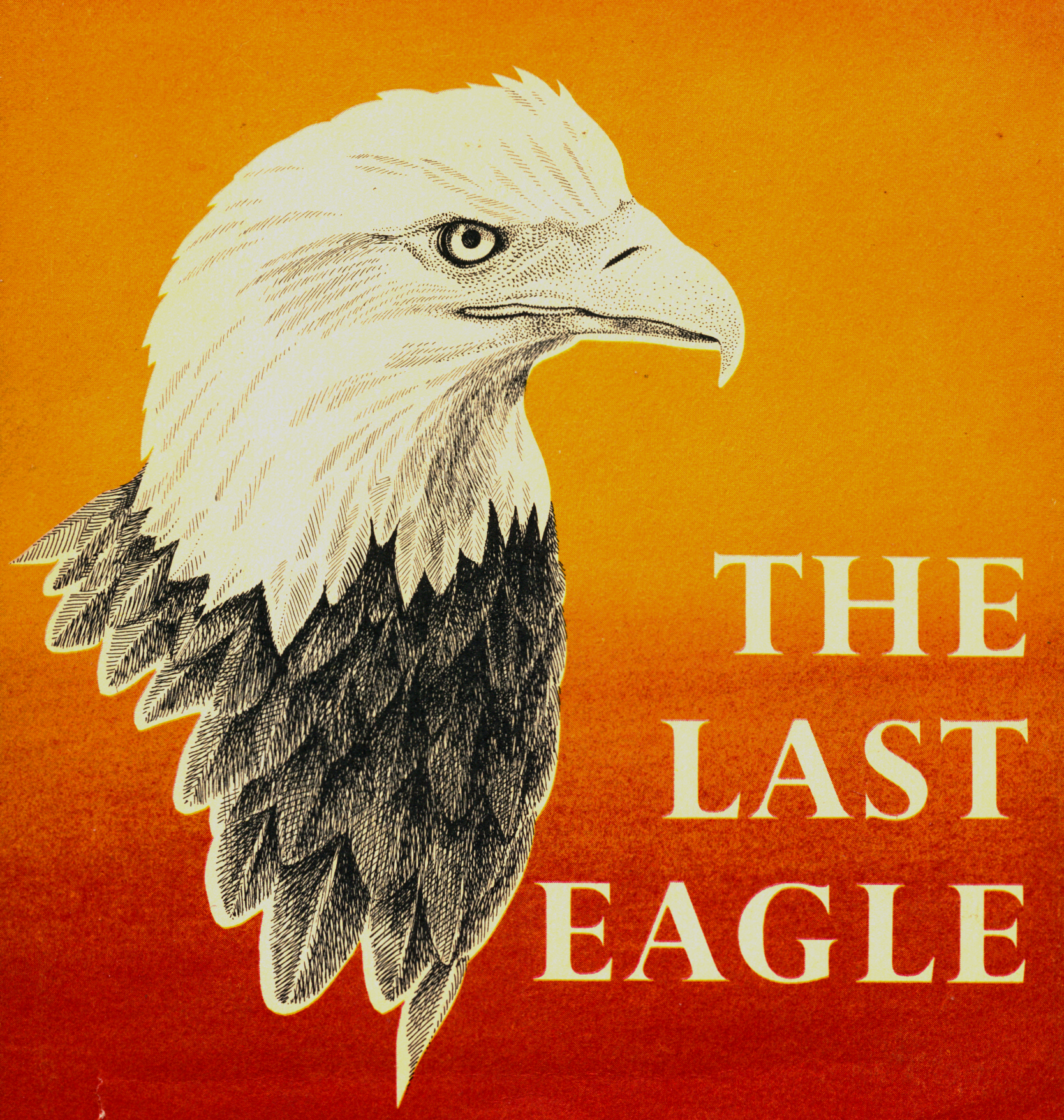
Dustjacket illustration by Russell Peterson for The Last Eagle by Daniel P. Mannix, McGraw-Hill, 1966.

Mannix noted that at the time the Hunting Dragons with an Eagle article was written there were no legal protections for bald eagles. Furthermore, according to Mannix, they were even considered a pest in some states. However, in the 1960s the eagle population began to decline precipitously in the continental United States. A variety of factors were responsible including hunting and pesticide use, particularly DDT. Consequently, he undertook the writing of his book The Last Eagle to raise awareness of the plight of the eagles and the need for action. It was his hope that a "sympathetic novel about our national bird presenting him as a personality rather than as an ornithological specimen will do more to interest the general public in preserving this uniquely American bird than would a more formal treatise." In doing so he called on his long experience with bald eagles. Even before the Mannix's Mexican adventures, they had observed and filmed eagles for three months at their nest from a blind on top of a 60-foot tower at Bombay Hook, Delaware. Then after Mexico, they continued to maintain Águila at their farm in Pennsylvania for many years. These experiences enabled him to portray the behavior of the eagles in great detail. For example, he was able to describe their playful behavior at times, which perhaps would not be expected. Reviews of the book took up the cause and noted the urgent need for conservation measures. It may be possible that the book and the reviews were helpful in that regard as hoped. In any event, the bald eagle population rebounded, following subsequent enactment of rules that restricted the use of DDT and banned the hunting of eagles.

The cover art and internal illustrations by Russell Peterson (biologist, writer, and illustrator) helped to portray the nobility and "personality" (Mannix's word) of the bald eagle in a realistic way. One reviewer specifically noted that the illustrations and high production values for the 1966 hardcover edition of The Last Eagle made it a "Joy To Own" and she titled her article that way.

=== All Creatures Great and Small ===
Mannix's description of Grace Olive Wiley's death due to a snake bite in All Creatures Great and Small was adapted for young readers in 1936 in Elson-Gray Basic Readers Book Two as Woman Without Fear. The work is still used as study material available on the internet as "A Running Brook of Horror". The name refers to Mannix's description of her cobra.

=== The Fox and the Hound ===
The Fox and the Hound was selected as a Reader's Digest Book Club selection in 1967 and an abridged version was printed in the fourth volume of the publisher's Condensed Books series. It was praised by numerous reviewers and received the Dutton Animal Book Award and Athenaeum of Philadelphia literary award. The 1981 animated feature film, The Fox and the Hound, was loosely adapted from Mannix's 1967 book. The film diverges intensely in tone and subject matter from the novel. In the film, Copper and Todd become friends at first, are sadly separated through circumstance, Copper is trained to hunt Todd, then they reconcile when Todd saves Copper and his owner from a bear attack. The movie ends on a note of melancholy with them still separated. The book's tone is instead, purely tragic with no whimsical elements. However, in both film and book, the foxes and hounds are true to type: "foxes are survivors with a sense of adventure who often take suicidal risks" and "bloodhounds are also obedient and fiercely loyal to those closest to them". However, not all of Mannix's animal protagonists are so admirable. In The Wolves of Paris, a book loosely based on real events, the protagonist is a wolf-dog cross, who leads a pack of man-eating wolves into Paris in 1450.

Some plot elements in the Disney film are also similar to those in another book and film adaptation about a fox and hound: The Ballad of the Belstone Fox (1970), written by David Rook, and published well after The Fox and the Hound and The Belstone Fox (1973), directed by James Hill. The cover art for the 40th Anniversary Edition DVD of the film includes the captions "The Original Timeless Tale of True Friendship" and "The Story that Inspired The Fox and the Hound", in reference to the 1981 Disney film. This is at odds with Disney crediting Mannix's 1967 novel, Nevertheless, David Rook's novel and James Hill's film do bear similarities in outline to the earlier Mannix novel. In both, a red fox kit is reared by a hunter after his family is killed. The fox later returns to the wild and eludes a hunter and his hounds by running the rails just before a train is due. This results in an accident that motivates the hunter to track the fox for vengeance. The ending of Rook's novel is also similar to the Disney film as the fox and hound become reconciled and save (or attempt to save, depending on the book version) the hunter's life.

In contrast, at the conclusion of Mannix's novel, the fox is tracked by the hound over a day and night until the fox, weakened by poison, dies of exhaustion. To add to the tragedy, the hound is euthanized (shot with a shotgun) by his master before he moves to an old age home. It is implied that the master is forced into this situation because men want to take his land for a housing development. The ruinous consequences of habitat destruction for animals (and humans), not touched upon in the Disney film, is central to Mannix's novel.

The realistic illustrations for Mannix's book were done by John Schoenherr, who was a well-known wildlife artist and member of the American Society of Mammologists, and the Society of Animal Artists.

=== The Wolves of Paris ===
A reviewer for the Hartford Courant commented "Informative and entertaining, and a little bit gruesome, The Wolves of Paris [Mannix's 1978 novel] is nature writing at its best, Mannix at his best". The main character is known as Courtaud (Short Tail), a wolf-dog cross who leads a pack of man-eating wolves that terrorized Paris during the Hundred Years' War. The pack's man-eating behavior was a consequence of man's own depravations. "Even back then, man's wholesale slaughter of game could force wolves to seek out domestic livestock; and the bands of warriors that scourged France left behind them as lupine comestibles the carcasses of war horses and men." An intense effort to kill Courtaud follows.

The book was illustrated by Janny Wurts while she was living in an apartment in Mannix's compound on his farm near Malvern, Pennsylvania at the time. One of her illustrations depicts the capture of Courtaud by an "African hunting leopard" [a cheetah], reminiscent of Mannix's hunting of coyotes with his cheetah. For a subsequent chapter (after Courtaud's escape) Wurts depicted another wolf being attacked by a trained golden eagle, also reminiscent of Mannix's experience. (The eagle had veered off Courtaud at the last instant). Wurts' illustrations (done with a "25-cent pen") were well received and helped to launch her career as an illustrator. After which she became a writer herself. The dedication page of her first novel, Sorcerer's Legacy includes "D.P. Mannix IV, who has been friend, advisor, and example". For the cover of her second novel, The Cycle of Fire: Stormwarden, Keeper of the Keys, Shadowfane she painted a picture of a wizard with a goshawk that was modeled on a goshawk, which came to Mannix's farm, blind in one eye. She went on to write numerous novels (20 as of 2021); in addition to cover art and interior art for even more.

=== No Job for a Lady ===
In her autobiography, No Job for a Lady ("as told to Daniel P. Mannix"), Dr. Phyllis Lose commented derogatorily about some racehorse owners who were often more concerned with money than the wellbeing of their horses. "One of the tragedies of working with Thoroughbreds—and to anyone fond of horses it is a real tragedy—is that they are often so valuable that monetary considerations wipe out all other factors ... Under these circumstances there is no real affection between master and mount; it is all a grim business of profit." Her book was reprinted in the 1980 (#5) volume of Reader's Digest Condensed Books, which were widely read at the time. Given that wide audience, perhaps it raised awareness of the issue. Nevertheless, maltreatment of racehorses has continued to be a concern until recent times.

== Personal life ==
Mannix and his wife and sometime co-author Jule Junker Mannix travelled around the world and raised exotic animals. Jule Mannix wrote the book Married to Adventure in 1954 as an autobiographical account of her adventurous life with Mannix. The couple had a son, Daniel Pratt Mannix V (1947–2022), and a daughter, Julie Mannix (c.1945) von Zerneck (who married Frank von Zerneck). From 1950 onward, Daniel and Jule Mannix lived in the same house in East Whiteland, near Malvern, Pennsylvania. Jule Mannix died May 25, 1977. Mannix died on January 29, 1997, at the age of 85, and was survived by his son and daughter, and four grandchildren (including Danielle von Zerneck and Kathy Hatfield).

Mannix's daughter, Julie Mannix von Zerneck was a television actress prior to her marriage. She published a book, Secret Storms A Mother and Daughter, Lost then Found, in 2013 with her daughter Kathy Hatfield who had been given up for adoption at birth. In alternating sections throughout the text, each author tells the touching story of how they were reunited after overcoming many obstacles. In her part, Julie von Zerneck says that she was an unwed mother at the time and that her parents forced her to give up her baby for adoption.

Mannix's son, Daniel Prat Mannix V, Esq., learned magic, sword swallowing, and fire eating from his father and like him traveled with a circus. As a lawyer he worked to establish conservation easements.

== Bibliography ==
- The Back-Yard Zoo, Coward-McCann, 1934; eNetPress 2014
- More Back-Yard Zoo, Coward-McCann, 1936; eNetPress 2014
- Step Right Up!, Harper & Bros., 1951; reprinted as Memoirs of a Sword Swallower, Ballantine, 1964; reprinted again in 1992 by Brainiac Books as Memoirs of a Sword Swallower with a new introduction by Herschell Gordon Lewis; eNetPress 2015
- Tales of the African Frontier (with J.A. Hunter), Harper & Bros., 1954; reprinted Safari Press, 2000; in Britain: African Bush Adventures, Hamish Hamilton, 1954
- The Wildest Game, by Peter Ryhiner as told to Daniel P. Mannix, J.B. Lippincott, 1958; eNetPress 2015; A shortened version of part of this book, My Beauty and My Beasts, in The Saturday Evening Post, 1958.
- Kiboko, Lippincott, 1958 (dustcover illustration by Paul Laune); in Britain: Cassell, 1959 and Harborough, 1960; eNetPress 2014
- Those About to Die, Ballantine, 1958; reprinted as The Way of the Gladiator, 2001; in Britain: Panther Books 1968; eNetPress, 2014
- The Hellfire Club, Ballantine, 1959; eNetPress 2015
- The Beast: The Scandalous Life of Aleister Crowley, Ballantine, 1959
- Black Cargoes: A History of the Atlantic Slave Trade 1518–1865 (with Malcolm Cowley), Viking Press, 1962; Britain: Longmans, 1963; softcover, Penguin Books, 1977; eNetPress 2014
- All Creatures Great and Small, McGraw-Hill, 1963; republished ebook, The Autobiography of Daniel Mannix, eNet Press 2014
- The History of Torture, Dell, 1964 (paperback); Hippocrene Books, 1986; eNetPress 2014
- The Outcasts, E.P. Dutton, 1965 (illustrated by Leonard Shortall); eNetPress 2013
- The Last Eagle, McGraw-Hill, 1966 (illustrated by Russell Peterson); in Britain: Longmans, 1967; shortened version, The Way of the Eagle, in Reader's Digest Condensed Books Vol. 64 Winter, 1966; eNetPress 2013
- A Sporting Chance: Unusual Methods of Hunting, E.P. Dutton, 1967
- The Fox and the Hound, E.P. Dutton, 1967 (illustrated by John Schoenherr); shortened version in Reader's Digest Condensed Books Vol. 71 Autumn, 1967; eNetPress 2013
- The Killers, E.P. Dutton, 1968 (illustrated by George Ford); eNetPress 2014
- Troubled Waters: The Story of a Fish, a Stream and a Pond (illustrated by Patricia Collins), E.P. Dutton, 1969; eNetPress 2014
- The Healer, Reader's Digest Press, distributed by E.P. Dutton, 1971 (dustjacket illustration by David K. Stone); eNetPress 2014
- Drifter, Reader's Digest Press, distributed by E.P. Dutton, 1974 (dustjacket illustration by David K. Stone); eNetPress 2014
- The Secret of the Elms, Reader's Digest Press, distributed by Crowell, 1975; eNetPress 2014
- We Who Are Not As Others, Pocket Books 1976; republished with photographs as Freaks: We Who Are Not As Others Re/Search Publications, 1990; eNetPress 2014
- No Job for a Lady: The Autobiography of M. Phyllis Lose, VMD, by M. Phyllis Lose as told to Daniel P. Mannix, Macmillan, 1979; shortened version in Reader's Digest Condensed Books Vol. 33 #5, 1980 (illustrated by David K. Stone); Ballantine (paperback) 1982 &1983
- The Wolves of Paris (dustjacket illustration by David K. Stone, internal drawings by Janny Wurts), E.P. Dutton (hardcover) 1978; Avon (paperback), 1979, 1983; eNetPress 2014
- The Old Navy: The Glorious Heritage of the U.S. Navy, Recounted through the Journals of an American Patriot by Rear Admiral Daniel P. Mannix, 3rd, as edited by Daniel P. Mannix 4th, Macmillan, 1983; eNetPress 2014
- Hunter, by J.A. Hunter, Hamish Hamilton, 1952 (Mannix helped Hunter write this book by "arranging, cutting and supplementing Hunter's notes" and putting it into final shape for publication); shortened version in Reader's Digest Condensed Books (illustrated by R.F. Kuhn), Winter 1953
- Happy Adventure, book by Jule Mannix (Mannix's wife), Simon & Schuster, USA, 1954; also as Married to Adventure, Great Britain, Hamish Hamilton, 1954; abridged as a paperback, Eagle in the Bathtub, Ballantine Books, 1959

This list does not include translations into other languages. Also, as of March 2024, eBook editions of Mannix's books published by eNet Press, Inc. are no longer available for purchase.

== Filmography ==
- Eagle Versus Dragon, Universal Studios, 1944 (two reel featurette) (Jule and Daniel Mannix, main subjects and narrators)
- Boy and the Eagle, RKO Pictures, 1949 (short) (original story, screen play)
- King of the Sky, Universal Studios, 1953 (documentary short – clipped from Eagle Versus Dragon) (writer, actor, director, producer, bird trainer)
- Universal Color Parade: Parrot Jungle, Universal Studios, 1958 (short) (writer, director, producer, photographer, bird trainer)
- Killers of Kilimanjaro, British: Warwick Films 1959 (book African Bush Adventures)
- Shadow of Fear, Walt Disney Productions, 1979 (book The Healer)
- The Fox and the Hound, Walt Disney Productions, 1981 (book The Fox and the Hound)
