= Leo Hershfield =

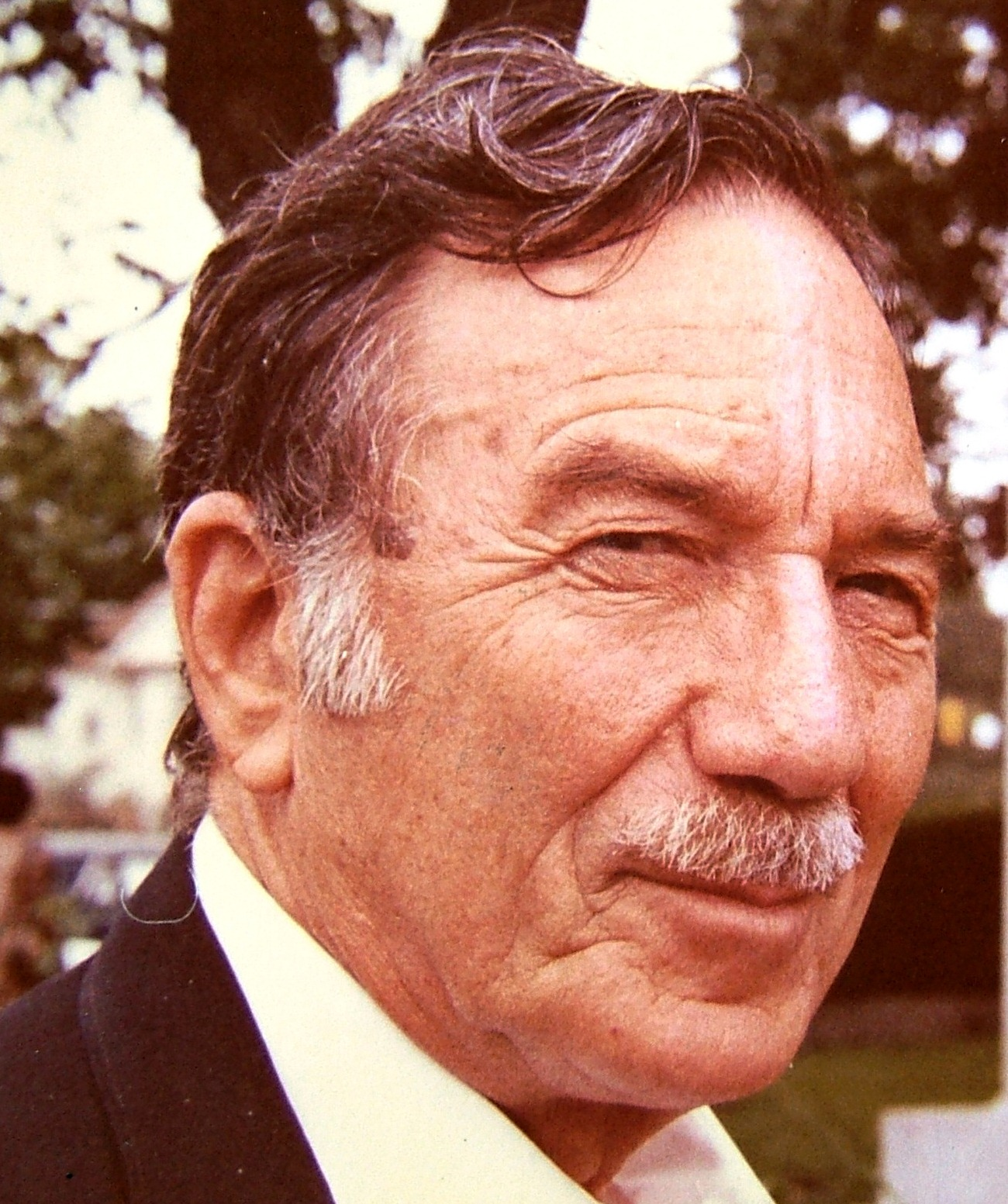
Leo Hershfield in 1979

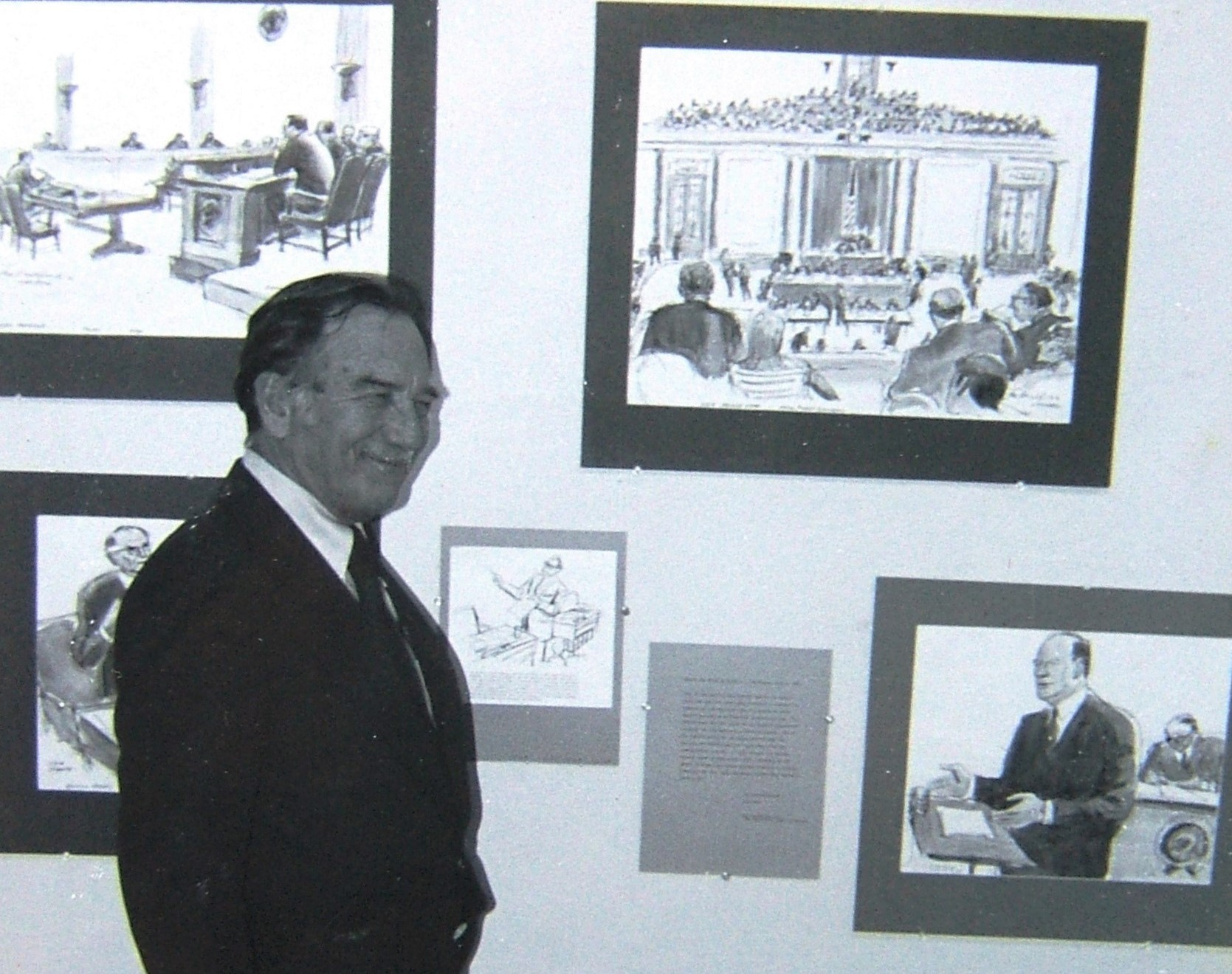
Leo Hershfield and his NBC trial watercolors

Leo Hershfield (1904–1979) was a prominent American illustrator, cartoonist and courtroom artist for NBC News. NBC referred to him as the "Dean of Courtroom Artists" since he was the first modern artist to sketch trials for TV news in the 1950s and covered 147 trials for NBC until when he died in the late 1970s.

== Biography ==
Hershfield was born in Knoxville, Tennessee, one of five children of immigrants Isadore Abraham Hershfield and Ida Alshanetsky from Kiev, Ukraine. While growing up in Chattanooga, TN, he taught himself to draw. In 1922, as its art director, he illustrated virtually the entire "Dynamo", the Chattanooga High School annual the year he graduated.

He left his family to move alone to New York City in the early 1920s, where he studied art at the National Academy of Design and joined the Art Students League. Initially, he supported himself as an employee in the "morgue", or clippings library of the New York World and worked his way up to staff artist. In 1925, he worked his way to Europe twice on a freighter to hone his drawing and watercolor styles.

In 1929, he began writing articles and drawing cartoons and caricatures of famous people appearing in the news for the New York Times. These appeared in the political and theater pages as well as their Sunday Magazine. Since the New York Times and the Chattanooga Times were both owned by Chattanoogan Adolph Ochs, Leo was given the opportunity to work simultaneously on the staff of the Chattanooga Times where he interviewed, wrote and illustrated a column entitled "Chattanoogans in Gotham".

In 1933, he married Mary Emma Hurst of New Bern, North Carolina. She had moved to New York to become a fashion model and was a chorus line member of the "Roxyettes", the forerunner of "the Rockettes" performing at the then-Roxy Theater before the show moved to Rockefeller Center.

In 1941, Hershfield illustrated his first book for humorist H. Allen Smith titled Lost in the Horse Latitudes. Over the next 38 years, he would illustrate the covers and interiors of almost 60 books, including more for H. Allen Smith as well as Vincent Price, Groucho Marx and Richard Armour.

In 1942, they moved to Alexandria, Virginia where Leo took the wartime job of Art Director for the Office of War Information in Washington, DC. When the war ended, he became a full-time freelancer, illustrating publications such as Reader's Digest, The Saturday Evening Post (where he illustrated their "Letters to the Editor" column for 17 years) and Kiplinger's Changing Times, where he contributed art to 390 consecutive issues. He also worked with advertising agencies like Ketchum, MacLeod & Grove illustrating advertisements for their clients. During this time, he also became the "artist/correspondent" for the controversial PM.

He created vivid political cartoons on every monthly cover of The Democratic Digest, the publication of the Democratic National Committee from 1954 to 1961.

Hershfield practiced his creativity in multiple media including pencil, pen and ink, watercolor, block printing, wood carving, metal sculpture and photography. He even designed and built children's toys and wrote and illustrated a children's book.

== Courtroom illustration ==
In 1954, Hershfield's sketches of Senator Joseph McCarthy accompanied NBC News' coverage of the Army-McCarthy Censure Hearings. Thereafter, he drew courtroom proceedings for NBC at major trials around the country, including the Chicago Seven, the Harrisburg Seven, Jack Ruby, James Earl Ray, Clay Shaw, Arthur Bremer, Benjamin Spock, the Gainesville Eight, Billie Sol Estes and most famously, the court martial of Lt. William Calley convicted in the My Lai Massacre trial. For 25 years, Hershfield's trial watercolors were presented by news reporters like John Cameron Swayze, David Brinkley, Chet Huntley and John Chancellor.

The age of courtroom art in the U.S. changed when, in the late 1970s, the Florida Supreme Court ruled that cameras could be allowed back into the courtroom. After moving to Bradenton, FL in 1958, with his wife and two sons, Hershfield continued to illustrate books and articles for newspapers like the St. Petersburg Times, Tampa Tribune, Sarasota Herald Tribune and the Bradenton Herald. He spent his spare time sailing the Manatee River and documenting Florida through watercolors. He was an ardent environmentalist, illustrating articles and creating humorous cartoons in newspapers and magazines in an attempt to save Florida's wetlands from industrial development.

WEDU, the local Florida PBS affiliate, interviewed Hershfield and aired a documentary about his career shortly before his death in 1979. In 1980, Washington's Corcoran Gallery held a retrospective exhibition of Hershfield's quarter century of courtroom illustration.
