= Nicola Edgington =

British double murderer

- Born: 9 September 1980 (age 46)
- Children: 2
- Convictions: Manslaughter, attempted murder, murder
- Penalty: Life imprisonment with a minimum of 37 years

Details
- Victims: 3
- Killed: 2
- Weapon: Knife

Nicola Edgington (born 9 September 1980) is a British double killer who also attempted to murder a third person. Having killed her mother in 2005, she attacked two strangers in the street in Bexleyheath in 2011, killing one. She was convicted of manslaughter due to diminished responsibility, attempted murder and murder.

== Early history ==
Edgington has a younger brother and a younger sister and attended Sackville School. Edgington told police that she was abused by her father when younger. She had stays in care homes at times. She worked as a hairdresser, shop assistant and saleswoman. At age 17 she miscarried twins after being punched in the abdomen by a violent boyfriend. At 19 she was pregnant again, by a drug-dealer boyfriend, and gave birth to a son three months prematurely. Edgington's mother, Marion, helped her care for the baby until giving the boy to foster care. Edgington married a Jamaican man, who is the father of her younger son. The sons were taken into care and then to Jamaica by her former husband.

== Killing of mother ==
On 4 November 2005 Edgington stabbed her 60-year-old mother, Marion, nine times in Forest Row, East Sussex, for which she was convicted of manslaughter due to diminished responsibility (based on diagnoses of schizophrenia and emotionally unstable personality traits) at Lewes Crown Court on 23 October 2006. She was detained indefinitely under the Mental Health Act 1983 and, following treatment and psychiatric evaluation, was released conditionally in September 2009, moving into a Greenwich flat.

== Killing and attempted killing of strangers ==
=== Build-up ===
In September 2011, Edgington sent a message via Facebook to her brother saying she was not getting the help she needed, missed her mother, and had experienced a miscarriage. She left her phone number and asked him not to tell their father, Harry, that she had made contact. Her brother replied that she killed their mother and he found the body, that the miscarriage was good news, and that she should kill herself by cutting her wrists.

Edgington sought help from the Universal Church of the Kingdom of God prior to the attacks, as she had prior to the killing of her mother, which may have disturbed her further.

On 6, 7 and 9 October, Edgington contacted police several times by phone and once in person, reporting that individuals were making death threats against her (naming one individual), and later that two cocaine users were refusing to leave her flat and may have stolen from her. Despite initially being graded as serious and requiring police attendance, no police were dispatched to investigate.

On the morning of 10 October 2011, Edgington pleaded numerous times with police and local mental health services to physically detain her under their legal powers as she felt she was having another psychotic breakdown, saying she had killed someone before and that the more scared she became the more dangerous she could be. Although taken to Queen Elizabeth Hospital, she was left there by the police prior to being securely admitted, and the psychiatric staff decided they were only going to admit her on a voluntary basis despite her risk profile and secure care plan being in her psychiatric file.

=== Attacks ===
Later in the morning of 10 October 2011, while waiting for staff to change shift and admit her, Edgington left the hospital through a door that should have been locked, took two buses and stabbed two strangers in the street in separate attacks in Bexleyheath. She bought a knife from Asda with which she tried to kill 22-year-old Kerry Clark, who survived, and a member of the public took the knife from her. Edgington subsequently stole a knife from a butcher's shop then stabbed and nearly decapitated 58-year-old Sally Hodkin, who died of her injuries within minutes. Edgington was arrested shortly afterwards at a nearby tile shop.

=== Judgement ===
According to psychiatrists, Edgington was having paranoid delusions and hallucinations, with a religious subtext. She believed a 100-eyed monster was guarding the throne of God against enemies and saw shops looking as if a nuclear holocaust had taken place; she believed Jesus had come back to save everyone's souls except hers, which she couldn't understand as she loved God. She also felt she was in a computer simulation and had various bizarre beliefs relating to famous figures and films.

On 7 February 2013 at the Old Bailey Edgington was convicted by a jury of the attempted murder of Clark and of the murder of Hodkin. Judge Brian Barker jailed her for life on 4 March 2013, with a minimum tariff of 37 years. Barker wrote that despite Edgington's firm long-standing diagnosis of schizophrenia and probable psychosis around the time of the attacks, he believed the overriding factor was borderline personality disorder (known as "emotionally unstable personality disorder, borderline type" in the UK) with rational ability. He referred to a recent medical report indicating no need for hospital treatment for Edgington. Despite Edgington having sought several times to have herself detained by the police or medical services prior to her actions, Barker stated that the killing was premeditated in a way that showed a "consistent and calculated course of criminal conduct". Barker included the random and unprovoked nature of the attacks as aggravating factors indicating more guilt, while disregarding the mitigating factor of mental disability since the psychiatric authorities disagreed about it.
