= Craig Benjamin =

Australian-American historian

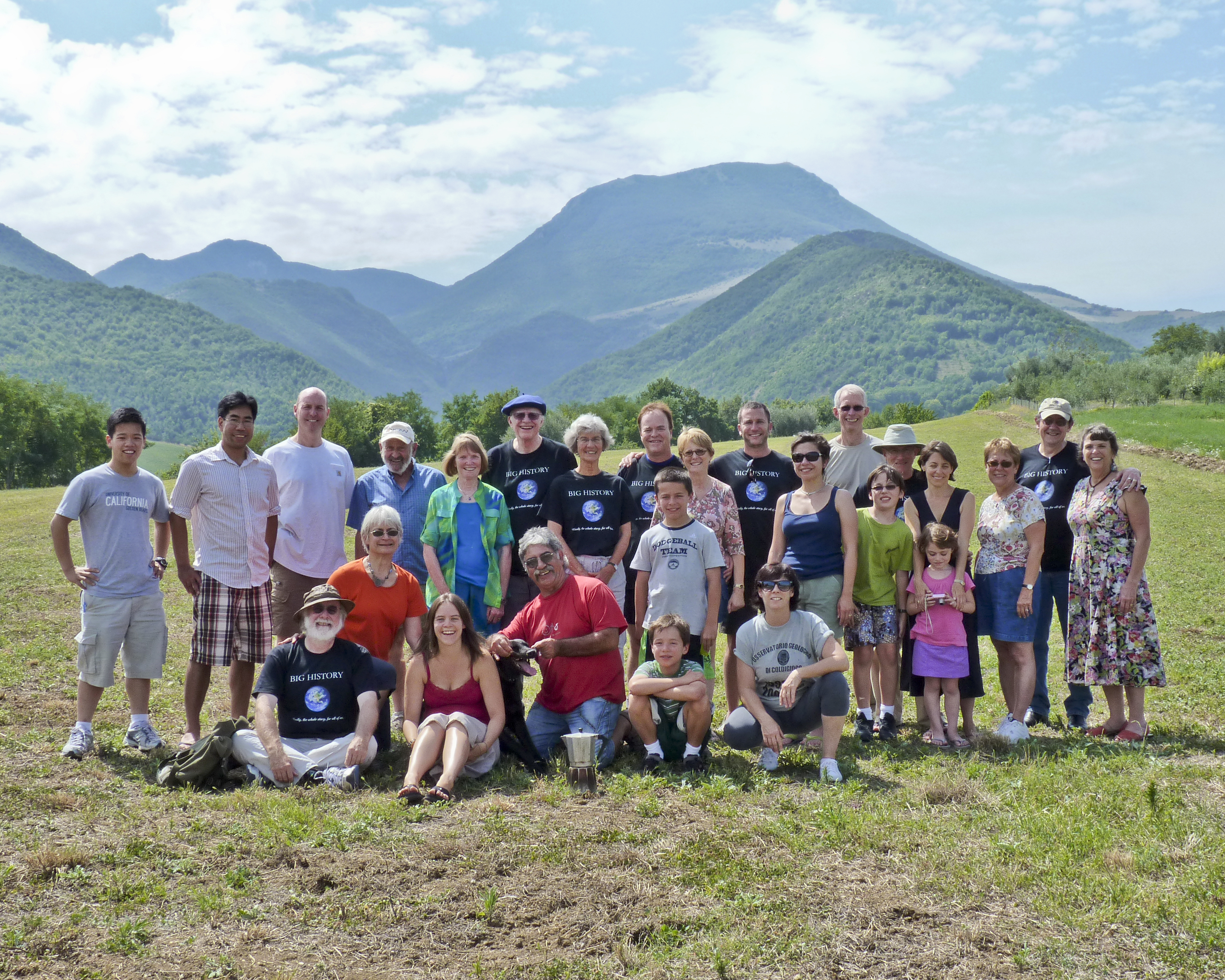
- Craig Benjamin, the eighth man from the left, attending the formation of the International Big History Association in Coldigioco, Italy on 20 August 2010
- Education: Macquarie University (PhD, 2003)
- Scientific career
- Fields: History
- Workplaces: Grand Valley State University
- Thesis: The Yuezhi: Origin, Migration and the Conquest of Northern Bactria (2003)

Craig G. Benjamin is an Australian-American historian who is professor of history in the Frederik J. Meijer Honors College at Grand Valley State University, where he teaches East Asian civilization, Big History, ancient Central Asian history, and world history historiography. In 2014 and 2015 he served as president of the World History Association.

== Biography ==
Benjamin grew up in Brisbane, Australia. Benjamin dropped out of college at the age of 19, spending the next 25 years as a professional musician and jazz educator. He pursued his undergraduate education at The Australian National University in Canberra and Macquarie University in Sydney, and gained his PhD in ancient history from Macquarie University in 2003 with his dissertation The Yuezhi: Origin, Migration and the Conquest of Northern Bactria.

Having emigrated to the United States after receiving his PhD, Benjamin has since become professor of history in the Frederik J. Meijer Honors College at Grand Valley State University (GVSU) in Allendale, Michigan. He teaches East Asian civilization, Big History, ancient Central Asian history, and world history historiography.

Benjamin has written about the ancient history of Central Asia, Big History and world history. He has recorded lectures for the History Channel and the Discovery Channel. Benjamin has recorded three courses for the Teaching Company's Great Courses series: Foundations of Eastern Civilization, The Big History of Civilizations, and The Mongol Empire. Together with David Christian and Cynthia Brown, he is the author of the first Big History textbook Big History: Between Nothing and Everything, which was published by McGraw-Hill in August 2014.

== Bibliography ==
=== Books ===
- Worlds of the Silk Roads: Ancient and Modern, Christian, D., and Benjamin, C., eds. (Turnhout, Belgium: Brepols Silk Roads Studies Series vol. II, 1998)
- Realms of the Silk Roads: Ancient and Modern, Christian, D., and Benjamin. C., eds. (Turnhout, Belgium: Brepols Silk Roads Studies Series vol. IV, 2000)
- Walls and Frontiers in Inner Asian History, Benjamin, C., and Lieu, S., eds. (Turnhout, Belgium: Brepols Silk Roads Studies Series vol. VI, 2002)
- The Yuezhi: Origin, Migration and the Conquest of Northern Bactria, Benjamin, C. (Turnhout, Belgium: Brepols Silk Roads Studies Series vol. XIV, 2007)
- Between Nothing and Everything: Big History, Christian, D., Brown, C., and Benjamin, C. (New York: McGraw-Hill, 2014)
- Cambridge History of the World Vol. 4: A World with States, Empires, and Networks, 1200 BCE-900 CE, Benjamin, C., ed. Series editor: Weisner-Hanks, M. (Cambridge: Cambridge University Press, 2015)
- The First Silk Roads Era: Empires and the Ancient World 50 BCE-250CE, Benjamin, C. (Cambridge: Cambridge University Press, 2018)
- The Routledge Handbook of Big History, Benjamin, C., E. Quaedackers and D. Baker ends. (London: Routledge, forthcoming 2019)
