= North Cestrian School =

Location
- Dunham Road; Altrincham, Greater Manchester, WA14 4AJ; England; 53.38824°N 2.35593°W

Information
- Type: Free secondary school
- Motto: "Delapsus resurgam" (When I fall I shall arise)
- Established: 1951
- Founder: Walter Hamblin
- Local authority: Trafford
- Department for Education URN: 143104 Tables
- Headmaster: L. R. Bergin
- Gender: Coeducational
- Age: 11 to 16
- Enrolment: 800~
- Colours: Blue, gold
- Website: http://www.northcestrian.co.uk/

North Cestrian School, formerly North Cestrian Grammar School, is a free school in Altrincham, Greater Manchester, England, for pupils aged between 11 and 18. North Cestrian is part of the Hamblin Educational Trust.

== History ==
The school was opened in 1951 by Walter Hamblin, formerly headmaster of Altrincham Grammar School for Boys, with 26 pupils. In 2004, the library was named after him.

The school was originally to be named North Cheshire Grammar School, but this was not permitted by the county education authorities as the school was not government-owned. Hamblin therefore replaced "Cheshire" with its Latinised form "Cestrian"; this maintained the same "NCGS" initials already in place on some school equipment.

The school was originally an all-boys school but in September, 2005 admitted its first girls. In 2008, it became fully co-educational.

== Staff ==
In 2008, teacher David Bradley was awarded an MBE in the Queen's New Year Honours List for services to young people. Bradley retired in 2013 after an investigation into sexual misconduct recommended he be issued with a prohibition order.

== Notable former pupils ==
- Devante Cole: English footballer
- Ian Crawford: astrobiologist
- Francis French: author and space historian
- Ezekiel Fryers: English footballer
- Kevin Godley: musician with 10cc; their song "I Wanna Rule The World", from the 1976 How Dare You! album and co-written by Godley, prominently features the school motto
- Kenji Gorré: Dutch footballer
- Gerald Shamash, Baron Shamash: lawyer and life peer
- Nicholas (Nicky) Slater: ice dancer
- Fred Talbot: weather presenter
