= Lance Price =

British journalist (born 1958)

- Born: 3 September 1958 (age 68); Swanley, Kent
- Education: Hertford College, Oxford
- Occupations: Journalist, Director of Communications
- Employer(s): BBC, Labour Party
- Political party: Labour Party
- Spouse: James Proctor

Lance Price (born 3 September 1958) is Chief of Staff to Kim Leadbeater, MP for Batley and Spen in the UK. He returned to active politics to help run her by-election campaign, having worked with her at the Jo Cox Foundation since the murder of her sister, who was MP for the constituency from 2015 to 2016. He is also a writer, broadcaster and political commentator. He was a journalist for the BBC from 1981 to 1998, then became special adviser to Prime Minister Tony Blair, eventually assuming the role of Director of Communications for the Labour Party, coordinating the Labour Party election campaign of 2001. He has published five books, and appears regularly on Sky News and the BBC. Price's fourth book, The Modi Effect, which details the rise of the Indian Prime Minister Narendra Modi, was published by Hodder & Stoughton in 2015.

== Education ==
Price was born in Swanley, Kent and educated at Blackwell Primary School and Sackville Comprehensive School. He received a First Class degree in Philosophy, Politics and Economics at Hertford College, Oxford: here, his early interest for media and journalism was evident in his involvement with the student newspaper, Cherwell. Whilst studying, Price became involved with the Birmingham Evening Mail and maintained an active membership of the Oxford Labour Club.

== BBC journalist ==
Price's involvement with the media continued after university, when he joined the BBC as a News Trainee, working there continuously from 1980 to 1998, taking a minor gap to travel from 1992 to 1993. His career at the BBC touched on many topical issues of the time, covering the Northern Ireland Troubles for three years, then becoming a national radio and television reporter, Defence Correspondent, and finally a Political Correspondent based at Westminster. As political correspondent and beyond, he interviewed every serving prime minister from James Callaghan to Tony Blair, and was the only journalist in Downing Street when the resignation of Margaret Thatcher was announced.

Whilst he was a Defence Correspondent, Price travelled on the first ever non-stop RAF flight from the UK to the Falkland Islands. His other work with the BBC involved presenting programmes on BBC Radio 5 Live, the BBC News Channel and fronting BBC Breakfast News after the Welsh devolution referendum.

== Labour Party ==
After seventeen years as a BBC journalist, he joined Tony Blair's staff at 10 Downing Street in 1998, where he was deputy to the Communications Director, Alastair Campbell. He was promoted to the Labour Party's Director of Communications from 2000 until the general election of 2001, playing a significant role in overseeing the party's victorious campaign.

Price was the first person to coin the phrase 'the nasty party' to describe the Conservative Party during his time with Labour. He came up with the phrase while ghost-writing a statement by Tory defector, Ivan Massow, who was joining the party.

== Author ==
Price was the co-author and principal photographer for the Berlitz Guide to Iceland, published in 2003, and he maintains an active interest in travel and photography.

Upon leaving the Labour Party, Price published the first insider account of Tony Blair's first term as prime minister, from 1997 to 2001. The Spin Doctor's Diary was published in September 2005 by Hodder & Stoughton. Price appeared before the House of Commons Public Administration Committee to answer questions on the reasons for publishing the book; the Committee went on to recommend a new system of oversight for political diaries.

Price's second book was the satirical novel Time and Fate, published in October 2005. This was a "take on what life was like for a family at the top of British politics".

In 2010, he published Where the Power Lies, analysing the relationship between past governments and the media. The book was published before the phone-hacking scandal of 2010, and argued that successive British governments had been too close to powerful media interests, including Rupert Murdoch's News Corporation. Price called for greater transparency about relationships between journalists and politicians.

On 15 January 2015, Hodder & Stoughton announced Price's fourth book, The Modi Effect, an account of Indian Prime Minister Narendra Modi's successful election campaign in 2014. It was described as the "story of Modi's rise to power", which argued that "message-management and IT wizardry combined to create an election winning machine of fascinating power". The book was released on 12 March 2015 and received favourable coverage.

== Reception ==
Lance Price was called to give evidence to a Select Committee of the House of Commons in January 2006, in response to his first publication of The Spin Doctor's Diary. The book caused considerable controversy when the British government tried to block its publication. He also stated that Rupert Murdoch was the 24th member of Tony Blair's cabinet.

Despite the initial and ongoing controversy, The Spin Doctor's Diary was shortlisted for Political Book of the Year in the Channel 4 News Awards of 2006. In 2008, it was named by GQ Magazine as one of the top 50 political books of all time. Matthew Parris of The Times called the book "sensational". It was criticised by Rafael Behr in The Observer for not taking us "close enough to the personalities or even the underlying motives of Campbell or Blair". However, Sir Stephen Wall, a former advisor to Blair, said that "Lance Price was right to publish, and should not be damnned". Boris Johnson, the then Mayor of London, reacted in his diary in the New Statesman: "Lance Price is a turd".

Price's second book, Time and Fate received generally favourable reviews: with Progress Magazine emphasising "The strong characterisation and compelling plotline [which] make Time and Fate a welcome, gripping page-turner…. a refreshingly engaging political novel in its own right." The Sunday Times said it was "the corking political novel that Blair's Britain so badly needs".

Price's third book, Where Power Lies, received positive reviews by critics. The Guardian described it as "witty, well informed and extremely readable". Progress, a Blairite think-tank, described it as a "thoughtful reflection on the balance of roles between the Prime Ministers and the Media," regarding its focus on Blair's relationship with the media, and how and why future Labour leaders could draw inspiration from it. Rod Liddle argued it was "required reading for those on both sides" in the Sunday Times. Total Politics reviewer Peter Riddle surmises that Price places the media question "firmly in its historical context". The Financial Times's John Lloyd described the book as an "elegant and well grounded survey of relations between premieres and the press in the UK over the past century".

Price's fourth book, The Modi Effect, was a critical assessment of the first election campaign of the Indian Prime minister, although Price made clear he would not have voted for Modi if he had been able to vote himself. The Times of India wrote that Price had "written the definitive account of the campaign that got Modi to where he is now. He tells a good story".

Price's fifth book, Petrified, was a children's story; he donated the proceeds to the Jo Cox Foundation.

== Broadcaster, lecturer and political commentator ==
Since leaving the employment of the Labour Party, Price has become an observer of British politics and world affairs, retaining his membership of the party, as he confirmed during an interview on BBC Radio 5 with Richard Bacon on 11 February 2010.

Price is a regular commentator on British and world politics on the BBC News Channel, Sky News, BBC Radio and other outlets. Since leaving politics, he has appeared as a panellist on the BBC's Question Time, and been interviewed on all leading news and current affairs programmes, including Panorama, Newsnight, Channel Four News and Dispatches, The Today Programme, The World at One, PM and The World Tonight. He broadcasts regularly on the BBC and other British TV and radio outlets, and is a regular contributor to CBS News' London Comment.

Price has written for many newspapers and magazines including The Guardian, Independent, The Daily Telegraph, The Sunday Times, The Sunday Mirror, GQ and the New Statesman. He is also an occasional contributor to the Australian Financial Review.

Price was a panellist during the 2010 general election campaign for the BBC News Channel and The World Tonight on BBC Radio 4. He has taken an increasingly independent line on political affairs, and was one of the first to call for Gordon Brown to step down as prime minister after Labour's election defeat in May 2010.

In September 2014, he published an article in the Independent criticising the then Labour leader Ed Miliband's perceived paranoia of Tony Blair, and attacking his often "too late" communication style.

In recent years, Price has lectured at the Westminster University, CELSA and Sorbonne in Paris, The Westminster Foundation, Tsinghua University in Beijing, The International School in Toulouse, the Qatar Foundation and City University Journalism School. He has spoken at the Edinburgh Television Festival, The Guardian Hay on Wye Festival, The Inverness Book Fair, the John Smith Trust and The Norwegian Public Relations Association. He has also debated motions on politics and journalism at The Oxford Union, The Durham Union and Intelligence Squared.

== The Kaleidoscope Trust ==
In September 2011, Price launched The Kaleidoscope Trust, a UK-based organisation that aims to improve LGBT rights overseas. The Trust aims to work with existing LGBT rights groups in order to advance their respective campaigns. The launch was hosted by Speaker of the House of Commons John Bercow MP, who acknowledged the "global challenge" with regard to advancing LGBT rights outside of the UK.

David Cameron, the then Prime Minister, endorsed the project: "In some countries, it's simply appalling how people can be treated – how their rights are trampled on and the prejudices, and even violence, they suffer. So I want Britain to be a global beacon for reform. That's why I am delighted to send my best wishes to Kaleidoscope, and wish them well in their work".

Labour's Leader of the Opposition, Ed Miliband, described the Trust as "an incredibly important initiative".
