= Will Adkin =

English cricketer

Personal information
- Full name: William Anthony Adkin
- Born: 9 April 1990 (age 36); Redhill, Surrey, England
- Batting: Left-handed
- Bowling: Right-arm medium

Domestic team information
- Years: Team
- 2010–2012: Sussex (squad no. 21)

Career statistics
Competition	FC	LA	T20
Matches	6	3	2
Runs scored	134	40	9
Batting average	19.14	20.00	9.00
100s/50s	–/–	–/–	–/–
Top score	45	30	8*
Balls bowled	474	96	30
Wickets	2	2	1
Bowling average	116.00	40.00	37.00
5 wickets in innings	–	–	–
10 wickets in match	–	–	–
Best bowling	1/28	1/16	1/28
Catches/stumpings	5/–	1/–	1/–
- Source: Cricinfo, 21 June 2012

William Anthony Adkin (born 9 April 1990) is an English first-class cricketer. Adkin is a left-handed batsman who bowls right-arm medium pace. He was born at Redhill, Surrey, and was educated at the Sackville School, East Grinstead, before attending Southampton Solent University.

Adkin made his debut for Sussex in a List A match against the touring Bangladeshis at the County Ground, Hove, in 2010. Batting at number eight, Adkin contributed 30 runs to Sussex's total of 253 all out, before he was dismissed by Mashrafe Mortaza. He took the wicket of Jahurul Islam in the Bangladeshis innings, with Sussex dismissing them for 104 to win the match by 149 runs. Later in that season he made his first-class debut against Surrey at Woodbridge Road, Guildford, in the County Championship. He scored 45 in the match and took figures of 1–38 with the ball. With the need to concentrate on his university studies, Adkin made just four first-class appearances in the 2011 season, playing in against Oxford MCCU in May, as well as making three appearances in the County Championship later in the season. Adkin also made two List A appearances in that seasons Clydesdale Bank 40, against Derbyshire and the Netherlands.

Following the 2011 season, Sussex were invited by the West Indies Cricket Board to take part in the 2011–12 Caribbean Twenty20 in January 2012 as an overseas team. Adkin was a part of the Sussex squad which took part in the tournament, with him making his Twenty20 debut against the Combined Campuses and Colleges. He made a second appearance in the tournament against Barbados. Adkin appeared just once for Sussex in the 2012 season, making a single first-class appearance late in Sussex's final County Championship match of the season against Durham at the Riverside Ground, Chester-le-Street. He was released by Sussex at the end of that season, with the county's professional cricket manager, Mark Robinson, stating "opportunities were limited last year for Will and seemed likely to be again next season."
