= Ian Crawford (astrobiologist) =

Ian Crawford FRAS
- Born: Ian Andrew Crawford; 1961 (age 63–64); Warrington
- Education: North Cestrian Grammar School
- Alma mater: University College London (BSc, PhD); Newcastle University (MSc)
- Scientific career
- Institutions: Birkbeck, University of London; University College London
- Thesis: A study of the interstellar medium towards the Scorpius OB1 association (1988)
- Doctoral students: Katherine Joy
- Website: www.bbk.ac.uk/geology/our-staff/ian-crawford

Ian Andrew Crawford FRAS (born 1961) is a British professor of planetary science and astrobiology at Birkbeck, University of London in the United Kingdom.

== Education and early life ==
Born in Warrington, Cheshire, Crawford was educated at North Cestrian Grammar School in Greater Manchester from 1972 to 1979. Crawford studied Astronomy at University College London (BSc, 1982) followed by Geophysics and Planetary Physics at Newcastle University (MSc, 1983). He was awarded a PhD in Astrophysics from University College London in 1988 for research on the interstellar medium.

== Career and research ==
Crawford is a specialist in the science and exploration of the Moon and in the search for life in the Universe. Before switching his research interests to planetary science in 2003, Crawford had a 15-year career at University College London as an observational astronomer specializing in studies of the interstellar medium. He is the author of over 130 peer-reviewed research papers in the fields of astronomy, planetary science, astrobiology and space exploration.

In 2021, Crawford edited a book, Expanding Worldviews: Astrobiology, Big History and Cosmic Perspectives, which explores the links between the academic disciplines of astrobiology and Big History and their wider relevance to society.

Crawford served as a Vice-President of the Royal Astronomical Society from 2017 to 2019. He is a former member of the European Space Sciences Committee (ESSC) of the European Science Foundation and of the European Space Agency's Human Spaceflight and Exploration Science Advisory Committee (HESAC).

=== Selected publications ===
- Who Speaks for Humanity? The Need for a Single Political Voice
- The Lunar Surface as a Recorder of Astrophysical Processes
- Widening Perspectives: The Intellectual and Social Benefits of Astrobiology (Regardless of Whether Extraterrestrial Life is Discovered or Not)
- The Long-Term Scientific Benefits of a Space Economy
- Lunar Resources: A Review
- Interplanetary Federalism: Maximising the Chances of Extraterrestrial Peace, Diversity and Liberty
- Avoiding Intellectual Stagnation: The Starship as an Expander of Minds
- Lunar Exploration: Opening a Window into the History and Evolution of the Inner Solar System
- Back to the Moon: The Scientific Rationale for Resuming Lunar Surface Exploration

=== Awards and honours ===
Crawford is a Fellow of the Royal Astronomical Society (FRAS). In 2021, he was awarded the Royal Astronomical Society's Service Award for Geophysics; the citation refers to his long-standing promotion of lunar science and human space exploration, his role as a mentor for young planetary scientists, and other contributions to the planetary science community. In 2023, Crawford was awarded the Michael J. Wargo NASA Exploration Science Award; the award is given to a scientist or engineer who has contributed significantly to the integration of space exploration and planetary science throughout their career.
