= Sackville School, East Grinstead =

Sackville School

Location
- Lewes Road; East Grinstead, West Sussex, RH19 3TY; England; 51°07′26″N 0°00′12″E

Information
- Type: Community school
- Motto: "Together We Achieve"
- Local authority: West Sussex
- Department for Education URN: 126089 Tables
- Ofsted: Reports
- Headteacher: Jo Meloni
- Staff: 200+ Staff Members
- Gender: Coeducational
- Age: 11 to 18
- Enrolment: 1650
- Colours: Turing, Angelou, Holmes, Attenborough, Yousafzai Communities.
- Website: sackvilleschool.org.uk

Sackville School is a maintained coeducational secondary school and sixth form located in East Grinstead, England. In 2020, the number of students was approximately 1670. Sackville is one of two state-funded secondary schools in the town, the other being Imberhorne School. The headteacher is Jo Meloni.

== History ==
The school was founded in 1859 as a national church school. Originally on De la Warr Road, where Chequer Mead lies today, in 1951, the school was renamed Sackville, and in 1964, it was moved to its current location on Lewes Road. 1970 saw the school's first comprehensive intake, following the rapidly growing local housing estate building developments. In 2004, Sackville's name was changed back from Sackville Community College to Sackville School. The school's emblem is the red rose of the Duchy of Lancaster of which East Grinstead was once a part.

In 2007, a new building on the site was constructed. It contains a large sports hall, gym, multiple offices and four classrooms.

The current headteacher, Jo Meloni, joined the school in 2022. There are seven year groups, including a Sixth Form for years twelve and thirteen.

The school's most recent Ofsted inspection was in 2024, a two-day inspection confirming the school's 2019 grade of "good".

== Notable former pupils ==
- William Adkin (born 1990), cricketer
- Gavin Collins (born 1966), Church of England bishop
- Rob Cross (1990), professional darts player
- Nicola Edgington (born 1980), murderer.
- Nick Harvey (born 1971), composer
- Laura van der Heijden (born 1997-), cellist
- Katherine Joy, Reader in Geology at the University of Manchester
- Jane Leeves (born 1961), actress (played Daphne in Frasier)
- Drew Pearce (born 1975), film and television writer and producer
- Lance Price (born 1958), journalist and political commentator
- Ian Willcock (born 1959), British composer and academic
