= Cosmic Evolution =

Book by Eric Chaisson

Cosmic Evolution: The Rise of Complexity in Nature
- Author: Eric Chaisson
- Publisher: Harvard University Press
- Publication date: February 16, 2001
- ISBN: 9780674003422

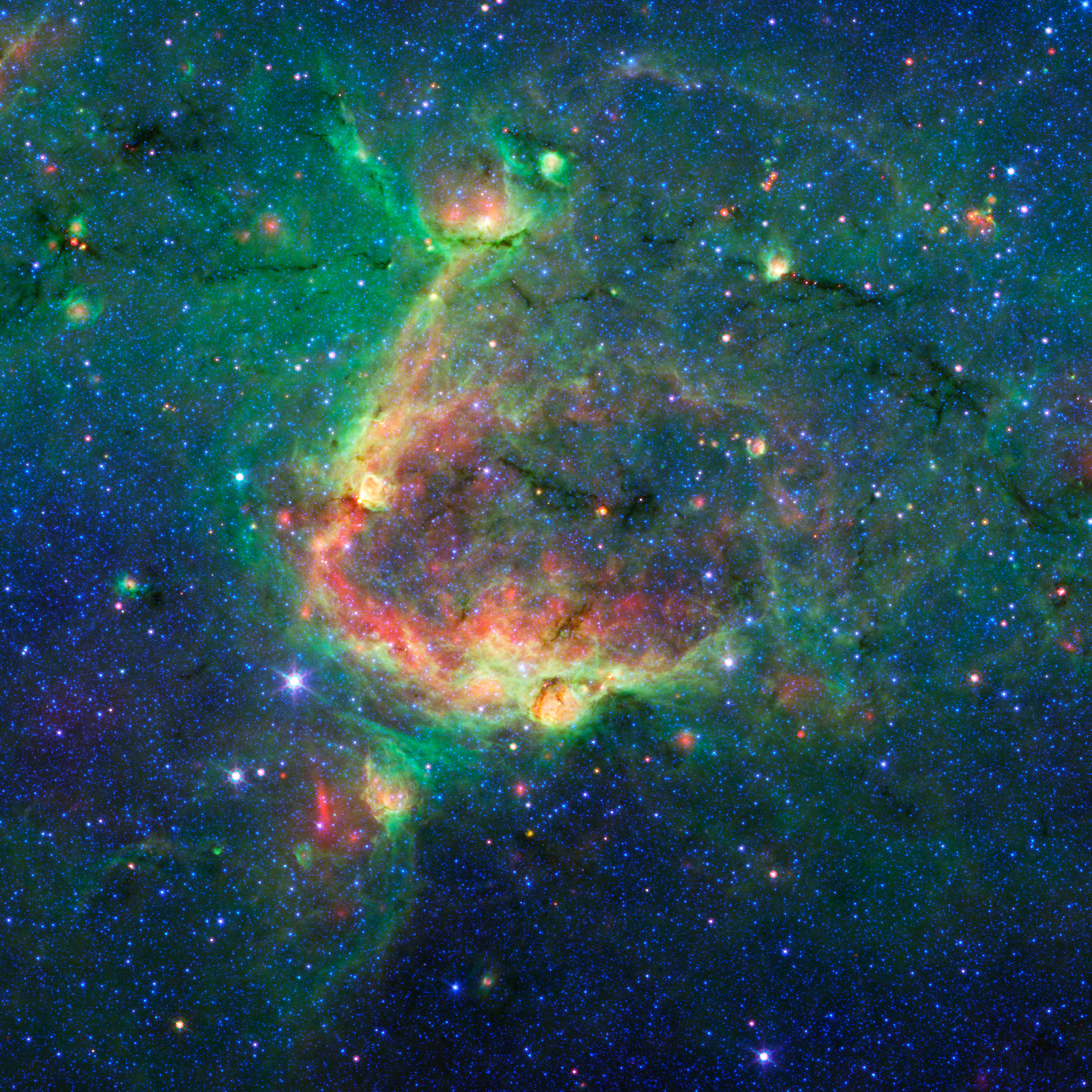
Astrophysicist Eric Chaisson argues in Cosmic Evolution that optimal energy flows are the key to understanding the origin and evolution of complexity, whether in stars and galaxies (photo courtesy STScI/NASA) or in carbon-based structures such as life-forms and the human brain.

Cosmic Evolution: The Rise of Complexity in Nature (2001) is a book by Harvard astrophysicist Eric Chaisson. It examines cosmic evolution which includes the history of natural evolution from the Big Bang to the present from the perspective of the emerging multi-scientific discipline of Big History. It offers an explanation of why simple structures billions of years ago gave way to more complex structures, such as stars, planets, life, and human beings in complex civilizations. It is written for a general audience interested in science.

== Overview ==
Chaisson argues that cosmic history can be examined from the perspective of energy flows. He analyzes the flows of energy through various objects and argues that these flows are relevant to understanding the relative complexity of these objects. He suggests that a key measure for scientific analysis should be energy per second per gram, termed "energy rate density," and that analysis using this yardstick can be used to explain not only human evolution but cosmic evolution. He sees energy as "work per unit time" which he equates with power, and shows how energy rate density in some structures has increased over time. For example, in Chaisson's view, the human brain uses a much greater amount of energy, relative to its size, than a galaxy. He suggests that energy lets us make "order out of disorder"; for example, an air conditioner, which draws current from an electric outlet, can turn a less-complex zone of lukewarm air into two more-complex zones of hot air and cold air, and in so doing, it reverses the disorder in a room. According to his view, organisms do much the same thing with energy but in a more complex way, by taking in food instead of electrons, to keep themselves from disintegrating and becoming less complex; he analyzes energy flows in not just organisms and society but in inanimate structures such as stars, galaxies, planets.

Chaisson notes that increases in complexity are consistent with the second law of thermodynamics; according to one reviewer, the second law might suggest that complexity should decrease with the universe "slouching toward disorder." However, Chaisson argues that complexity can increase because complex structures such as a star can "generate and sustain complexity by exporting enough disorder to its surrounding environment to more than makeup for its internal gains." From this perspective, Chaisson offers a definition of life as an "open, coherent, space-time structure maintained far from thermodynamic equilibrium by a flow of energy through it."

Reactions to Chaisson's book are generally positive, although different reviewers took issue with some of his points and writing style. Biologist Daniel W. McShea originally noted that Chaisson is "prone to using inflated language," but a decade later in another review of his work notes that "Chaisson offers data showing a trend in what he calls energy rate density ... over the history of life (and even over the much longer history of the universe), that's really saying something." Critic Stuart Kauffman found the book to be a "wonderful discussion." Critic Hillel Braude wrote "Cosmic Evolution draws from a rich scientific palette to paint a colorful explanatory model of the ascending complexity in nature." Critic Charles Seife wrote highly about Chaisson's book although he criticized Chaisson's definition of life as being "such a broad definition" that it becomes meaningless while acknowledging that Chaisson's analysis "gives the theory some numerical muscle." Many more excerpts from reviews of this book are collected here

== Choice of units ==
Chaisson chose to use the obsolete cgs (centimeter, gram, second) system of measurement, rather than SI units as is standard current practice, for his calculations and numerical estimates - thus quoting energy in ergs (one ten-millionth of a Joule), also using calories, and sometimes kilocalories as alternative measures of energy.
