= Big History =

Education strategy or academic discipline

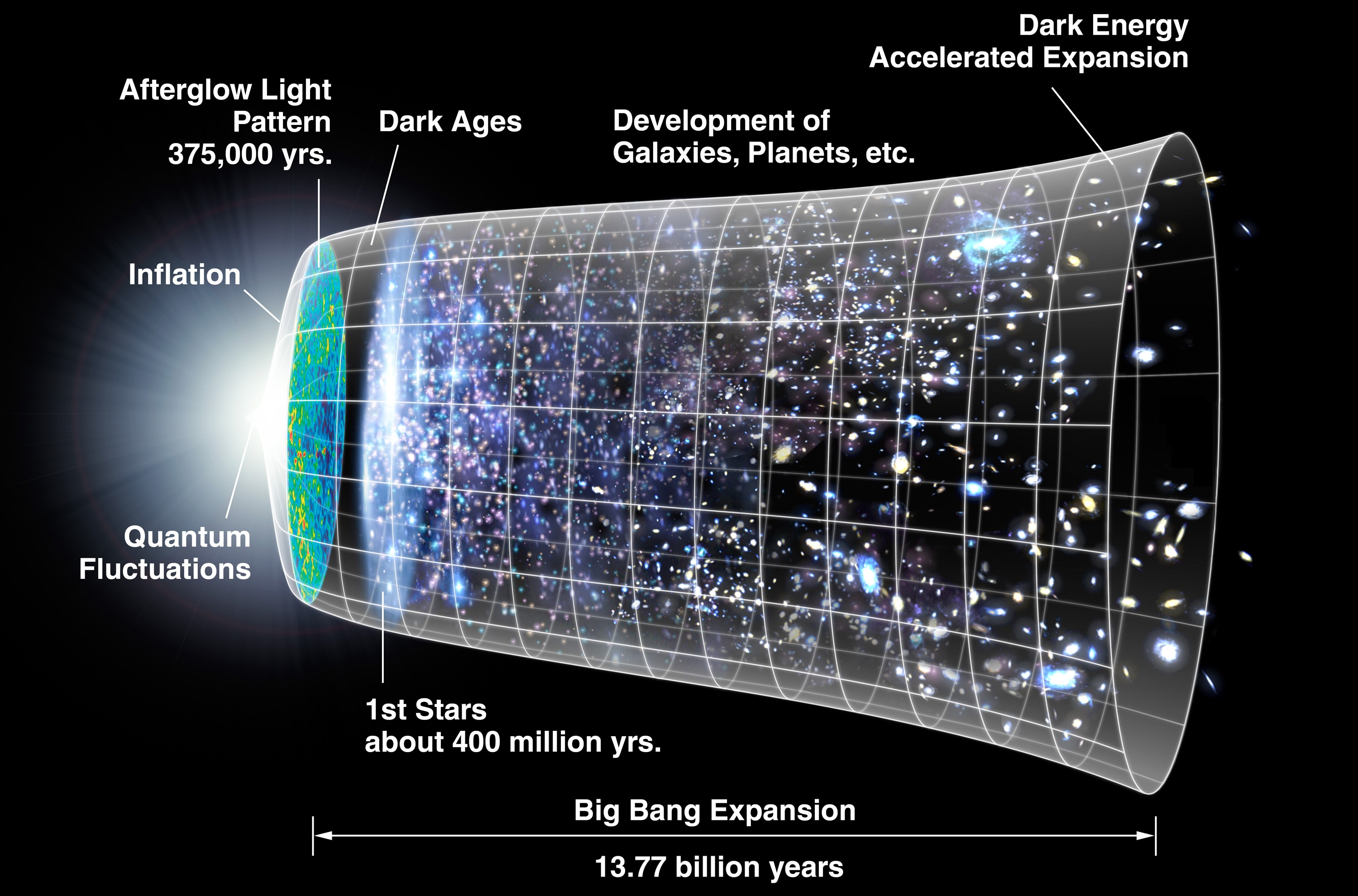
A diagram of the Big Bang expansion according to NASA

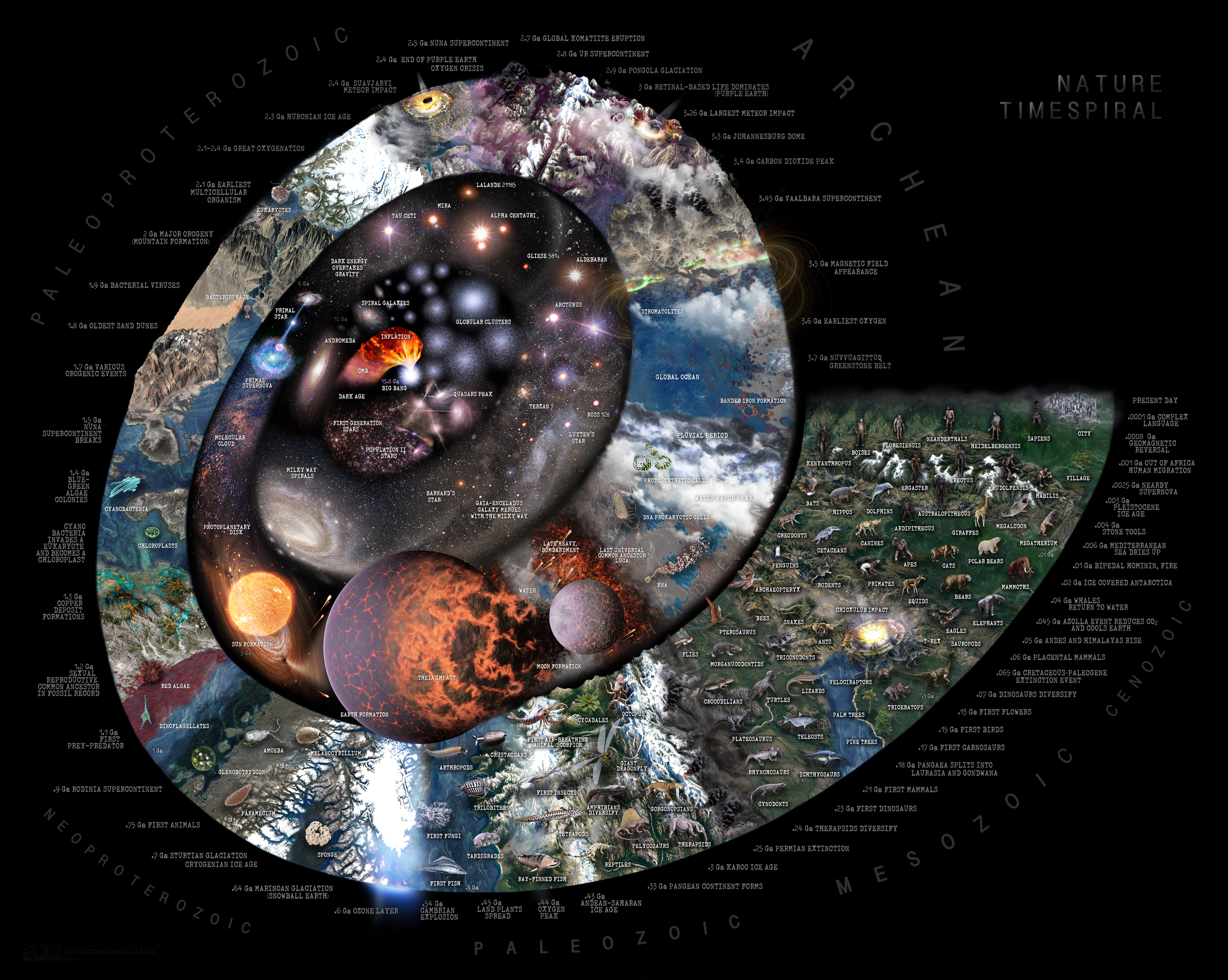
Notable events from the Big Bang to the present day depicted in a spiral layout. Every billion years (Ga) is represented in 90 degrees of rotation.

Big History is an academic discipline that examines history from the Big Bang to the present. Big History resists specialization and searches for universal patterns or trends. It examines long time frames using a multidisciplinary approach based on combining numerous disciplines from science and the humanities. It explores human existence in the context of this bigger picture. It integrates studies of the cosmos, Earth, life, and humanity using empirical evidence to explore cause-and-effect relations. It is taught at universities as well as primary and secondary schools often using web-based interactive presentations.

Historian David Christian has been credited with coining the term "Big History" while teaching one of the first such courses at Macquarie University. An all-encompassing study of humanity's relationship to cosmology and natural history has been pursued by scholars since the Renaissance, and the new field, Big History, continues such work.

== Comparison with conventional history ==
Big History examines the past using numerous time scales, from the Big Bang to modernity, unlike conventional history courses which typically begin with the introduction of farming and civilization, or with the beginning of written records. It explores common themes and patterns. Courses generally do not focus on humans until one-third to halfway through, and, unlike conventional history courses, there is not much focus on kingdoms or civilizations or wars or national borders. If conventional history focuses on human civilization with humankind at the center, Big History focuses on the universe and shows how humankind fits within this framework and places human history in the wider context of the universe's history.

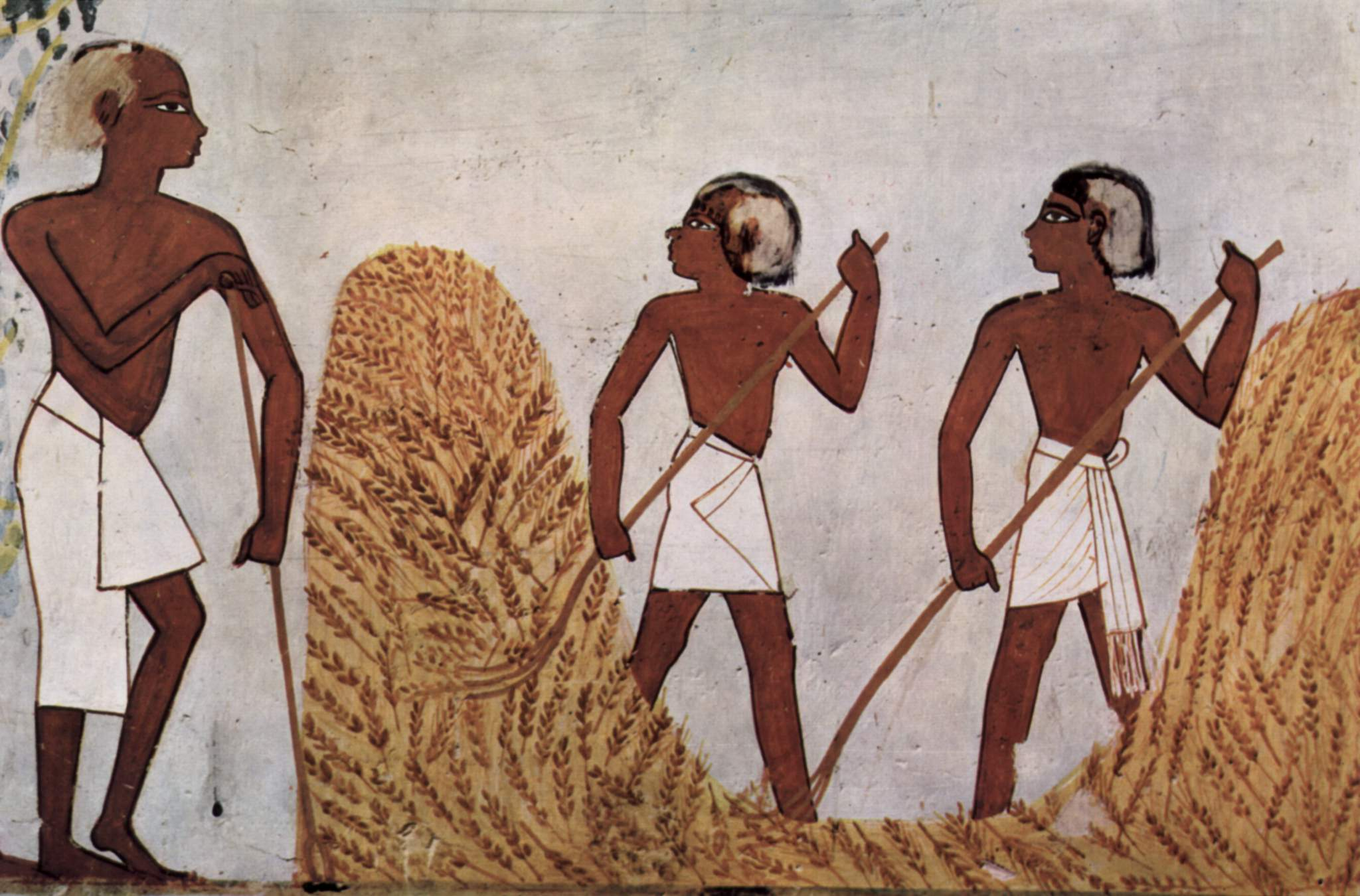
Conventional history often begins with the development of agriculture in civilizations such as Ancient Egypt.

Unlike conventional history, Big History tends to go rapidly through detailed historical eras such as the Renaissance or Ancient Egypt. It draws on the latest findings from biology, astronomy, geoscience, chemistry, physics, archaeology, anthropology, psychology, sociology, economics, prehistory, ancient history, and natural history, as well as standard history. One teacher explained:

We're taking the best evidence from physics and the best evidence from chemistry and biology, and we're weaving it together into a story ... They're not going to learn how to balance [chemical] equations, but they're going to learn how the chemical elements came out of the death of stars, and that's really interesting.

Big History arose from a desire to go beyond the specialized and self-contained fields that emerged in the 20th century. It tries to grasp history as a whole, looking for common themes across multiple time scales in history. Conventional history typically begins with the invention of writing, and is limited to past events relating directly to the human race. Big Historians point out that this limits study to the past 5,000 years and neglects the much longer time when humans existed on Earth. Henry Kannberg sees Big History as being a product of the Information Age, a stage in history itself following speech, writing, and printing. Big History covers the formation of the universe, stars, and galaxies, and includes the beginning of life as well as the period of several hundred thousand years when humans were hunter-gatherers. It sees the transition to civilization as a gradual one, with many causes and effects, rather than an abrupt transformation from uncivilized static cavemen to dynamic civilized farmers. An account in The Boston Globe describes what it polemically asserts to be the conventional "history" view:

Early humans were slump-shouldered, slope-browed, hairy brutes. They hunkered over campfires and ate scorched meat. Sometimes they carried spears. Once in a while they scratched pictures of antelopes on the walls of their caves. That's what I learned during elementary school, anyway. History didn't start with the first humans—they were cavemen! The Stone Age wasn't history; the Stone Age was a preamble to history, a dystopian era of stasis before the happy onset of civilization, and the arrival of nifty developments like chariot wheels, gunpowder, and Google. History started with agriculture, nation-states, and written documents. History began in Mesopotamia's Fertile Crescent, somewhere around 4000 BC. It began when we finally overcame our savage legacy, and culture surpassed biology.

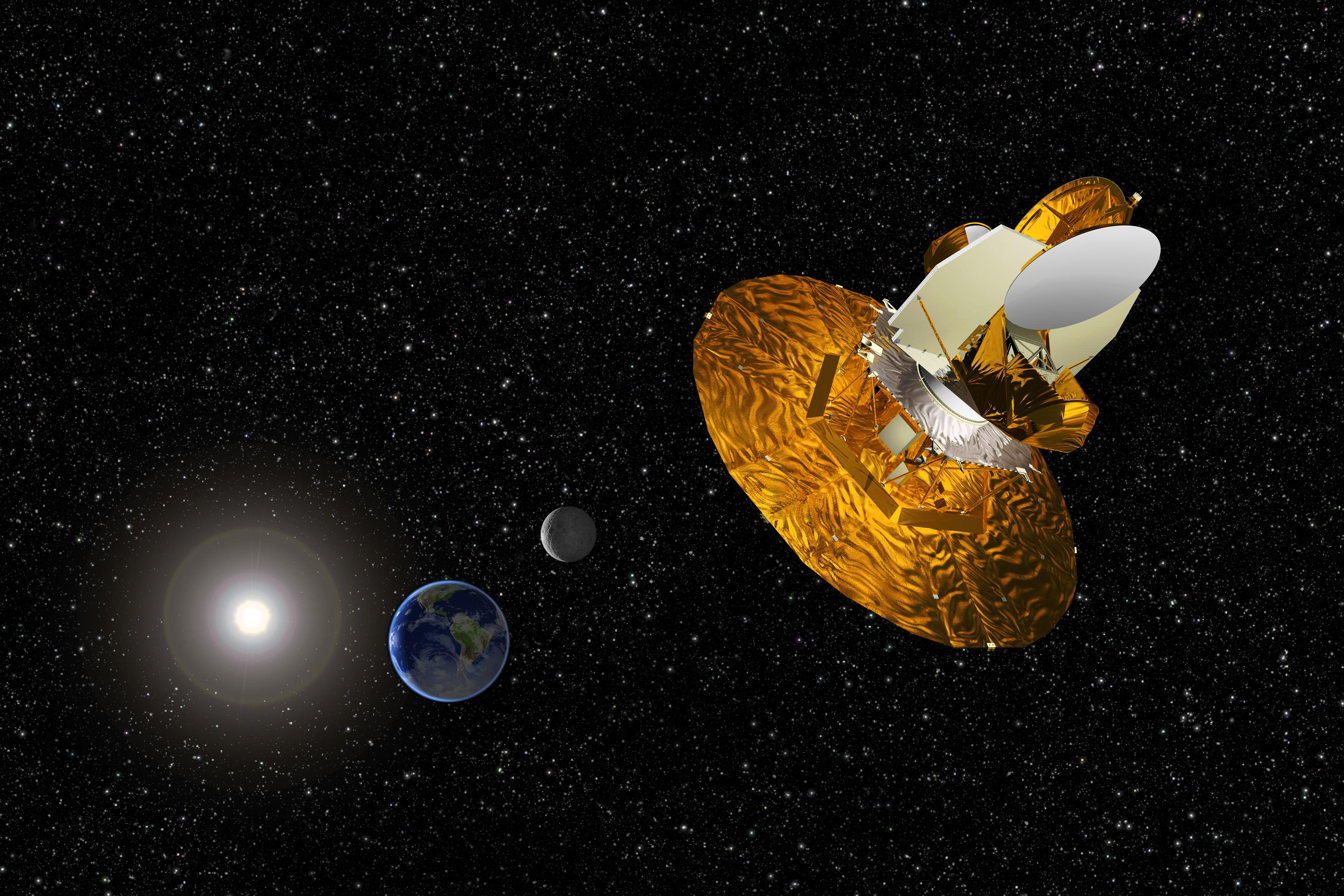
Artist's depiction of the WMAP satellite gathering data to help scientists understand the Big Bang

Big History, in contrast to conventional history, has more of an interdisciplinary basis. Advocates sometimes view conventional history as "microhistory" or "shallow history", and note that three-quarters of historians specialize in understanding the last 250 years while ignoring the "long march of human existence." However, one historian disputed that the discipline of history has overlooked the big view, and described the "grand narrative" of Big History as a "cliché that gets thrown around a lot." One account suggested that conventional history had the "sense of grinding the nuts into an ever finer powder." It emphasizes long-term trends and processes rather than history-making individuals or events. Historian Dipesh Chakrabarty of the University of Chicago suggested that Big History was less politicized than contemporary history because it enables people to "take a step back." It uses more kinds of evidence than the standard historical written records, such as fossils, tools, household items, pictures, structures, ecological changes and genetic variations.

=== Historian’s Big History ===
Some historians have developed approaches to Big History that keep traditional historical methods at the center. These versions of the field link human history to natural history but still rely on narrative explanation, cultural evolution, and comparative study. In this view, Big History is not only about cosmic or biological change but also about how human societies develop over time.

This approach has roots in Enlightenment universal history and in the work of macrohistorians such as William H. McNeill, who argued that human communities must be understood in relation to one another and within their wider environmental settings. David Christian’s early Big History courses also followed this pattern, combining scientific accounts of the universe with conventional historical interpretation.

Historian-centered Big History often highlights:

- cultural evolution and the passing of knowledge across generations;
- long-term social development and institutional change;
- comparisons among societies and regions;
- narrative causation and human agency;
- scales of analysis that are large but still historically meaningful.

This perspective differs from versions of Big History that rely mainly on complexity science or cosmic evolution. Historian-centered work argues that human societies require interpretive tools from the humanities, including textual analysis and institutional history. Recent scholarship has applied these ideas to specific regions and periods, showing how human development can be studied within the broader context of cosmology, geology, and biology.

=== Criticism of Big History ===
Critics of Big History, including sociologist Frank Furedi, have deemed the discipline an "anti-humanist turn of history." The Big History narrative has also been challenged for failing to engage with the methodology of the conventional history discipline. According to historian and educator Sam Wineburg of Stanford University, Big History eschews the interpretation of texts in favor of a purely scientific approach, thus becoming "less history and more of a kind of evolutionary biology or quantum physics."

=== Time scales and questions ===
Big History makes comparisons based on different time scales and notes similarities and differences between the human, geological, and cosmological scales. David Christian believes such "radical shifts in perspective" will yield "new insights into familiar historical problems, from the nature/nurture debate to environmental history to the fundamental nature of change itself." It shows how human existence has been changed by both human-made and natural factors: for example, according to natural processes which happened more than four billion years ago, iron emerged from the remains of an exploding star and, as a result, humans could use this hard metal to forge weapons for hunting and war. The discipline addresses such questions as "How did we get here?," "How do we decide what to believe?," "How did Earth form?," and "What is life?" According to Fred Spier it offers a "grand tour of all the major scientific paradigms" and helps students to become scientifically literate quickly. One interesting perspective that arises from Big History is that despite the vast temporal and spatial scales of the history of the Universe, it is actually very small pockets of the cosmos where most of the "history" is happening, due to the nature of complexity.

=== Cosmic evolution ===
Nature timeline
← / Earliest stars; ← / Earliest galaxy; ← / Earliest quasar / black hole; ← / Omega Centauri; ← / Andromeda Galaxy; ← / Milky Way spirals; ← / NGC 188 star cluster; ← / Alpha Centauri; ← / Accelerated expansion; ← / Earth / Solar System; ← / Earliest known life; ← / Atmospheric oxygen; ← / Sexual reproduction; ← / Earliest fungi; ← / Earliest land plants; ← / Cambrian explosion; ← / Earliest mammals; ← / Earliest apes / humans
(billion years ago)

Cosmic evolution, the scientific study of universal change, is closely related to Big History (as are the allied subjects of the epic of evolution and astrobiology); some researchers regard cosmic evolution as broader than Big History, since the latter mainly examines the specific historical trek from Big Bang → Milky Way → Sun → Earth → humanity. Cosmic evolution, while fully addressing all complex systems (and not merely those that led to humans) has been taught and researched for decades, mostly by astronomers and astrophysicists. This Big-Bang-to-humankind scenario well preceded the subject that some historians began calling Big History in the 1990s. Cosmic evolution is an intellectual framework that offers a grand synthesis of the many varied changes in the assembly and composition of radiation, matter, and life throughout the history of the universe. While engaging in issues of the origins of humanity, this interdisciplinary subject attempts to unify the sciences within the entirety of natural history—a single, inclusive scientific narrative of the origin and evolution of all material things over ~14 billion years, from the origin of the universe to the present day on Earth.

The roots of the idea of cosmic evolution extend back millennia. Ancient Greek philosophers in the fifth century BCE, most notably Heraclitus, are celebrated for their reasoned claims that all things change. Early modern speculation about cosmic evolution began more than a century ago, including the broad insights of Robert Chambers, Herbert Spencer, Charles Sanders Peirce, and Lawrence Henderson. Only in the mid-20th century was the cosmic-evolutionary scenario articulated as a research paradigm to include empirical studies of galaxies, stars, planets, and life—in short, an expansive agenda that combines physical, biological, and cultural evolution. Harlow Shapley widely articulated the idea of cosmic evolution (often calling it "cosmography") in public venues at mid-century, and NASA embraced it in the late 20th century as part of its more limited astrobiology program. Carl Sagan, Eric Chaisson, Hubert Reeves, Erich Jantsch, and Preston Cloud, among others, extensively championed cosmic evolution at roughly the same time around 1980. This extremely broad subject now continues to be formulated as both a technical research program and a scientific worldview for the 21st century.

One popular collection of scholarly materials on cosmic evolution is based on teaching and research that has been underway at Harvard University since the mid-1970s.

=== Complexity, energy, thresholds ===
Cosmic evolution is a quantitative subject, whereas Big History typically is not; this is because cosmic evolution is practiced mostly by natural scientists, while Big History by social scholars. These two subjects, closely allied and overlapping, benefit from each other; cosmic evolutionists tend to treat universal history linearly, thus humankind enters their story only at the most very recent times, whereas big historians tend to stress humanity and its many cultural achievements, granting human beings a larger part of their story. People can compare and contrast these different emphases by watching two short movies portraying the Big-Bang-to-humankind narrative, one animating time linearly, and the other capturing time (actually look-back time) logarithmically; in the former, humans enter this 14-minute movie in the last second, while in the latter they appear much earlier—yet both are correct.

These different treatments of time over ~14 billion years, each with different emphases on historical content, are further clarified by noting that some cosmic evolutionists divide the whole narrative into three phases and seven epochs:

Phases: physical evolution → biological evolution → cultural evolution
Epochs: particulate → galactic → stellar → planetary → chemical → biological → cultural

This contrasts with the approach used by some big historians who divide the narrative into many more thresholds, as noted in the discussion at the end of this section below. Yet another telling of the Big-Bang-to-humankind story is one that emphasizes the earlier universe, particularly the growth of particles, galaxies, and large-scale cosmic structure, such as in physical cosmology.

Notable among quantitative efforts to describe cosmic evolution are Eric Chaisson's research efforts to describe the concept of energy flow through open, thermodynamic systems, including galaxies, stars, planets, life, and society. The observed increase of energy rate density (energy/time/mass) among a whole host of complex systems is one useful way to explain the rise of complexity in an expanding universe that still obeys the cherished second law of thermodynamics and thus continues to accumulate net entropy. As such, ordered material systems—from buzzing bees and redwood trees to shining stars and thinking beings—are viewed as temporary, local islands of order in a vast, global sea of disorder. A recent review article, which is especially directed toward big historians, summarizes much of this empirical effort over the past decade.

One striking finding of such complexity studies is the apparently ranked order among all known material systems in the universe. Although the absolute energy in astronomical systems greatly exceeds that of humans, and although the mass densities of stars, planets, bodies, and brains are all comparable, the energy rate density for humans and modern human society are approximately a million times greater than for stars and galaxies. For example, while the Sun's luminosity is extremely high (4×10^{26} W), its mass is also extremely high (2×10^{30} kg), resulting in a low radiant energy density (2×10^{−4} W/kg). Compared to stars, more energy flows through each gram of a plant's leaf during photosynthesis, and much more (nearly a million times) rushes through each gram of a human brain while thinking (~20 W per 1350 g).

Cosmic evolution is more than a subjective listing of subsequent events or phenomena. This inclusive scientific worldview constitutes an objective, quantitative approach toward deciphering much of what comprises organized, material nature. Its uniform, consistent philosophy of approach toward all complex systems demonstrates that the basic differences, both within and among many varied systems, are of degree, not of kind. And, in particular, it suggests that optimal ranges of energy rate density grant opportunities for the evolution of complexity; those systems able to adjust, adapt, or otherwise take advantage of such energy flows survive and prosper, while other systems adversely affected by too much or too little energy are non-randomly eliminated.

Fred Spier is foremost among those big historians who have found the concept of energy flows useful, suggesting that Big History is the rise and demise of complexity on all scales, from sub-microscopic particles to vast galaxy clusters, and not least many biological and cultural systems in between.

David Christian, in an 18-minute TED talk, described some of the basics of the Big History course. Christian describes each stage in the progression towards greater complexity as a "threshold moment" when things become more complex, but they also become more fragile and mobile. Some of Christian's threshold stages are:

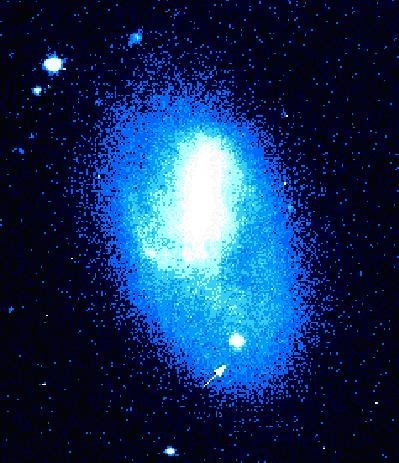
In a supernova, a star which has exhausted most of its energy bursts in an incredible explosion, creating conditions for heavier elements such as iron and gold to form.

1. The universe appears, incredibly hot, busting, expanding, within a second.
2. Stars are born.
3. Stars die, creating temperatures hot enough to make complex chemicals, as well as rocks, asteroids, planets, moons, and our solar system.
4. Earth is formed.
5. Life appears on Earth, with molecules growing from the Goldilocks conditions, with neither too much nor too little energy.
6. Humans appear, language, collective learning.

Christian elaborated that more complex systems are more fragile, and that while collective learning is a powerful force to advance humanity in general, it is not clear that humans are in charge of it, and it is possible in his view for humans to destroy the biosphere with the powerful weapons that have been invented.

In the 2008 lecture series through The Teaching Company's Great Courses entitled Big History: The Big Bang, Life on Earth, and the Rise of Humanity, Christian explains Big History in terms of eight thresholds of increasing complexity:

1. The Big Bang and the creation of the Universe about 14 billion years ago
2. The creation of the first complex objects, stars, about 12 billion years ago
3. The creation of chemical elements inside dying stars required for chemically complex objects, including plants and animals
4. The formation of planets, such as our Earth, which are more chemically complex than the Sun
5. The origin and evolution of life from roughly about 4.2 billion years ago, including the evolution of our hominine ancestors
6. The development of our species, Homo sapiens, about 300,000 years ago, covering the Paleolithic era of human history
7. The appearance of agriculture about 11,000 years ago in the Neolithic era, allowing for larger, more complex societies
8. The "modern revolution", or the vast social, economic, and cultural transformations that brought the world into the modern era
9. What will happen in the future and predicting what will be the next threshold in our history

=== Goldilocks conditions ===
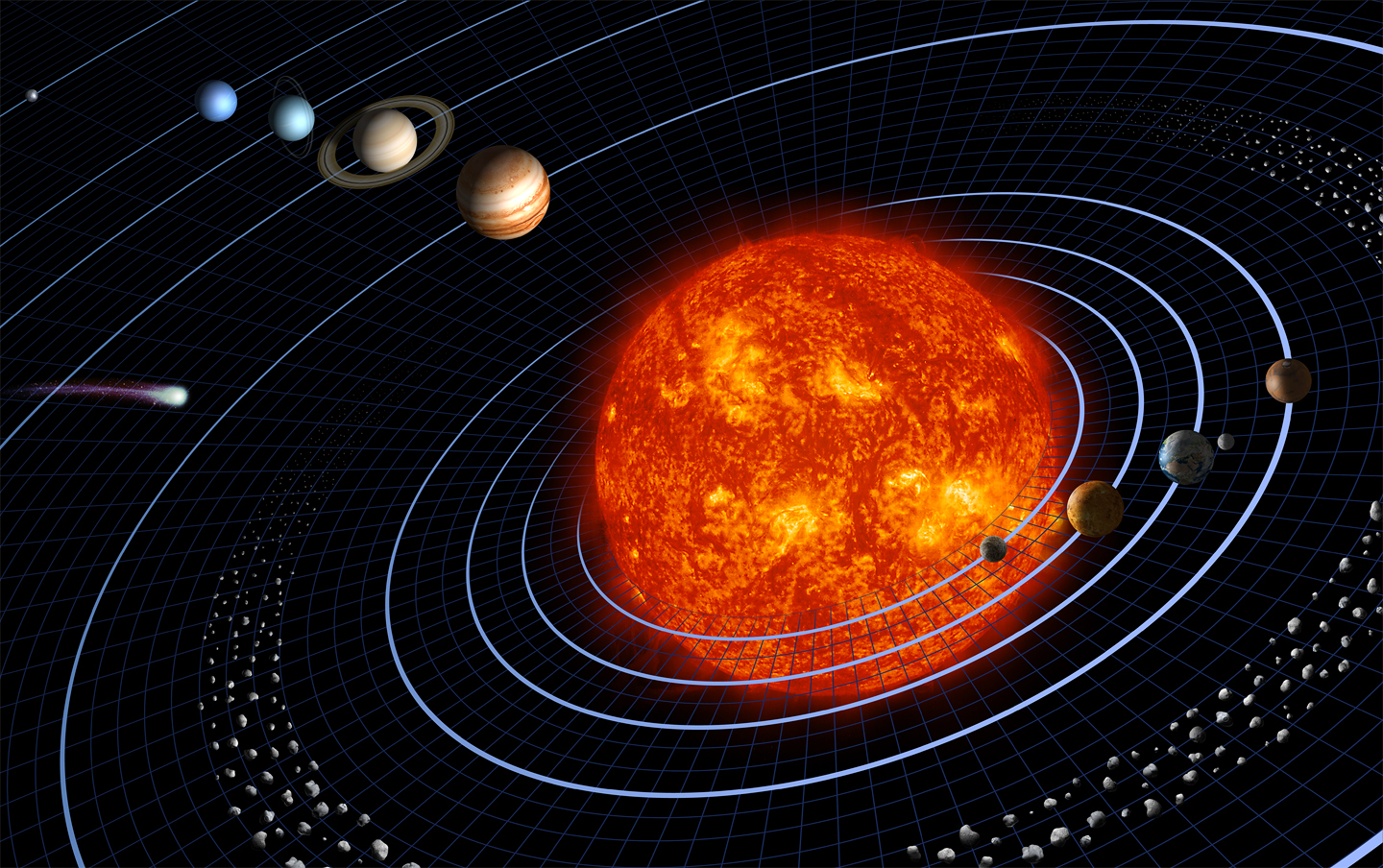
The Earth is ideally located in a Goldilocks condition—being neither too close nor too distant from the Sun.

A theme in Big History is what has been termed Goldilocks conditions or the Goldilocks principle, which describes how "circumstances must be right for any type of complexity to form or continue to exist," as emphasized by Spier in his recent book. For humans, bodily temperatures can neither be too hot nor too cold; for life to form on a planet, it can neither have too much nor too little energy from sunlight. Stars require sufficient quantities of hydrogen, sufficiently packed together under tremendous gravity, to cause nuclear fusion.

Christian suggests that complexity arises when these Goldilocks conditions are met, that is, when things are not too hot or cold, not too fast or slow. For example, life began not in solids (molecules are stuck together, preventing the right kinds of associations) or gases (molecules move too fast to enable favorable associations) but in liquids such as water that permitted the right kinds of interactions at the right speeds.

Somewhat in contrast, Chaisson has maintained for well more than a decade that "organizational complexity is mostly governed by the optimum use of energy—not too little as to starve a system, yet not too much as to destroy it". Neither maximum energy principles nor minimum entropy states are likely relevant to appreciate the emergence of complexity in Nature writ large.

=== Other themes ===
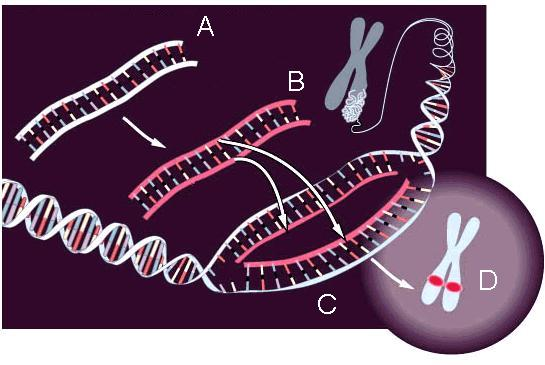
Big Historians use information based on scientific techniques such as gene mapping to learn more about the origins of humanity.

Advances in particular sciences such as archaeology, gene mapping, and evolutionary ecology have enabled historians to gain new insights into the early origins of humans, despite the lack of written sources. One account suggested that proponents of Big History were trying to "upend" the conventional practice in historiography of relying on written records.

Big History proponents suggest that humans have been affecting climate change throughout history, by such methods as slash-and-burn agriculture, although past modifications have been on a lesser scale than in recent years during the Industrial Revolution.

A book by Daniel Lord Smail in 2008 suggested that history was a continuing process of humans learning to self-modify our mental states by using stimulants such as coffee and tobacco, as well as other means such as religious rites or romance novels. His view is that culture and biology are highly intertwined, such that cultural practices may cause human brains to be wired differently from those in different societies.

Another theme that has been actively discussed recently by the Big History community is the issue of the Big History Singularity.

A 2021 book, Expanding Worldviews: Astrobiology, Big History and Cosmic Perspectives, edited by Ian Crawford explores links between Big History and astrobiology, and argues that both subjects have the potential to yield positive intellectual and societal benefits owing to their inherent cosmic and evolutionary perspectives.

Paleoanthropologist Brian Villmoare, in The Evolution of Everything: The Patterns and Causes of Big History (2023), emphasizes that human behavior is a specific instance of animal and especially primate behavior, and follows predictable patterns inferred from primatology and animal behavior studies. The book also focuses on the Enlightenment as a notable deviation from these patterns, and the causes and consequences of this relatively recent philosophical shift.

== Presentation by web-based interactive video ==
Big History is more likely than conventional history to be taught with interactive "video-heavy" websites without textbooks, according to one account. The discipline has benefited from having new ways of presenting themes and concepts in new formats, often supplemented by Internet and computer technology. For example, the ChronoZoom project is a way to explore the 14 billion year history of the universe in an interactive website format. It was described in one account:

ChronoZoom splays out the entirety of cosmic history in a web browser, where users can click into different epochs to learn about the events that have culminated to bring us to where we are today—in my case, sitting in an office chair writing about space. Eager to learn about the Stelliferous epoch? Click away, my fellow explorer. Curious about the formation of the earth? Jump into the "Earth and Solar System" section to see historian David Christian talk about the birth of our homeworld.

— TechCrunch, 2012

In 2012, the History channel showed the film History of the World in Two Hours. It showed how dinosaurs effectively dominated mammals for 160 million years until an asteroid impact wiped them out. One report suggested the History channel had won a sponsorship from StanChart to develop a Big History program entitled Mankind. In 2013 the History channel's new H2 network debuted the 10-part series Big History, narrated by Bryan Cranston and featuring David Christian and an assortment of historians, scientists and related experts. Each episode centered on a major Big History topic such as salt, mountains, cold, flight, water, meteors and megastructures.

== History of the field ==
=== Early efforts ===
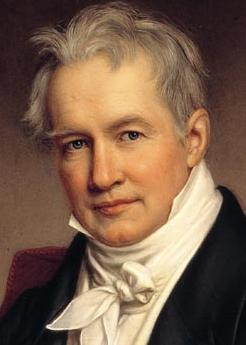
Alexander von Humboldt in 1843

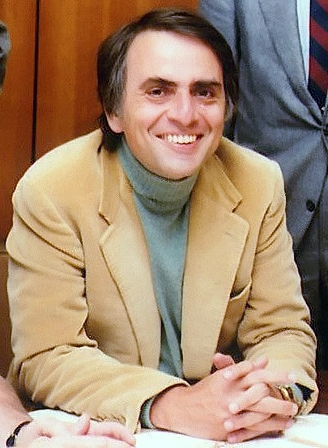
Astronomer Carl Sagan

While the emerging field of Big History in its present state is generally seen as having emerged in the past three decades beginning around 1990, there have been numerous precedents going back to the 1500s with Giordano Bruno's works, especially Lo spaccio della besta trionfante (1584)(The Return of the Triumphant Beast). In this work, Bruno traces out the decline of the Christian era and posits that this decline will be based on a massive ecological and economic crisis, which he allegorizes as a 'cetus', a whale, whose thrashings create disruptive waves and cause people to question the religious and philosophical underpinnings of the west. According to Bruno, it is exactly the laser-like focus, for hundreds of years, on the economic growth and spread of people (through colonialism and capitalism, which were rationalized through Christianity) that will lead to an environmental tipping point, or crisis, when humans recognize that their own material well being is predicated and completely dependent on the presence of myriad other beings, animals, plankton, plants, bacteria, and so forth. In a sense, Bruno's work foresaw the Material Turn, which dates to the 1990s. It should be stressed that Bruno sees this flow of history as based on evolution and the learning curve. In the mid-19th century, Alexander von Humboldt's book Cosmos, and Robert Chambers' 1844 book Vestiges of the Natural History of Creation were seen as early precursors to the field. In a sense, Darwin's theory of evolution was, in itself, an attempt to explain a biological phenomenon by examining longer term cause-and-effect processes. In the first half of the 20th century, secular biologist Julian Huxley originated the term "evolutionary humanism", while around the same time the French Jesuit paleontologist Pierre Teilhard de Chardin examined links between cosmic evolution and a tendency towards complexification (including human consciousness), while envisaging compatibility between cosmology, evolution, and theology. In the mid and later 20th century, The Ascent of Man by Jacob Bronowski examined history from a multidisciplinary perspective. Later, Eric Chaisson explored the subject of cosmic evolution quantitatively in terms of energy rate density, and the astronomer Carl Sagan wrote Cosmos. Thomas Berry, a cultural historian, and the academic Brian Swimme explored meaning behind myths and encouraged academics to explore themes beyond organized religion.

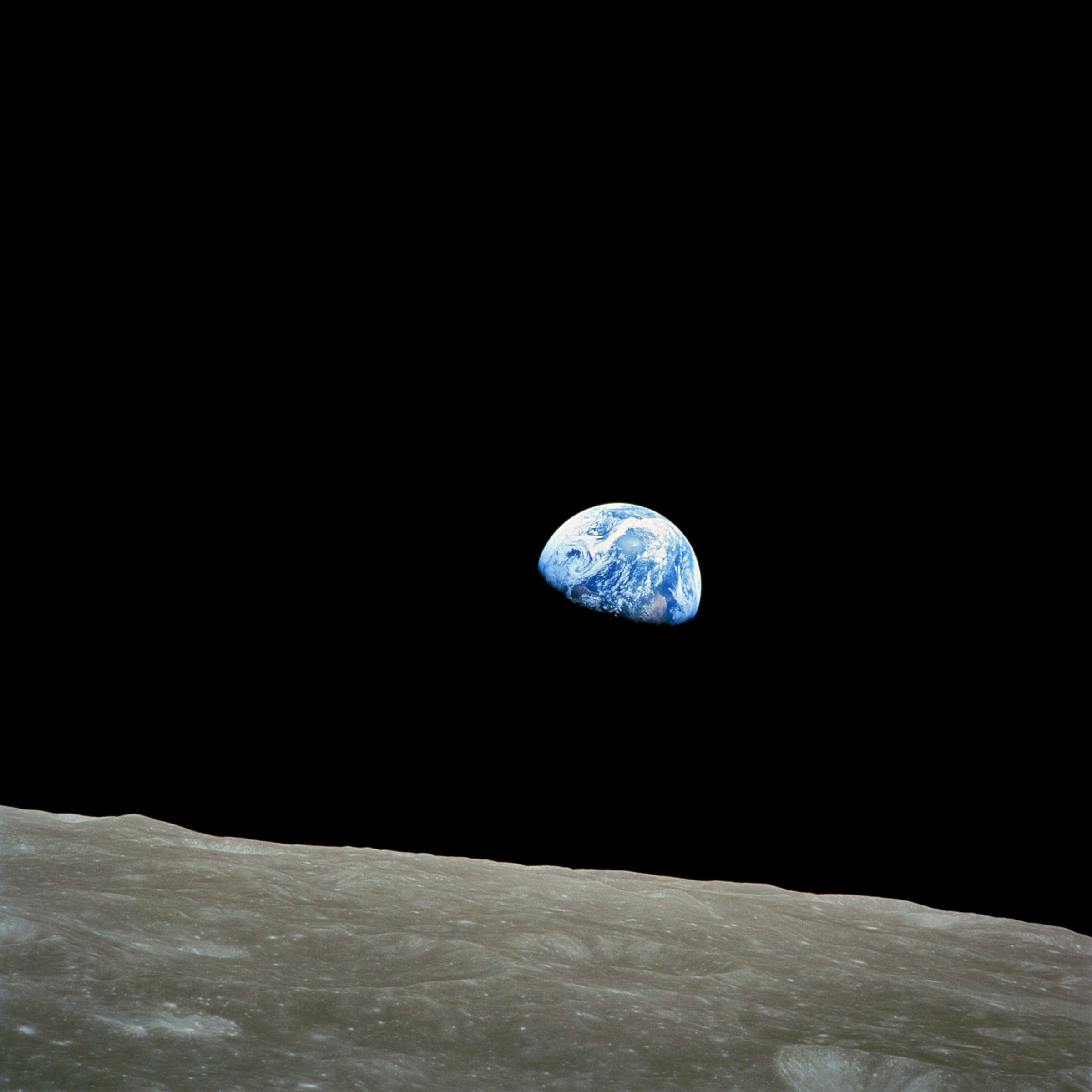
The famous 1968 Earthrise photo, taken by astronaut William Anders, may have stimulated, among other things, an interest in interdisciplinary studies.

The field continued to evolve from interdisciplinary studies during the mid-20th century, stimulated in part by the Cold War and the Space Race. Some early efforts were courses in Cosmic Evolution at Harvard University in the United States, and Universal History in the Soviet Union. One account suggested that the notable Earthrise photo, taken on December 24, 1968, by William Anders during a lunar orbit aboard Apollo 8, which showed Earth as a small blue and white ball behind a stark and desolate lunar landscape, not only stimulated the environmental movement but also caused an upsurge of interdisciplinary interest. The French historian Fernand Braudel examined daily life with investigations of "large-scale historical forces like geology and climate". Physiologist Jared Diamond in his 1997 book Guns, Germs, and Steel examined the interplay between geography and human evolution; for example, he argued that the horizontal shape of the Eurasian continent enabled human civilizations to advance more quickly than the vertical north–south shape of the American continent, because an east–west continental axis and correspondingly similar climates facilitated the transfer and exchange of animals (as protein, for pulling carts, and other uses), ideas and information, as well as structures of human competition that honed and fine-tuned cultural and technological achievements.

In the 1970s, scholars in the United States including geologist Preston Cloud of the University of Minnesota, astronomer G. Siegfried Kutter at Evergreen State College in Washington state, and Harvard University astrophysicists George B. Field and Eric Chaisson started synthesizing knowledge to form a "science-based history of everything", although each of these scholars emphasized somewhat their own particular specializations in their courses and books. In 1980, the Austrian philosopher Erich Jantsch wrote The Self-Organizing Universe which viewed history in terms of what he called "process structures". There was an experimental course taught by John Mears at Southern Methodist University in Dallas, Texas, and more formal courses at the university level began to appear.

In 1991 Clive Ponting wrote A Green History of the World: The Environment and the Collapse of Great Civilizations. His analysis did not begin with the Big Bang, but his chapter "Foundations of History" explored the influences of large-scale geological and astronomical forces over a broad time period.

=== David Christian ===
One exponent is David Christian of Macquarie University in Sydney, Australia. He read widely in diverse fields in science, and believed that much was missing from the general study of history. His first university-level course was offered in 1989. He developed a college course beginning with the Big Bang to the present in which he collaborated with numerous colleagues from diverse fields in science and the humanities and the social sciences. This course eventually became a Teaching Company course entitled Big History: The Big Bang, Life on Earth, and the Rise of Humanity, with 24 hours of lectures, which appeared in 2008.

Since the 1990s, other universities began to offer similar courses. In 1994 at the University of Amsterdam and the Eindhoven University of Technology, college courses were offered. In 1996, Fred Spier wrote The Structure of Big History. Spier looked at structured processes which he termed "regimes":

I defined a regime in its most general sense as 'a more or less regular but ultimately unstable pattern that has a certain temporal permanence', a definition which can be applied to human cultures, human and non-human physiology, non-human nature, as well as to organic and inorganic phenomena at all levels of complexity. By defining 'regime' in this way, human cultural regimes thus became a subcategory of regimes in general, and the approach allowed me to look systematically at interactions among different regimes which together produce big history.

— Fred Spier, 2008

Christian's course caught the attention of philanthropist Bill Gates, who discussed with him how to turn Big History into a high school-level course. Gates said about David Christian:

He really blew me away. Here's a guy who's read across the sciences, humanities, and social sciences and brought it together in a single framework. It made me wish that I could have taken big history when I was young, because it would have given me a way to think about all of the school work and reading that followed. In particular, it really put the sciences in an interesting historical context and explained how they apply to a lot of contemporary concerns.

— Bill Gates, in 2012

=== Educational courses ===
By 2002, a dozen college courses on Big History had sprung up around the world. Cynthia Stokes Brown initiated Big History at the Dominican University of California, and she wrote Big History: From the Big Bang to the Present. In 2010, Dominican University of California launched the world's first Big History program to be required of all first-year students, as part of the school's general education track. This program, directed by Mojgan Behmand, includes a one-semester survey of Big History, and an interdisciplinary second-semester course exploring the Big History metanarrative through the lens of a particular discipline or subject. A course description reads:

Welcome to First Year Experience Big History at Dominican University of California. Our program invites you on an immense journey through time, to witness the first moments of our universe, the birth of stars and planets, the formation of life on Earth, the dawn of human consciousness, and the ever-unfolding story of humans as Earth's dominant species. Explore the inevitable question of what it means to be human and our momentous role in shaping possible futures for our planet.

— course description 2012

The Dominican faculty's approach is to synthesize the disparate threads of Big History thought, in order to teach the content, develop critical thinking and writing skills, and prepare students to wrestle with the philosophical implications of the Big History metanarrative. In 2015, University of California Press published Teaching Big History, a comprehensive pedagogical guide for teaching Big History, edited by Richard B. Simon, Mojgan Behmand, and Thomas Burke, and written by the Dominican faculty.

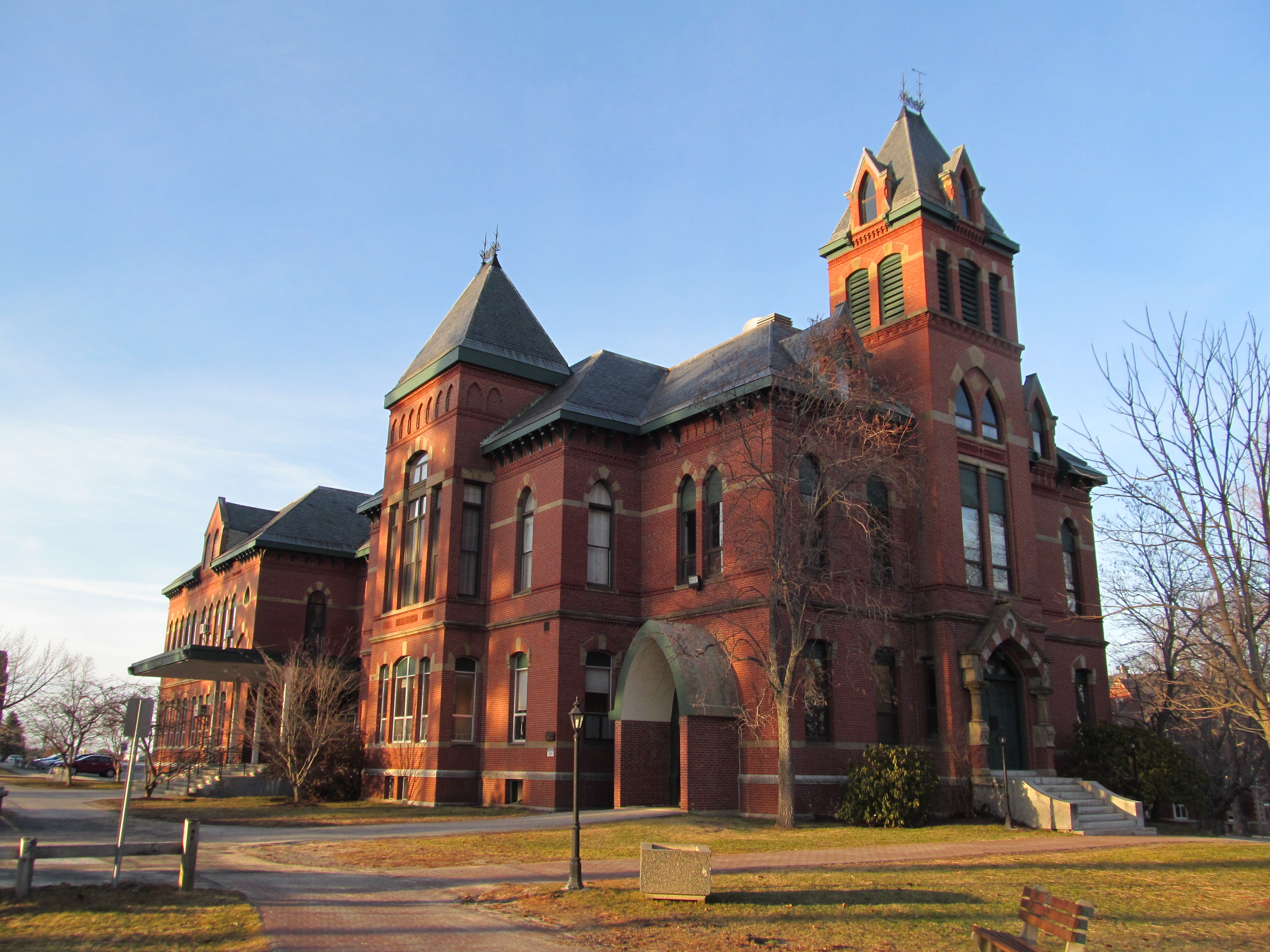
Big History was once taught at the University of Southern Maine.

Barry Rodrigue, at the University of Southern Maine, established the first general education course and the first online version, which has drawn students from around the world. The University of Queensland in Australia previously required all history majors to take an undergraduate big history course entitled Global History, but in 2020 remade the course to remove its big history aspects. The University of Queensland has since taken an active stance against big history, with Associate Professor Ian Hesketh being a world-leading critic. By 2011, 50 professors around the world have offered courses. In 2012, one report suggested that Big History was being practiced as a "coherent form of research and teaching" by hundreds of academics from different disciplines. In 2025 The Bloomsbury Handbook of the Philosophy of the Historical Sciences and Big History was published, consolidating the ideas surrounding the discipline.

In 2008, Christian and his colleagues began developing a course for secondary school students. In 2011, a pilot high school course was taught to 3,000 kids in 50 high schools worldwide. In 2012, there were 87 schools, with 50 in the United States, teaching Big History, with the pilot program set to double in 2013 for students in the ninth and tenth grades, and even in one middle school. The subject is a STEM course at one high school.

There are initiatives to make Big History a required standard course for university students throughout the world. OER Project: Big History, an education project founded by philanthropist Bill Gates from his personal funds, was launched in Australia and the United States, to offer a free online version of the course to high school students.

=== International Big History Association ===
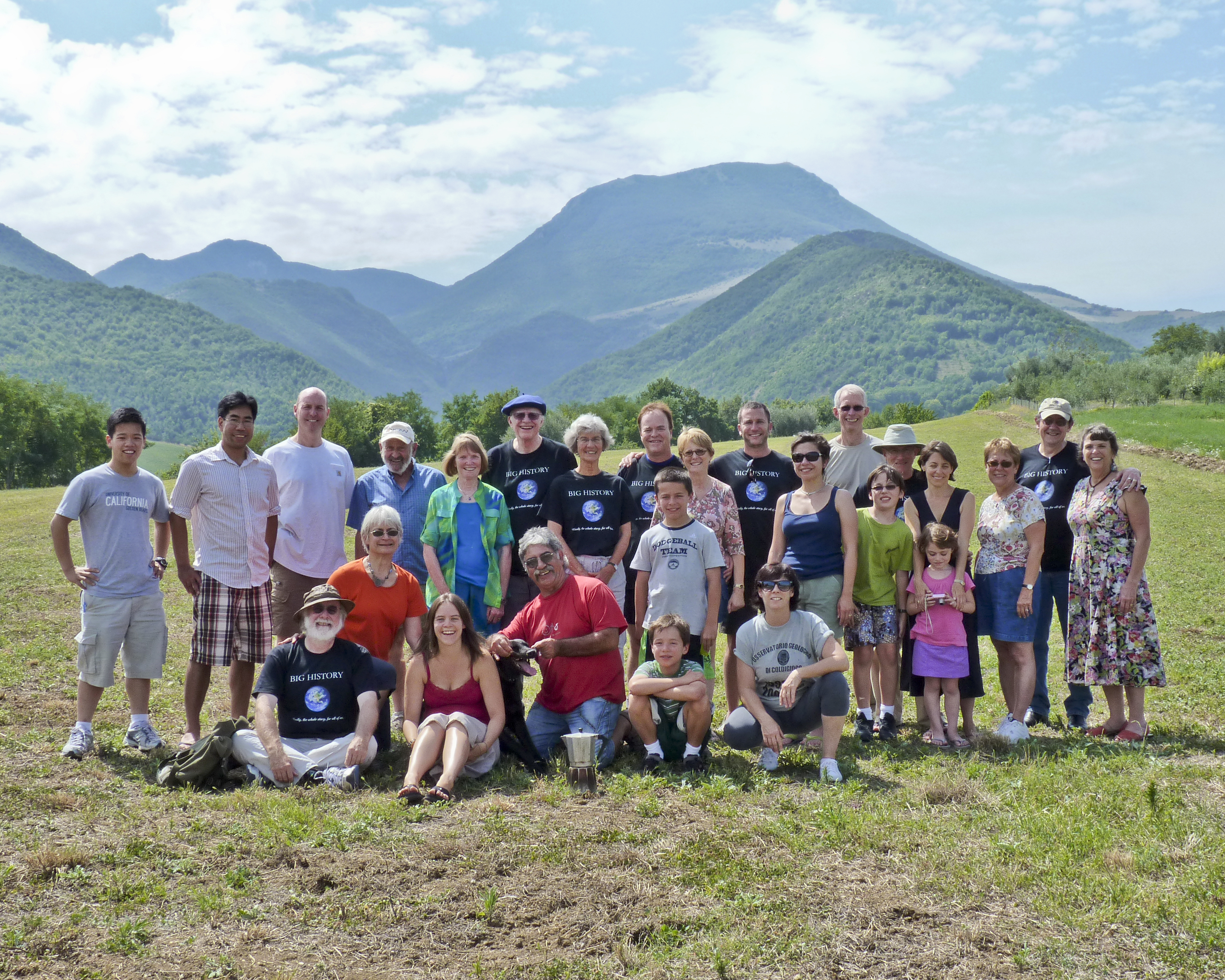
Founding members of the International Big History Association gathered at Coldigioco, Italy in 2010.

The International Big History Association (IBHA) was founded at the Coldigioco Geological Observatory in Coldigioco, Marche, Italy, on 20 August 2010. Its headquarters is located at Grand Valley State University in Allendale, Michigan, United States. Its inaugural gathering in 2012 was described as "big news" in a report in The Huffington Post. The Second IBHA Conference took place in Dominican University of California (San Rafael, CA) on August 6–10, 2014. The Third IBHA Conference was held in University of Amsterdam on 14–17 July 2016. The Fourth Conference ("Big History, Big Future: A Cosmic Perspective") took place in Villanova University (Villanova, PN) on July 26-29, 2018 . The Fifth Conference ("Changing the World: Community, Science and Engagement with Big History") was held in Pune (India) on August 1-5, 2021 .

=== Popularization and contemporary works ===
Yuval Noah Harari's popular books, notably Sapiens: A Brief History of Humankind published in 2011, are said to belong to the genre, with Ian Parker writing in 2020 in The New Yorker that "Harari did not invent Big History, but updated it with hints of self-help and futurology, as well as a high-altitude, almost nihilistic composure about human suffering."

=== People involved ===
Some notable academics involved with the concept include:

- David Christian of Macquarie University, Sydney, Australia
- Eric Chaisson of Harvard University, Cambridge, Massachusetts
- Walter Alvarez of the University of California, Berkeley, California
- Craig Benjamin of Grand Valley State University, Allendale, Michigan
- Cynthia Stokes Brown of Dominican University of California, San Rafael, California
- Andrey Korotayev of the Center for Big History and System Forecasting of the Institute of Oriental Studies of the Russian Academy of Sciences, Moscow, Russia
- Ian Crawford of Birkbeck College London, UK

== See also ==
- Annales school – Group of historians; and in particular the Longue durée concept
- Chronology of the universe
- Clock of the Long Now – Clock designed to keep time for 10,000 years
- Cosmic Calendar
- Deep history – Academic discipline that studies humanity's origins
- Deep time – Time scales on the billions of years
- Deep Time History
- Encyclopedia of Life – Free, online collaborative encyclopedia that documents species
- Hierarchy theory – Means of studying complex ecological systems
- Integrative level – Set of phenomena emerging from pre-existing phenomena
- Scale (analytical tool)
- Timeline of the early universe
- Timeline of the evolutionary history of life
- Timeline of historic inventions
- Timeline of human evolution
- Timeline of human prehistory
- Timeline of natural history
- Timeline of scientific discoveries
- Transdisciplinarity – Research that bridges academic disciplines
