= Eric Chaisson =

American astrophysicist

- Born: October 26, 1946 (age 79); Lowell, Massachusetts, United States
- Education: Harvard University (PhD)
- Occupation: astrophysicist
- Known for: research, teaching, and writing on the interdisciplinary science of cosmic evolution
- Notable work: see Bibliography
- Awards: see Awards

Eric J. Chaisson (pronounced chase-on; born 26 October 1946) is an American astrophysicist known for his research, teaching, and writing on the interdisciplinary science of cosmic evolution. He is a member of the Center for Astrophysics | Harvard & Smithsonian, teaches natural science at Harvard University and is an elected Fellow of the American Association for the Advancement of Science.

He has published nearly 200 peer-reviewed articles in science journals on topics including interstellar clouds and nebulae as well as the supermassive black hole at the center of the Milky Way Galaxy, complexity science utilizing the innovative concept of energy rate density, waste heating effects on climate change, and astrobiology of life in the Universe. He also seeks to unify natural science and works to improve science education nationally and internationally.

== Biography ==
Chaisson was born October 26, 1946 in Lowell, Massachusetts. He graduated in physics from University of Massachusetts Lowell in 1968 and earned his PhD at Harvard University in 1972. He has held professor appointments at the Center for Astrophysics | Harvard & Smithsonian, Johns Hopkins University, Space Telescope Science Institute, and Tufts University, where he was for 20 years director of the Wright Center for Science Education while holding research professorships in the department of physics and in the school of education. He is now back at the Harvard College Observatory where, in semi-retirement, he teaches one course each year and works with colleagues at the allied Smithsonian Astrophysical Observatory.

He was commissioned an officer in the U.S. Air Force at Lackland Air Force Base in 1970, served on active duty and in the reserves mainly at Mildenhall RAF base and Hanscom USAF base until 1986, after which he was honorably discharged at the rank of captain. He took leave from academia in 1986 at MIT Lincoln Laboratory as staff physicist working on ballistic missile defense amidst occasional consulting and advising for many years with the military-intelligence community. He spent sabbaticals in the 1980s at Wellesley and Haverford colleges, in 1996 was visiting scholar and national lecturer for Phi Beta Kappa, and in 2018 worked on solar energy as visiting professor at University of Notre Dame and Distinguished Fellow at its Institute for Advanced Study.

== Awards ==
Chaisson’s research and writing have won several awards, such as the 1977 B.J. Bok Prize for “original radio-astronomy discoveries,” the 1980 Smith-Weld Prize for “best article by a Harvard faculty member,” a 1990 (and 1994) certificate of recognition from NASA with U.S. flag flown aboard the Space Shuttle-31 mission for “exceptional performance on the Hubble Space Telescope program,” as well as unsought fellowships from the Sloan Foundation and the National Academy of Sciences.

His 2018 election to the rank of AAAS Fellow noted his "research and teaching contributions to astrophysics, including co-authoring the nation's most widely used astronomy textbook." He was also a finalist nominee for the 2024 Smithsonian Secretary's national Achievement Award for "consistent and outstanding performance in educational programming that opens doors to lifelong learners, communities and educators elsewhere while serving the nation through distance learning, digital media, publications and exhibitions.”

His book Cosmic Dawn in 1982 received the Phi Beta Kappa Award in Science, the Science Writing Award of the American Institute of Physics and was a finalist for the National Book Award for Nonfiction. The Hubble Wars in 1995 also won the AIP’s Science Writing Award and was hailed in the New York Times as perhaps "the most readable and instructive book on the doing of science since James Watson wrote The Double Helix." Epic of Evolution won the 2007 Kistler Book Award “for “increasing understanding of factors shaping the future of humanity.” And his textbook, Astronomy: The Universe at a Glance, won the Most Innovative New Textbook award in 2016 from the Textbook Authors Association.

In the 1990s, he co-produced and hosted the educational PBS (Maryland Intec) television series, Starfinder, highlighting Hubble Space Telescope discoveries and people, now freely available online at the American Archive of Public Broadcasting. For 20 years, he hosted the annual Wright Lectures on Cosmic Evolution at the Boston Museum of Science, in conjunction with the annual Wright Colloquia at the Piaget Center, Geneva, Switzerland.

== Bibliography ==
- Cosmic Dawn: The Origins of Matter and Life (in 9 foreign languages), Atlantic Monthly Press, 1981
- The Invisible Universe: Probing Frontiers of Astrophysics (co-authored with G. Field; in 4 languages), Birkhauser, 1985
- The Life Era: Cosmic Selection and Conscious Evolution, Atlantic Monthly Press, 1987
- Relatively Speaking: Black Holes, Relativity, and Fate of the Universe (in 5 languages), Norton, 1988
- Universe: An Evolutionary Approach to Astronomy, Prentice-Hall, 1988
- Astronomy Today (co-authored with S. McMillan), Pearson, 9 editions, 1993-2018
- Astronomy: A Beginner’s Guide, (co-authored with S. McMillan), Pearson, 8 editions, 1995-2017
- The Hubble Wars: Astrophysics Meets Astropolitics . . ., HarperCollins, 1994
- The 13th Labor: Improving Science Education (co-edited with T-C. Kim), Gordon&Breach, 1999
- Cosmic Evolution: The Rise of Complexity in Nature (in several languages), Harvard University Press, 2001
- Epic of Evolution: Seven Ages of the Cosmos (in 7 languages), Columbia University Press, 2006
- Astronomy: The Universe at a Glance (co-authored with S. McMillan), Pearson, 2016

== See also ==
- Big History
- Epic of Evolution
