= David Christian (historian) =

British American historian

- Born: David Gilbert Christian; December 8, 1946 (age 79); New York, N.Y. USA
- Occupation: Historian
- Awards: World History Association; Book Prize Maps of Time (2005)

Academic background
- Education: Oxford University; B.A., D. Phil (1974); University of Western Ontario; M.A.
- Alma mater: Oxford University
- Influences: William H. McNeill

Academic work
- Discipline: History
- Sub-discipline: Big History; History of Russia
- Institutions: Macquarie University in Sydney; San Diego State University
- Notable works: Maps of Time
- Notable ideas: Pioneering the field of Big History
- Website: https://researchers.mq.edu.au/en/persons/david-christian

David Gilbert Christian (born June 30, 1946) is a historian and scholar of Russian history. He has become notable for teaching and promoting the emerging discipline of Big History. In 1989 he began teaching the first course on the topic, examining history from the Big Bang to the present using a multidisciplinary approach with the assistance of scholars in diverse specializations from the sciences, social sciences, and humanities. Big History frames human history in terms of cosmic, geological, and biological history. Christian is credited with coining the term Big History and he serves as president of the International Big History Association. Christian's best-selling Teaching Company course entitled Big History caught the attention of philanthropist Bill Gates, who is funding Christian's efforts to develop a program to bring the course to secondary-school students worldwide.

== Early life ==
Christian was born in Brooklyn, New York, to British and American parents. He grew up in Nigeria and England. He completed his pre-university education at Atlantic College, an international sixth form in Wales. He then earned his B.A. from Oxford University, an M.A. in Russian history from the University of Western Ontario, and a Ph.D. in nineteenth century Russian history from Oxford University in 1974.

== Academic career ==
Christian's early research interests focused on the history of Russia and the Soviet Union, with particular emphases on the Russian peasantry, including their diet and the role of vodka in their lives. He published several books on these subjects. In 1984, he co-wrote, along with R. E. F. Smith, a history about the Russian peasantry entitled Bread and Salt that showed, among other things, how such foods along with dairy products were used as seasonings. He taught at Macquarie University in Sydney from 1975 to 2000.

During the 1980s, he read widely and began a program to describe human history in the context of very large time scales from cosmology and astronomy, covering the almost fourteen billion years since the Big Bang. He began teaching his first course, what he described as Big History, in 1989. It was a novel approach that emphasizes summary findings from biology, cosmology, astronomy, geology, and anthropology to show what happened before homo sapiens became prevalent on the Earth. Generally, humans are not mentioned much in the course until halfway through the 15-week semester. He wrote the book Maps of Time that mirrored the course content. The course was chosen by The Teaching Company's Great Courses and Christian recorded 48 half-hour lectures.

In 1998 he published A History of Russia, Central Asia and Mongolia in which he studied the steppe and forest peoples of Inner Eurasia as opposed to 'outer Eurasia' – the crescent of agrarian civilizations from Europe, the Middle East, and India to China.

Christian transferred to San Diego State University in California in 2001. He taught students in subjects such as world history and the history of the environment, as well as the history of Inner Eurasia. In 2005, his 600-page book Maps of Time was published, which a reviewer described as a "remarkable work of synthesis and scholarship." Christian has additional teaching affiliations with the University of Vermont and Ewha Womans University in Seoul. In 2009, he transferred back to Macquarie University.

In 2010, Christian predicted that historical scholarship would have less emphasis on document-based research and more on empirical research, and he wrote:

...Over the next fifty years we will see a return of the ancient tradition of "universal history"; but this will be a new form of universal history that is global in its practice and scientific in its spirit and methods.

— David Christian in History and Theory, 2010

Philanthropist Bill Gates presented David Christian at the TED 2011 Conference in Long Beach, California. At that time, Christian announced his Big History Project initiative to teach the subject to secondary school students in Australia and the United States. Currently, he is serving as president of the International Big History Association.

== Awards and honors ==
- 1999: Fellow of the Australian Academy of the Humanities
- 2005: World History Association Book Prize, Maps of Time
- 2014: Distinguished Professor, Macquarie University

== Publications ==
- Bread and Salt: A Social and Economic History of Food and Drink in Russia, 1984, co-written with R. E. F. Smith
- A History of Russia, Central Asia and Mongolia, volume 1, 1998
- Maps of Time: An Introduction to Big History, 2005, University of California Press
- Big History: Between Nothing and Everything, first edition, 2014, McGraw-Hill Education (co-written by Cynthia Stokes Brown and Craig Benjamin)
- Origin Story: A Big History of Everything, 2018, Little, Brown and Company, ISBN 9780316392006
- "Future Stories: What's Next", 2022, Little, Brown Spark.

== See also ==
- Big History Project
