= OER Project =

Project for global teaching of Big History

OER Project is a non-profit open educational resources provider co-founded in 2011 by Bill Gates and David Christian. Originally known as Big History Project (BHP), the titular course was intended to enable the global teaching of the subject of Big History, which has been described as "the attempt to understand, in a unified way, the history of Cosmos, Earth, Life and Humanity." The company rebranded as OER Project in 2019 and now offers World History Project, Climate Project, and other courses in addition to the original BHP curriculum.

== History of OER Project ==
Bill Gates became interested in the topic when he heard "Big History: The Big Bang, Life on Earth, and the Rise of Humanity," a 48-lecture course taught by David Christian and published by The Teaching Company. For Gates, "he [Christian] really blew me away. Here's a guy who's read across the sciences, humanities, and social sciences and brought it together in a single framework. It made me wish that I could have taken big history when I was young, because it would have given me a way to think about all of the school work and reading that followed. In particular, it really put the sciences in an interesting historical context and explained how they apply to a lot of contemporary concerns."

After Gates and Christian met to discuss the lectures, the genesis of the Big History Project occurred. They founded the project, and developed a team to achieve their stated goal, "to get Big History taught to as many students around the world as possible".

Big History Project was launched at the 2011 TED conference at Long Beach, California on 2 March 2011. David Christian presented an 18-minute lecture outlining big history and the intention of creating a global online delivery of a classroom-tested course aimed at 9th grade students. His presentation was part of the Bill Gates-curated "Knowledge Revolution" section of the conference.

In 2019, BHP launched a second course, World History Project (WHP), and announced that the organization had rebranded as OER Project to reflect their expanded catalogue. OER Project has subsequently added a variety of history and climate education courses and announced in 2022 that over one million students had accessed its materials during its first decade in operation.

== Project team ==
BHP's initial academic advisers were:

1. Bob Bain, Associate Professor at the University of Michigan, Ann Arbor
2. Marnie Hughes-Warrington (Pro-Vice Chancellor, Monash University, Melbourne)
3. Tracy Sullivan (Director of the Australian History Museum at Macquarie University, Sydney)
4. Sal Khan (founder and executive director of the Khan Academy).

Bain and Trevor Getz (San Francisco State University) are OER Project's current academic leads, and the advisory board now comprises more than 20 predominantly US-based academics and educators.

== Initial pilot program ==
Prior to launch, seven schools were selected for the initial classroom pilot phase of the project. In the United States, San Diego High School of International Studies (California); The Rivers School (Massachusetts); Northville High School (Michigan); Greenhills High School (Michigan) and Lakeside School (Washington) taught Big History Project in the 2011/12 school year. In Australia, Narara Valley High School in New South Wales and Nossal High School in Victoria taught the course in their 2012 school year.
