= Ian Willcock =

British composer

- Born: 1959 (age 66–67)
- Education: Sackville School, East Grinstead; Middlesex Polytechnic; King's College London; De Montfort University
- Genre: Digital
- Occupations: Composer; academic
- Website: www.willcock.org

Ian Willcock (born 1959) is a British composer and academic, especially in digital media.

Willcock was educated at Sackville School, East Grinstead (1970–1978), Middlesex Polytechnic (1979–1982), gaining a BA Hons degree in Performance Arts with music as a major, and King's College London (1982–1984), gaining an MMus in composition and studying with the Australian composer David Lumsdaine. Later, he was awarded a PhD degree in Multimedia and Live Performance by De Montfort University in 2012, supervised by Andrew Hugill, Hussein Zedan, and Bret Battey.

Wilcock has received international prizes, commissions, and scholarships, including a residency at the Akademie Schloß Solitude (Germany), the PRS Composition Award (UK), Schrenslompen (commission, City of Amsterdam), Finding the Voice (Les Percussions de Strasbourg, France) and inclusion in the 2006 Not Still Art (NSA) Festival (New York). In 2001, German National Radio broadcast a 45-minute programme about his work.

His compositions include:

- The Book of Density
- A Book of Maps
- A Catalogue of Targets
- Cruelties: A Catalogue of Grotesque Events
- The Committee Holds up a Mirror
- Eye, Survey The World
- Finding the Voice
- For The Republic
- Here's Looking at You
- I Memory
- In the Shadow of Ancient Music
- Miners
- Modulor
- Persistence
- The Persistence of Melody
- Quartet: In Praise of Action
- The Resistance of Water
- Schon...
- Snare
- Start!
- Towards the Inside
- Walked Once, And Now Does Not Walk

In 2000, Willcock became a Lecturer in Multimedia within the Visual Arts department at Westminster Kingsway College. In 2009, he was appointed as a Senior Lecturer in Multimedia and the Programme Leader of the BA (Hons) Multimedia Design degree at the University of Hertfordshire. In 2010, he became Programme Leader of the Postgraduate Media programme. In 2013, he was appointed Principal Lecturer and Postgraduate Coordinator for all taught postgraduate programmes in the School of Creative Arts at the university. He is the general chair of the annual EVA London Conference.
