= Katherine Joy =

Earth scientist

Katherine Joy FRAS
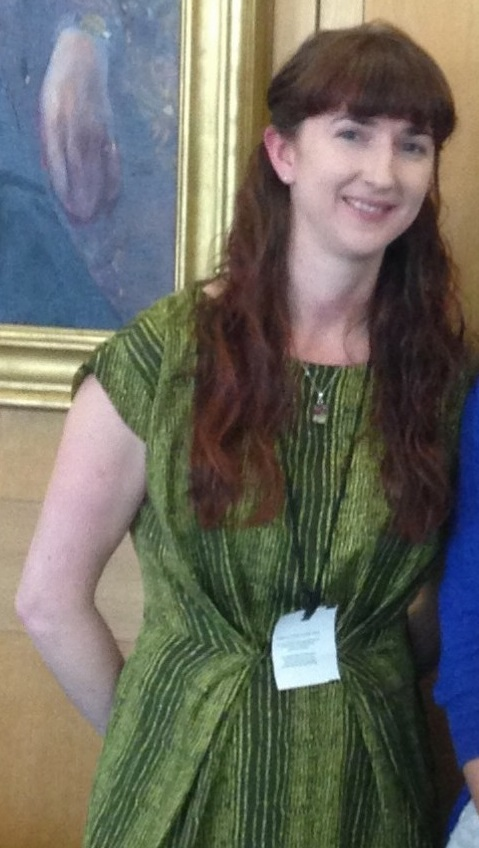
- Joy attending Parliamentary Update in 2014
- Born: Katherine Helen Joy
- Other name: Katie Joy
- Education: Sackville College
- Alma mater: Royal Holloway, University of London (BSc); University College London (PhD)
- Awards: Royal Society University Research Fellowship (2015)
- Scientific career
- Fields: Meteorites; Lunar science
- Institutions: University of Manchester; NASA Lunar Science Institute; Birkbeck, University of London
- Thesis: Studies in lunar geology and geochemistry using sample analysis and remote sensing measurements (2007)
- Doctoral advisor: Ian Crawford
- Website: www.research.manchester.ac.uk/portal/katherine.joy.html

Katherine Helen Joy FRAS is a professor in Earth Sciences at the University of Manchester. Joy has studied lunar samples from the Apollo program as part of her research on meteorites and lunar science.

== Early life and education ==
Joy was educated at Sackville School, East Grinstead, and studied geology at Royal Holloway, University of London, where she graduated with first class honours in 2003. Joy was a doctoral student at University College London, working on the evolution of the Moon, supervised by Ian Crawford. Her work considered sample analysis and remote sensing. She held a joint position at the Natural History Museum, London. She was part of the European Space Agency (ESA) SMART-1 mission. In 2006, Joy joined Birkbeck, University of London, where she used the Demonstration of a Compact Imaging X-ray Spectrometer (D-CIXS) instrument, part of the SMART-1 mission, to study X-ray fluorescence from lunar samples. D-CIXS was designed by the Rutherford Appleton Laboratory (RAL) and could measure elemental abundances of magnesium, aluminium and silicon. Her work has used data from the Mercury Imaging X-ray Spectrometer (MIXS) on the BepiColombo Mercury Planetary Orbiter (MPO).

== Research and career ==
In 2007 Joy was appointed a postdoctoral research fellow at Birkbeck, where she performed mineralogical and geochemical investigations into lunar rock and used this to understand chemical information collected from remote sensing.

In 2010 Joy joined the Johnson Space Center as a NASA Lunar Science Institute research fellow working on lunar regolith. By investigating the composition of lunar soil Joy hopes to understand the Moon's bombardment history. While in the United States Joy was a member of the Center for Lunar Science and Exploration. She moved to the Antarctic search for meteorites (ANSMET) in 2011, where she spent three months searching for lunar meteorites in the Miller Range in Antarctica. The Antarctic is well suited to the identification of meteorites; it is cold enough to preserve them but white enough for the dark meteorites to stand out. She led the first UK team to recover meteorite samples from Antarctica in collaboration with the British Antarctic Survey (BAS); the Polar Meteorite Exploration and Research programme. Over the course of four weeks, Joy's mission collected almost forty lunar meteorites from the ice. One of the 4.3 billion year old meteorites studied by Joy contained evidence of active volcanoes on Mars, a surprising finding that indicated volcanic activity started hundreds of millions of years before it had previously been estimated.

Joy has studied the 382 kg of lunar rocks that were brought back from the Apollo missions. She believes that lunar rocks will hold answers to whether life exists beyond the Solar System. Joy has called for future generation of space craft to be more careful about where they collect rocks. She found fragments of ancient asteroids in the rocks brought back by the Apollo 16 mission, which indicates that primitive asteroids regularly bombarded the Moon over 3.4 billion years ago. Joy joined the University of Manchester in 2012, where she was awarded a Royal Society University Research Fellowship (URF) to study lunar meteorites. She is a member of the European Space Agency Package for Resource Observation and in-Situ Prospecting for Exploration, Commercial exploitation and Transportation (PROSPECT) drill – the Sample Excavation and Extraction Device.

=== Public engagement ===
Joy has been involved with the development of Our Earth: Its Climate, History, and Processes, a University of Manchester programme available on Coursera that covers the formation of the Moon and importance of the Moon on Earth. In 2019 Joy appeared on The Life Scientific. She has written for The Conversation and appeared on The Sky at Night and at the Bluedot Festival.

=== Selected publications ===
Her publications include:

- A petrological, mineralogical, and chemical analysis of the lunar mare basalt meteorite La Paz Icefield 02205, 02224, and 02226
- The petrology and geochemistry of Miller Range 05035: A new lunar gabbroic meteorite
- Direct detection of projectile relics from the end of the lunar basin–forming epoch
