= Cynthia Stokes Brown =

American educator and historian (1938–2017)

Cynthia Stokes Brown (March 20, 1938 – October 15, 2017) was an American educator and historian.

== Background ==
She earned her BA at Duke University in history (summa cum laude) and her M.A.T. and Ph.D. from Johns Hopkins University in the history of education with fellowships from the American Association of University Women and the Woodrow Wilson National Fellowship Foundation. After teaching tenth-grade world history for two years and living in northeast Brazil for two years with the Peace Corps, Brown directed the single-subject credential program at Dominican University of California at San Rafael from 1982 to 1992. She taught full-time in both the history and education departments until 2001, when she retired from full-time teaching to write Big History: From the Big Bang to the Present. Using the term Big History, coined by David Christian at Macquarie University in Sydney, Australia, Brown told the whole story from the Big Bang to the present in simple, non-academic language to convey our common humanity and our connection to every other part of the natural world. Teaching part-time after 2001, Brown pioneered the teaching of Big History at Dominican University of California, where it is now a required course for every incoming freshman. She served as a founding board member of the International Big History Association (IBHA). Brown died of pancreatic cancer on October 15, 2017, at her home Berkeley, California, surrounded by family.

Brown was an American Book Award recipient in 1987 for Ready From Within: Septima Clark and the Civil Rights Movement.

== Writings ==
- Big History, Small World: From the Big Bang to You. Great Barrington, MA: Berkshire Publishing Group, 2017.
- Refusing Racism: White Allies and the Struggle for Civil Rights. New York: Teachers College Press, 2001.
- Connecting With the Past: History Workshop in Middle and High Schools. Portsmouth, NH: Heinemann, 1994.
- Like It Was: A Complete Guide to Writing Oral History. New York: Teachers and Writers Collaborative, 1988.
- Ready From Within: Septima Clark and the Civil Rights Movement. Navarro, CA: Wild Trees Press, 1986. (American Book Award, 1987); re-issued by Africa World Press, 1990.
- Literacy in 30 Hours: Paulo Freire's Process in Northeast Brazil. London: Writers and Readers Publishing Cooperative, 1975.
- Article: "What Is a Civilization, Anyway?"
- Journey of the Universe
