= Foster care in the United Kingdom =

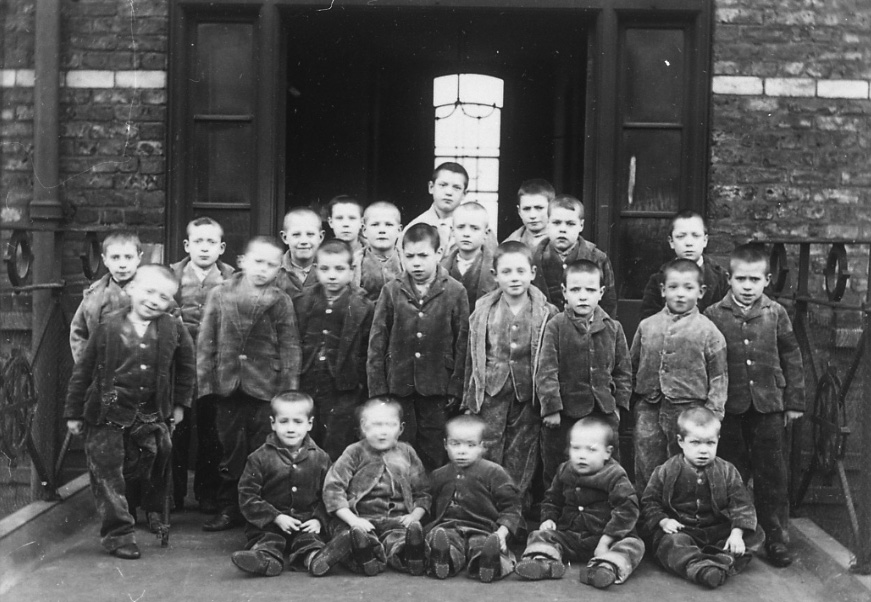
Children from a workhouse in Cheshire - similar to these children at Crumpsall workhouse.(c.1895) - were the first to be placed in foster care in the United Kingdom in 1853.

Foster care in the modern sense was first introduced in the United Kingdom in 1853 when Reverend John Armistead removed children from a workhouse in Cheshire, and placed them with foster families. The local council (called unions at the time) was legally responsible for the children, and paid the foster parents a sum equal to the cost of maintaining the child in the workhouse.

In the UK, there are nearly 70,000 children living with foster families each day. This is almost three-quarters of the total number of children in care away from home, which is over 98,000. Prospective foster parents must pass an assessment by a social worker to determine suitability to foster. Those who pass are then paid a fostering allowance, which consists of a professional fee for the carer and the funds to cover the needs of the child.

According to the Children and Family Court Advisory and Support Service – the agency for England set up to safeguard and promote the welfare of children involved in family court proceedings – the total number of new care applications reached 14,599 between April 2016 and March 2017 but has fallen in each of the eight years since then. Between April 2024 and March 2025 there were 11,430 new care applications, which was 0.4% lower than in the previous financial year.

Foster care arrangements last until a young person in local authority care reaches the age of 18. Under the Children and Families Act 2014 local authorities in England are required to facilitate, monitor and support ‘staying put’ arrangements for fostered young people to remain with a foster family until the age of 21, if both parties agree to this and provided the council thinks this does not pose a risk of their welfare. An evaluation by the Centre for Homelessness Impact of the impact of staying put arrangements of the risk of homelessness among care leavers, published in 2024, found consistent and strong evidence that these significantly lower the risk of homelessness for care leavers.

== Recent controversies ==
Proceedings to place children in foster care have increased since 2007 in Britain. The death of 17-month-old Peter Connelly, known as "Baby P", a 17-month-old British boy who died in London after suffering more than 50 injuries over an eight-month period during which he was seen many times by Haringey Children's services and National Health Service health professionals, led to widespread public reaction. Care applications surpassed the 10,000 yearly mark in England for the first time in 2012. For the year to 31 March 2015, the number had risen to 12,791, an increase of 15% on the previous year.

In Nottinghamshire a former foster father was convicted in 2010 of raping and sexually abusing vulnerable boys for more than a decade.

For the purposes of the Employment Relations Act 1999, the Employment Tribunal ruled in February 2010 that a foster carer is not a contractual worker. The Employment Appeals Tribunal ("EAT") upheld the ruling, following earlier rulings that there is a statutory scheme which requires a foster carer and their local authority to enter into a fostering agreement, and this means that there cannot be a contract, "freely entered into" between them. The EAT therefore confirmed that a foster carer has no right to trade union representation when a Fostering Panel is reviewing their status as a carer. However, a foster parent does have the right to terminate the placement of a child with them by providing 28 days' notice.
