= List of acronyms: I =

This list contains acronyms, initialisms, and pseudo-blends that begin with the letter I.

For the purposes of this list:

- acronym = an abbreviation pronounced as if it were a word, e.g., SARS = severe acute respiratory syndrome, pronounced to rhyme with cars
- initialism = an abbreviation pronounced wholly or partly using the names of its constituent letters, e.g., CD = compact disc, pronounced cee dee
- pseudo-blend = an abbreviation whose extra or omitted letters mean that it cannot stand as a true acronym, initialism, or portmanteau (a word formed by combining two or more words).

(a) = acronym, e.g.: SARS – (a) severe acute respiratory syndrome
(i) = initialism, e.g.: CD – (i) compact disc
(p) = pseudo-blend, e.g.: UNIFEM – (p) United Nations Development Fund for Women
(s) = symbol (none of the above, representing and pronounced as something else; for example: MHz – megahertz)

Some terms are spoken as either acronym or initialism, e.g., VoIP, pronounced both as voyp and V-O-I-P.

(Main list of acronyms)

- I – (s) Iodine – One (in Roman numerals)

== I0–9 ==
- I^{2}C or I-squared-C - (i) Inter-Integrated Circuit
- I2WD or I^{2}WD – (i) U.S. Intelligence and Information Warfare Directorate (CERDEC)

== IA ==
- ia – (s) Interlingua language (ISO 639-1 code)
- IA – (s) Iowa (postal symbol)
- IAAF – (i) International Association of Athletics Federations ("International Amateur Athletics Federation" from 1912 to 2001; renamed "World Athletics" in 2019)
- IAAL – (i) I Am A Lawyer
- IAAS - (p) Infrastructure-as-a-Service
- IAB –
  - (i) International Association for Biologicals
  - IATA code of McConnell Air Force Base
- IACREOT – (i) International Association of Clerks, Recorders, Election Officials, and Treasurers
- IAD –
  - (i) Ion Assisted Deposition
  - IATA code for Washington Dulles International Airport
- IADS – (i) Integrated Air Defence System
- IAE - (i) International Aero Engines (aircraft engine joint venture)
- IAEA – (i) International Atomic Energy Agency
- IAF
  - {i} Industrial Areas Foundation
  - (i) Israeli Air Force
- IAFG – (i) Information Assurance Focus Group
- IAI –
  - (i) International African Institute
  - Israel Aircraft Industries
- IANA – (i) Internet Assigned Numbers Authority
- IANAL – (i) I Am Not A Lawyer
- IAPD
  - International Associates of Paediatric(sic) Dentistry
  - (i) Investment Adviser Public Disclosure
  - iShares Asia Pacific Dividend
- IAQ – (i) Indoor air quality – Infrequently Asked Questions
- IAS – (i) Image Assessment System
- IASIP – (i) It's Always Sunny in Philadelphia
- IATA – (a/i) International Air Transport Association
- IATF – International Automotive Task Force
- IATSE – International Alliance of Theatrical Stage Employees
- IAU – (i) International Association of Universities – International Astronomical Union
- IAUC – (i) International Astronomical Union Circular
- IAW – (i) In Accordance With

== IB ==
- IB – (i) International Baccalaureate
- IBA – (i) Important Bird Area
- IBD – (i) Inflammatory Bowel Disease
- IBDM – (i) Information Based Decision Making
- IBDS – (i) Integrated Biological Detection System – International Business Development Specialist
- IBF - International Boxing Federation
- IBGe – (i) Isobutylgermane
- IBGE – (i) Instituto Brasileiro de Geografia e Estatística (Portuguese, "Brazilian Institute of Geography and Statistics")
- IBHOF - International Boxing Hall of Fame
- IBM – (i) International Business Machines
- ibo – (s) Igbo language (ISO 639-2 code)
- IBRD – (i) International Bank for Reconstruction and Development (part of the World Bank)
- IBS – (i) Irritable Bowel Syndrome

== IC ==
- IC
  - (s) Ice Crystals (METAR Code)
  - Iceland (FIPS 10-4 country code)
  - (i) Integrated Circuit - [inner circle]
- ICANN – (a) Internet Corporation for Assigned Names and Numbers
- ICAO – (i) International Civil Aviation Organization
- ICBM – (i) Intercontinental Ballistic Missile
- ICBM – I see (phonetically "c") BatMan
- ICBN – (i) International Code of Botanical Nomenclature
- ICC
  - (i) Integrated Command and Control
  - International Criminal Court
  - International Cricket Council
  - Interstate Commerce Commission
  - International Chamber of Commerce
- ICD
  - (i) Implantable Cardioverter-Defibrillator
  - Initial Capabilities Document
  - International Classification of Diseases
- ICE
  - (i/a) (U.S.) Immigration and Customs Enforcement
  - In case of emergency
  - Internal Combustion Engine (Vehicles)
- ICES – (a/i) International Council for the Exploration of the Sea
- ICF – (i) Intelligent Community Forum
- ICHTHYS – (a) Iesous Christos, Theou Yios, Soter (Greek, "Jesus Christ, Son of God, Savior")
- ICM
  - (i) Improved Conventional Munition
  - Integrated Collection Management
  - International Congress of Mathematicians
  - Iraq Campaign Medal
- ICMP – (i) Internet Control Message Protocol
- ICNAF – (i) International Commission for the Northwest Atlantic Fisheries (became NAFO in 1978)
- ICNI – (i) Integrated Communication, Navigation, and Identification
- ICO – (i) Intermediate Circular Orbit
- ICP
  - (i) Inductively coupled plasma
  - Insane Clown Posse
- ICPE – (a/i) International Conference on Pharmacoepidemiology, the annual conference of the International Society for Pharmacoepidemiology
- ICRAF – (i) International Centre for Research in Agroforestry (a.k.a. World Agroforestry Centre since 2002)
- ICRISAT – (i/a) International Crops Research Institute for the Semi-Arid Tropics
- ICRL – (i) Individual Component Repair List
- ICRS – (i) International Celestial Reference System
- ICS
  - (i) In-Country Support
  - Intelligence and Communications Systems
  - Interim Contractor Support
- ICSI – (p) Intracytoplasmic Sperm Injection
- ICT – (i) Information and communication technologies
- ICTH – (i) Island Closest to Heaven/Hell Final Fantasy VIII
- ICV – (i) Infantry Carrier Vehicle
- ICW
  - (i) In Co-ordination With
  - Indonesia Corruption Watch
  - Infectious and Chemotherapeutic Waste
  - Insulating Concrete Wall
  - Integral Crystalline Waterproofing
  - (p) Interactive Courseware
  - (i) International Championship Wrestling (defunct US professional wrestling promotion)
- ICYMI – (i) In Case You Missed It
- ICZN
  - (i) International Code of Zoological Nomenclature
  - International Commission on Zoological Nomenclature

== ID ==
- id – (s) Indonesian language (ISO 639-1 code)
- ID
  - (s) Idaho (postal symbol)
  - (p) Identity
  - (s) Indonesia (FIPS 10-4 country code; ISO 3166 digram)
  - (i) Infantry Division
  - Intelligent Design
- ID10T Error – (i) Idiot User Error (IT help desk inside joke)
- IDA
  - (i) U.S. Institute for Defense Analyses
  - International Development Association (part of the World Bank
- IDC – (i)
  - International Data Corporation
  - "I Don't Care"
- IDDI – (i) I don't do initialisms (see irony)
- IDE
  - (i) Integrated Development Environment
  - Integrated Drive Electronics
- IDeA – (a) Improvement and Development Agency, the former name of Local Government Improvement and Development in the United Kingdom
- IDEA
  - (a) Individuals with Disabilities Education Act (U.S.)
  - International Data Encryption Algorithm
  - International Design Excellence Awards
- IDF
  - (i) Israel Defense Forces
  - Intel Development Forum
  - International Dairy Federation
- IDGAF – (i) I don't give a f**k
- IDK – (i) I don't know
- IDKIBTI – I don't know, I'm black, that's it
- IDL – (i) Interface Definition Language
- IDN – (s) Indonesia (ISO 3166 trigram)
- ido – (s) Ido language (ISO 639-2 code)
- IDR – (s) Indonesian rupiah (ISO 4217 currency code)
- IDTS – (i) I don't think so

== IE ==
- i.e. – (i) id est (Latin, roughly "that is")
- ie – (s) Interlingue language (ISO 639-1 code)
- IE – (i) Indo-European languages – Internet Explorer – (s) Ireland (ISO 3166 digram) – Iced Earth
- IEA – (i) International Energy Agency
- IEC – (i) International Electrotechnical Commission
- IED – (i) Improvised Explosive Device
- IEEE – (p) Institute of Electrical and Electronics Engineers ("I triple-E")
- IELTS – (a) International English Language Testing System
- IER – (i) Information Exchange Requirement
- IET – (i) Institution of Engineering and Technology
- IET – (ii) Initial Entry Training
- IETF – (i) Internet Engineering Task Force
- IEW – (i) Intelligence and Electronic Warfare

== IF ==
- IFAB – (i) International Football Association Board
- IFAH – (i) International Federation for Animal Health
- IFAP – (i) International Federation of Agricultural Producers, (i) International Fashion Academy Pakistan
- IFC – (i) International Finance Corporation (part of the World Bank) – (a) Independent Film Channel
- IFF – (i) Identification, Friend or Foe – Individually Fresh Frozen – International Flavors and Fragrances
- IFFN – (i) Identification, Friend, Foe, or Neutral
- IFO – (i) Identified Flying Object (see also UFO)
- IFOR – (p) UN Implementation Force – (i) Institute for Operations Research – International Fellowship of Reconciliation
- IFOV – (i) Instantaneous Field of View
- IFPI – (i) International Federation of Phonographic Industries
- IFR – (i) Instrument Flight Rules
- IFRB – (i) International Frequency Registration Board
- IFV – (i) Infantry Fighting Vehicle

== IG ==
- ig – (s) Igbo language (ISO 639-1 code)
- IG –
  - (i) Inspector General
  - Instagram
- IGFA – International Game Fish Association
- IGM - IATA code for Kingman Airport
- IGNOU – (a) Indira Gandhi National Open University
- IGS – (i) International Ground Station
- IGY – (i) Israeli Gay Youth – International Geophysical Year

== IH ==
- IHÉS – (i) Institut des Hautes Études Scientifiques (French, Institute of Advanced Scientific Studies)
- IHH – (i) Idiopathic Hypogonadotropic Hypogonadism
- IHO – (i/a) International Hydrographic Organization
- IHOP – (i/a) International House of Pancakes, the original name of this American restaurant chain ("EYE-hop")
- IHR – (i) Institute for Historical Review
- IHSI – Institutum Historicum Societatis Iesu (Jesuit Historical Institute)

== II ==
- ii – (s) Sichuan Yi language (ISO 639-1 code)
- II – (s) Two (in Roman numerals)
- IIC or I^{2}C - (i) Inter-Integrated Circuit
- IICA – (i) Inter-American Institute for Cooperation on Agriculture
- IIE – (i) Innovative Interstellar Explorer
- iii – (s) Sichuan Yi language (ISO 639-2 code)
- III – (s) Three (in Roman numerals)
- IIMSS – If I May Say So
- IIRC – If I Remember Correctly, If I Recall Correctly
- IISS – (i) International Institute for Strategic Studies
- IIT – (i) Illinois Institute of Technology – Indian Institutes of Technology – Indiana Institute of Technology
- IITM – (i) Image Institute of Technology & Management – Indian Institute of Technology Madras – Indian Institute of Tropical Meteorology
- I/ITSEC – (a) Interservice/Industry Training, Simulation and Education Conference ("eye-it-sec" or "it-sec")

== IJ ==
- IJN – (i) Imperial Japanese Navy (World War II)
- IJWP – (i) Interim Joint Warfare Publication

== IK ==
- ik – (s) Inupiaq language (ISO 639-1 code)
- IKEA – (a) Ingvar Kamprad (the company's founder), Elmtaryd (the farm where he was born and raised), Agunnaryd (a village and parish near the farm)
- iku – (s) (s) Inuktitut language (ISO 639-2 code)

== IM ==
- IM
  - (s) Isle of Man (FIPS 10-4 territory code)
  - (i) Instant Message (Internet speech)
- IMA
  - (i) Intermediate Maintenance Activity
  - Institute of Mathematics and Applications
- IMBD – (i) International Migratory Bird Day
- IMDb – Internet Movie Database
- IME - (i) In My Experience
- IMF
  - (i) id music file/id's music format (audio file format)
  - Impossible Missions Force, the protagonist organization in the Mission: Impossible media franchise
  - International Monetary Fund (the most common use for the initialism)
- IMHO – (i) In My Humble/Honest Opinion, cf. IMO
- IMIST AMBO – used to facilitate an informed clinical handover between paramedics, emergency department staff or other healthcare similar to SBAR: Identification, Method of Injury, Index of concern, Signs, Treatment, Allergies, Medication, Background, and Other
- IML – (i) International Mister Leather
- IMLAST – (i) International Movement for Leisure Activities in Science and Technology – see MILSET
- IMNM - (i) - Immune-mediated necrotizing myopathy a rare, but serious ADR of statins
- IMNSHO – (i) In My Not So Humble Opinion
- IMO (in my opinion) – (i) In My Opinion, also "imo", cf. IMHO
- IMPAC – (a) International Merchant Purchase Authorization Card
- IMPACT – (a) International Medical Products Anti-Counterfeiting Taskforce
- IMPATT – (p) IMPact Avalanche Transit Time diode
- IMPT – (i) Institute of Maxillofacial Prosthetists and Technologists
- IMR – (i) Inzhenernaya Mashina Razgrazhdeniya (Russian Инженерные Машины Разграждения, "Engineer Vehicle Obstacle-Clearing") †
- IMRI
  - (i) Industrial Membrane Research Institute
  - Information Management Research Institute
  - Institut pour le management de la recherche et de l'innovation (French, "Institute for the Management of Research and Innovation")
  - International Market Research Information
  - Intraoperative Magnetic Resonance Imaging
- IMRO
  - Internal Macedonian Revolutionary Organization
  - Irish Music Rights Organisation
- IMRL – (i) Individual Material Readiness List
- IMS
  - (i) Information Management System
  - International Meat Secretariat
  - Ion Mobility Spectrometer
- IMSA
  - (i) Illinois Mathematics and Science Academy
  - International Mind Sports Association
  - International Motor Sports Association
- IMsL – (a) International Ms. Leather
- IMT – (i) Integrated Management Tool
- IMU – (i) International Mathematical Union

== IN ==
- In – (s) Indium
- IN – (s) India (FIPS 10-4 country code; ISO 3166 digram) – Indiana (postal symbol) – Infantry
- ina – (s) Interlingua language (ISO 639-2 code)
- INA – (p) Immigration and Nationality Act
- INAS – (a) International Near-Earth Asteroid Survey
- INC – (i) Indian National Congress, one of the national political parties in India
  - (i) Iglesia ni Cristo (Filipino, "Church of Christ")
  - Indian National Congress
  - International Network of Crackers
  - Iraqi National Congress
- INCITS – (p) InterNational Committee for Information Technology Standards
- ind – (s) Indonesian language (ISO 639-2 code)
- IND – (s) India (ISO 3166 trigram)
- inet – (a) the Internet
- INDIGO – (p) (U.S.) INtelligence DIvision Gaming Operation
- INFORMS – (a) (U.S.) Institute for Operations Research and the Management Sciences
- INFOSEC – (p) Information Security
- INLA – (i) Irish National Liberation Army
- INMARSAT – (p) International Maritime Satellite organization
- INR – (s) Indian rupee (ISO 4217 currency code)
- INRI – (a/i) Iesus Nazarenus Rex Iudæorum (Latin, "Jesus of Nazareth, King of the Jews")
- INRIA – (p) Institut national de recherche en informatique et en automatique
- INS – (i) Immigration and Naturalization Service
- InSAR – (p) Interferometric synthetic aperture radar
- INST – (p) Information Standards and Technology
- in trans. – (p) in transitu (Latin, "in transit")
- INTSUM – (p) Intelligence Summary
- INTERFET – (p) International Force for East Timor

== IO ==
- io – (s) Ido language (ISO 639-1 code)
- IO – (s) British Indian Ocean Territory (ISO 3166 digram; FIPS 10-4 territory code)
- IOC
  - (i) Initial Operational Capability
  - Intergovernmental Oceanic Commission
  - International Olympic Committee
  - International Ornithological Congress
- IOG (formerly IOHK) – Input Output Global. Redirected to Charles Hoskinson
- IOHK – Input Output Hong Kong. Redirected to Charles Hoskinson
- IOLTA – (a) Interest on Lawyer Trust Accounts (charitable funding mechanism, especially for legal aid)
- IOM
  - (i) Iowa, Ohio, Michigan (soybean origin)
  - Institute of Medicine
  - International Organization for Migration
  - Isle of Man
- IONA – (i) Islands of the North Atlantic (alternate name for Great Britain, Ireland, the Isle of Man, and related islands)
- IoT - (i) Internet of Things
- IOT – (s) British Indian Ocean Territory (ISO 3166 trigram)
- IOT&E – (i) Initial Operational Test and Evaluation
- IOU – (p) "I Owe You" (Promissory note)

== IP ==
- IP –
  - (s) Clipperton Island (FIPS 10-4 territory code)
  - (i) Initial Point – Intellectual Property – Internet Protocol
- IPA – (i) India Pale Ale – International Phonetic Alphabet – Isopropyl alcohol
- IPB – (i) Intelligence Preparation of the Battlefield
- IPCC –
  - (i) Intergovernmental Panel on Climate Change
  - Independent Police Complaints Commission
- ipk – (s) Inupiaq language (ISO 639-2 code)
- IPL – (i) Inferior Parietal Lobule
- IPN – (i) Instytut Pamieci Narodowej (Polish, "Institute for National Memory")
- IPO – (i) Initial public offering
- IPR –
  - (i) In Progress Review
  - Intellectual Property Rights
  - Intelligence Production Requirement
- IPT – (i) Integrated Product/Project Team
- IPTS – (i) Institute for Prospective Technological Studies
- IPTV – (p) Internet Protocol TeleVision
- IPW – (i) Interrogation of Prisoners of War

== IQ ==
- iq – (i) idem quod (Latin, "the same as")
- IQ –
  - (i) Intelligence Quotient
  - (s) Iraq (ISO 3166 digram)
- IQD – (s) Iraqi dinar (ISO 4217 currency code)

== IR ==
- Ir – (s) Iridium
- IR
  - (i) Infrared
  - Intelligence requirement (military)
  - (s) Iran (FIPS 10-4 country code; ISO 3166 digram)
  - Iran Air (IATA alpha code) see entry for more
- IRA
  - (i) Individual retirement account
  - (i) Irish Republican Army (any of several armed groups dedicated to Irish republicanism)
  - Internet Research Agency (used in the Mueller report)
- IRAD – (a) Internal Research and Development
- IRAN - (I) Inspect and Repair As Necessary
- IRAS – (p) Infrared Astronomical Satellite
- IRB – (i) International Rugby Board, a former name of World Rugby
- IRBM – (i) Intermediate Range Ballistic Missile
- IRC
  - (i) International Red Cross
  - International reply coupon
  - (i) Internet Relay Chat
- IREA
  - (i) Intermountain Rural Electric Association
  - (i) International Renewable Energy Alliance
  - (p) Iranian Esperanto Association
  - (i) Internet Radio Equality Act
- IRGC - (i) Islamic Revolutionary Guard Corps (branch of Iranian Armed Forces
- IRL
  - (s) Ireland (ISO 3166 trigram)
  - Industrial Research Limited
  - Indy Racing League, former name of the motorsport governing body now known as INDYCAR
  - (i) In real life
- IRM
  - (i) Illinois Railway Museum
  - Inzhenernaya Razvedyvatelnaya Mashina (Russian Инженерная Разведывательная Машина, "Engineer Reconnaissance Vehicle") †
- IRN – (s) Iran (ISO 3166 trigram)
- IRIAF - Islamic Republic of Iran Air Force
- IRINN - Islamic Republic of Iran News Network
- IRO – (i) International Refugee Organization
- IRQ – (s) Iraq (ISO 3166 trigram)
- IRR – (s) Iranian rial (ISO 4217 currency code)
- IRS – (i) U.S. Internal Revenue Service
- IRSN – (i) Institut de radioprotection et de sûreté nucléaire (French, "Institute for Radiation Protection and Nuclear Safety")
- IRST – (i) Infra-red Search and Track

== IS ==
- is – (s) Icelandic language (ISO 639-1 code)
- IS
  - (s) Iceland (ISO 3166 digram)
  - Israel (FIPS 10-4 country code)
- ISA
  - (i) Individual Savings Account
  - Industry Standard Architecture
  - Instruction Set Architecture
  - International Seabed Authority
- ISAAA – (i) International Service for the Acquisition of Agri-biotech Applications
- ISAF
  - (a) International Sailing Federation
  - International Security Assistance Force
- ISAR – (a) Inverse SAR (Synthetic Aperture Radar)
- ISB – (i) Intermediate Staging Base
- ISBN – (i) International Standard Book Number (ISO 2108)
- ISCCP – (i) International Satellite Cloud Climatology Project
- ISCII – (a) Indian Standard Code for Information Interchange
- ISDN – Integrated Services Digital Network
- ISEF – (a) Intel International Science and Engineering Fair
- ISEN – (i) Internet Search Environment Number
- ISF – (i) Internal Security Force
- ISI
  - Indian Standards Institute, former name of the Bureau of Indian Standards
  - Inter-Services Intelligence (Pakistan)
  - Islamic State of Iraq, an umbrella organization for several Iraqi insurgent groups
- ISIL – (i/a) Islamic State of Iraq and the Levant
- ISIS
  - (i/a) Institute for Science and International Security
  - Islamic State of Iraq and Syria
- ISK – (s) Icelandic krona (ISO 4217 currency code)
- isl – (s) Icelandic language (ISO 639-2 code)
- ISL – (s) Iceland (ISO 3166 trigram)
- ISLN –
  - (i) International Standard Lawyer Number (used initially by LexisNexis Martindale-Hubbell)
  - (i) International School Libraries Network (HQ in Singapore)
  - (s) Isilon Systems, the NASDAQ symbol
- ISM
  - (i) Industrial, scientific or medical
  - (p) Interstellar medium
- ISMB – (i) International Society of Matrix Biologists
- ISMC – (i) Intelligent Sounding Meaningless Conversation
- ISO
  - (i) In Search Of
  - (s) International Organization for Standardization (from the Greek ίσος, isos, meaning "equal")
- ISOGP – (i) Indian Society of Orthodontics for General Practitioners
- ISP
  - (i) International Standardized Profile
  - Internet service provider
  - Information Systems Professional
- ISPE – (a/i) International Society for Pharmacoepidemiology
- ISR
  - (i) Intelligence, Surveillance and Reconnaissance
  - (s) Israel (ISO 3166 trigram)
- ISRO – (i) Indian Space Research Organisation
- ISS
  - (i) International Shorebird Survey (North America)
  - International Space Station
- ISSCR – (i) International Society for Stem Cell Research
- ISSN – (i) International standard serial number (ISO 3297)
- IST
  - (i) Information System Technology
  - UCF Institute for Simulation and Training
- ISTAR – (i) Intelligence, Surveillance, Target Acquisition, and Reconnaissance
- ISTC – (i) Institute of Scientific and Technical Communications (UK)
- ISTG – (i) I Swear To God
- ISTS – (i) Intel Science Talent Search
- ISU
  - (i) Integrated Sight Unit
  - International Skating Union

== IT ==
- it – (s) Italian language (ISO 639-1 code)
- IT
  - (i) InferoTemporal (neurophysiology)
  - Information Technology
  - (s) Italy (FIPS 10-4 country code; ISO 3166 digram)
- ita – (s) Italian language (ISO 639-2 code)
- ITA – (s) Italy (ISO 3166 trigram)
- ITAG – (i) Inertial Terrain-Aided Guidance
- ITALY – (a) I'll Truly Always Love You
- ITAS – (i) Improved Target Acquisition Sight
- ITC
  - (i) Incorporated Television Company (defunct British television production company)
  - InferoTemporal Cortex (neurophysiology)
- ITCZ – (i/p) Intertropical Convergence Zone
- ITEC – (a) Information Technology Exposition & Conference
- ITEMS – (a) Interactive Tactical Environment Management System
- ITER – (a) International Thermonuclear Experimental Reactor
- ITF – (a) International Tennis Federation
- ITK – (a) In The Know
- ITN – (i) Independent Television News (British)
- ITS
  - (i) Incompatible Time-sharing System
  - Individual Training Standards
- ITT – (i) International Telephone and Telegraph (U.S.)
- ITTO – (i) International Tropical Timber Organization
- ITU
  - (i) Intent-to-Use
  - International Telecommunication Union (International Telegraph Union 1865–1932)

== IU ==
- iu – (s) (s) Inuktitut language (ISO 639-1 code)
- IUCN – (i) International Union for the Conservation of Nature and Natural Resources (World Conservation Union)
- IUD – (i) Intrauterine device (https://www.plannedparenthood.org/learn/birth-control/iud)
- IUI
  - (i) Indiana University Indianapolis, to be established in 2024 upon the dissolution of Indiana University–Purdue University Indianapolis (IUPUI, below)
  - Intrauterine insemination (http://americanpregnancy.org/infertility/intrauterine-insemination/)
- IUPAC – (a) International Union of Pure and Applied Chemistry (pronounced "eye-yoo-pac")
- IUPUI – (a) Indiana University–Purdue University Indianapolis
- IUSS
  - (i) Integrated Undersea Surveillance System
  - Integrated Unit Simulation System
  - International Union of Soil Sciences

== IV ==
- IV – (s) Côte d'Ivoire (FIPS 10-4 country code; from Ivory Coast) – Four (in Roman numerals) – (i) IntraVenous (as in intravenous drip or intravenous therapy)
- IVD – (i) Internet Video Device, intra vas device
- Iveco – (p) Industrial Vehicles Corporation
- IVF – (i) In Vitro Fertilisation
- IVI – (i) Interchangeable Virtual Instrument
- IVIS – (i/a) Inter-Vehicle Information System
- IVL – (i) Inter-Visibility Line
- IVM – (i) In Vitro [Oocyte] Maturation
- IVO – (i) In Vicinity Of

== IW ==
- IW – (i) Impact Wrestling
- IW – (i) Information Warfare
- IWARS – (p) Infantry Warrior Simulation
- IWC – (i) International Whaling Commission
- IWT – (i) Illegal Wildlife Trade
- IWW – (i) Industrial Workers of the World

== IX ==
- IX – (s) Nine (in Roman numerals)

== IY ==
- IY – (s) Saudi–Iraqi neutral zone (FIPS 10-4 territory code; obsolete 1993)
- Iykyk (acronym) – (i) If You Know You Know

== IZ ==
- IZ – (s) Iraq (FIPS 10-4 country code)
