= IOT =

IOT, IoT, or iot may refer to:

- Completed operations indicator, in Belgian railway signalling
- British Indian Ocean Territory, ISO 3166-1 alpha-3 code
- Illuminates of Thanateros, an international magical organization
- Inductive output tube, a variety of vacuum tube
- Input-Output Transfer, instructions for the PDP-8
- Institute of Transportation, an agency in Taiwan
- Interocular transfer, a visual perception phenomenon
- Internet of things, an Internet-like structure connecting everyday physical objects

== See also ==
- Indian Ocean Territory (disambiguation)
