= IANA (disambiguation) =

The Internet Assigned Numbers Authority oversees Internet Protocol–related symbols.

IANA or Iana may also refer to:

- Iranian Agriculture News Agency, an Iranian official news agency
- Iana, Vaslui, a commune in Romania
- Iana (given name)

== See also ==
- IANA time zone database
- IANAL, an acronym for "I am not a lawyer"
