= IGG =

IGG, IgG or igg may refer to:

- IGG Inc., a Chinese video game company
- IGG Software, US company
- Igiugig Airport, IATA code IGG
- Immunoglobulin G, IgG, a type of antibody
- Inert gas generator, tanker machinery
- Investigative genetic genealogy or forensic genetic genealogy

== See also ==
- IG (disambiguation)
