= IREA =

IREA may refer to:

== Companies and organizations ==
- Intermountain Rural Electric Association (now CORE Electric Cooperative), a non-profit electric utility company in the U.S. state of Colorado
- International Renewable Energy Alliance, a partnership of international renewable energy organizations
- Iranian Esperanto Association, the national association of the World Esperanto Association in Iran
- Islamic Research and Educational Academy, a religious organization based in Australia

== Law ==
- Internet Radio Equality Act, a legislative piece in the United States abandoned in 2008
