= IIRC =

IIRC may refer to:

- IIRC, an initialism for "If I Remember Correctly" or "If I Recall Correctly"
- International Integrated Reporting Council, in corporate governance
- IIRC, a reporting mark for Indiana Interstate Railway, United States
- International Interdisciplinary Research Center, Sigmund Freud University Vienna, Austria
