= IW =

IW may refer to:

== Arts, entertainment and media ==
- Infinity Ward, a video game developer
  - IW (game engine)
- InfoWorld, an information technology media business
- Industrial Worker, the newspaper of the Industrial Workers of the World
- I. W. Publications, a defunct comic book publisher
- Call of Duty: Infinite Warfare, a 2016 video game published by Activision

== Other uses ==
- Information warfare
- Isle of Wight
- Ipswich
- Irregular warfare
- German Economic Institute (German: Institut der deutschen Wirtschaft Köln e.V.) (IW)
- IW, the signature of one of the master founders of the Whitechapel Bell Foundry
- L85 Individual Weapon (IW), a variant of the British SA80
- AOM French Airlines, IATA code IW
- Wings Air, IATA code IW
- IWBank, an Italian online bank

== See also ==
- Infinity War (disambiguation)
- IW North American Heavyweight Championship, in International Wrestling
- IW19 Championship, in Internet Wrestling
- Help:Interwiki linking, for Wikipedia linking to other projects
