= Ahmad Reza Mamduhi =

Ahmad Reza Mamduhi Ahmad Reza Mamduhi
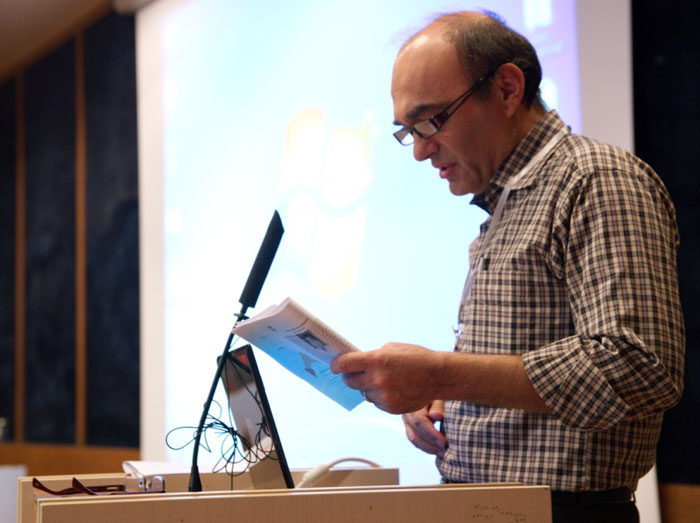
- During the 2nd Iranian Congress of Esperanto, Tehran (Iran), 2015

Vice president of the Iranian Esperanto Association

Ahmad Reza Mamduhi (born 1960) is an Iranian translator, author and an iconic figure in the Iranian Esperanto movement. He is best known for his prolific contributions to the Iranian Esperanto Association, as well as publishing two salient books, Aasaan-tarin zabaane donyaa (2005) — a comprehensive step by step Persian textbook concerning with learning/teaching Esperanto — and Padide-ye Esperanto (2007) — originally written in Esperanto by Nobel Prize-nominated William Auld, entitled La fenomeno Esperanto (The Esperanto Phenomenon). He has also written numerous articles in cultural magazines chiefly in the field of Esperantic Studies.

Mamduhi began to learn Esperanto in 1976 and became active in the propagation of Esperanto in the 1980s (served as the first chief-delegate of the world Esperanto Association in Iran). He currently serves as the Vice President of the Iranian Esperanto Association.

He studied architecture and urban design at Shahid Beheshti University and translated the English textbook Seven Rules for Sustainable Communities into Persian.
