= IUI (disambiguation) =

IUI most commonly refers to intrauterine insemination, a method of artificial insemination.

IUI may also refer to:

- iUI (software), a user interface library for the iPhone
- Indiana University Indianapolis
- International University of Iran, founded by Ali R. Rabi
- Intelligent user interface, a user interface that involves some aspect of artificial intelligence
- The IUI conference series on intelligent user interfaces organised by the Association for Computing Machinery
