= IGS =

IGS or Igs may refer to:

== Computing ==
- Information Global Service, Japanese video game company
- Initial Graphics Exchange Specification, file extension .igs
- InteGraphics Systems a former chip manufacturer
- Interactive geometry software
- Internet Go server, for the game of Go
  - IGS Go server, Japanese Go server

== Technology ==
- Image guided surgery
- Information Gathering Satellites, Japan
- Instrument guidance system

== Science ==
- Institute of General Semantics
- Intergenic spacer
- International Glaciological Society
- International Graphonomics Society
- International GNSS Service
- Ig Nobel Prize, sometimes referred to as the "Igs"

== Schools ==
- Ilkley Grammar School
- International Grammar School, Sydney
- Ipswich Grammar School
- Islington Green School

== Other ==
- Imerslund-Gräsbeck syndrome
- International Graduates Scheme, a UK immigration scheme
- Irish Georgian Society
- Ingolstadt Manching Airport, is a military airbase with civil usage located in Manching near Ingolstadt, Germany
