= IFAP =

IFAP may refer to:

- International Fashion Academy Pakistan
- International Federation of Agricultural Producers
