= ISTS =

ISTS may refer to:

- Intel Science Talent Search, now Regeneron Science Talent Search
- International Society for Twin Studies, a nonprofit scientific organization
- "I Shot the Sheriff", a 1973 song by The Wailers, popularized by Eric Clapton

== See also ==
- IST (disambiguation)
