= IPCC (disambiguation) =

The IPCC, or Intergovernmental Panel on Climate Change, is a scientific body under the auspices of the United Nations.

IPCC may also refer to:

== Other organisations ==
- Independent Police Complaints Commission, defunct public body in England and Wales
- Independent Police Complaints Council of the Hong Kong Government
- Independent Police Conduct Commission, Malaysian oversight body
- Irish Peatland Conservation Council, charity to preserve bogs

== Other uses ==
- Integrated Professional Competency Course, a course of the Institute of Chartered Accountants of India
- Interworld Police Coordinating Company, a fictional organization in Jack Vance's novels
