= Ier (disambiguation) =

The Ier is a river in Romania and Hungary.

Ier may also refer to:

- Ier, the Romanian name for the river Száraz-ér in Romania and Hungary

The acronym IER may refer to:

- Instance équité et réconciliation, a Moroccan human rights commission
- Institute of Education and Research
- International Economic Review, an economics journal
- Interurban Electric Railway, a division of the Southern Pacific Railroad in the U.S.
- Institut Eva Ruchpaul, a yoga training program
- Institute for Energy Research, a nonprofit public policy think tank
- New South Wales Institute for Educational Research, an Australian educational research institute
- Individual Electoral Registration, a reform of electoral registration in the United Kingdom proposed by the Coalition Government
- IER (company), a subsidiary of the Bollore group which owns Source London and electric car charging infrastructure
