= IDL =

IDL may refer to:

== Computing ==
- Interface description language, any computer language used to describe a software component's interface
  - IDL specification language, the original IDL created by Lamb, Wulf and Nestor at Queen's University, Canada
  - OMG IDL, an IDL standardized by Object Management Group selected by the W3C for exposing the DOM of XML, HTML, CSS, and SVG documents
  - Microsoft Interface Definition Language, an extension of OMG IDL for supporting Microsoft's DCOM services
  - Web IDL, a variation of an IDL for describing APIs that are intended to be implemented in Web browsers
- Interactive Data Language, a data analysis language popular for science applications
- ICAD Design Language, a knowledge-based engineering language used with the software ICAD

== Places ==
- John F. Kennedy International Airport, formerly named Idlewild Airport with IATA airport code IDL
- Indianola Municipal Airport, by FAA airport code
- Inner Dispersal Loop, the common name of Interstate 444, a highway in downtown Tulsa, Oklahoma

== Other uses ==
- Islamic Democratic League, a party
- International Date Line, the time zone date boundary
- Intermediate-density lipoprotein
- International Drivers License
- International Dance League
- International Darts League, a defunct major darts tournament
- IDL Drug Stores, a now-defunct independent drug store cooperative
- Internet Defense League, a website
