= IQ (disambiguation) =

IQ is an intelligence quotient, a total score derived from a set of standardized tests or subtests designed to assess human intelligence.

IQ may also refer to:

== Arts and entertainment ==
=== Film and television ===
- "IQ" (Frasier), episode 19 from the sixth season of the sitcom Frasier
- I.Q. (film), a 1994 comedy film starring Walter Matthau as Albert Einstein
- "iQ", an episode of the television series iCarly

=== Literature ===
- I.Q. (comics), a DC Comics character
- I, Q (Star Trek novel), 1999
- I, Q (book series), a series of young adult fiction mysteries by Roland Smith
- I.Q., a Marvel Comics character from Young Allies
- IQ (magazine)

=== Other media ===
- IQ (British band), a British neo-progressive rock band
- IQ (American group), an American pop girl group
- I.Q.: Intelligent Qube, a puzzle game for the PlayStation
- Eye Cue, a Macedonian duo

== Businesses and organisations ==
- IQ Crew, PC Services department of Circuit City electronics
- IQ.wiki, a wiki and encyclopedia on cryptocurrencies and blockchain companies
- Industries Qatar, a company based in Qatar
- Institute of Quarrying, an international engineering professional body based in Nottingham, England
- Augsburg Airways (IATA airline designator), a former German airline
- VietJet Qazaqstan (IATA airline designator), a Kazakh airline

== Science and technology ==
- .iq, the Internet country code top-level domain (ccTLD) for Iraq
- 2-Amino-3-methylimidazo[4,5-f]quinoline, a heterocyclic amine; See Heterocyclic amine formation in meat
- IQ 151, a microcomputer produced in Czechoslovakia during the 1980s
- I-Q signal, in-phase and quadrature components of amplitude modulated sinusoids
  - IQ Modulation, an analog and a digital modulation scheme
- Image quality, characteristic of an image that measures perceived image degradation
- Information quality, quality of the content of information systems
- I_{Q} for Quiescent current in electronics with no load

== Other uses ==
- Iraq (ISO 3166 country code IQ)
- Ora iQ, a battery electric compact car
- Toyota iQ, an ultra-compact car
- IQ Rugby, programme for Irish-qualified rugby union players in Great Britain
- Installation qualification, part of Verification and validation
- Inuit Qaujimajatuqangit, Inuit for traditional knowledge
- i.q., an initialism for the Latin phrase idem quod (the same as)
- Innovation Quarter, a district in Winston-Salem, North Carolina, United States

== See also ==
- IQ Sapuri, a former Japanese game show
- Social IQ, a measure of a person's social ability compared to other people of their age
- iQue, Chinese video game company
- In-phase and quadrature components, elements of a signal
