= IED =

IED may refer to:

== Devices ==
- Improvised explosive device, an explosive device often used in unconventional warfare
- Instantaneous electrical detonator, used to trigger an explosive device
- Intelligent electronic device, in the electric power industry
- Implantable electronic device, a pacemaker

== Dictionaries ==
- Indo-European Etymological Dictionary
- Indogermanisches etymologisches Wörterbuch (Indo-European Etymological Dictionary), by Julius Pokorny
- Interlingua–English Dictionary, the first major presentation of Interlingua to the public

== Healthcare ==
- Inter-ictal epileptiform discharge, a characteristic of epileptic seizures
- Intermittent explosive disorder, a mental health disorder
- Intestinal epithelial dysplasia, another name for congenital tufting enteropathy

== Organizations ==
- Information Engineering Directorate, Information Technology Directorate of the UK Department of Trade and Industry
- Institute for Educational Development, Aga Khan University
- Institute of Economic Development, United Kingdom
- Institution of Engineering Designers, United Kingdom
- Istituto Europeo di Design, European Institute of Design
- NASU Institute of Electrodynamics, a research institute in Kyiv

== Other uses ==
- Industrial Emissions Directive, a European Union directive
- Infliction of Emotional Distress, a tort cause of action falling under intentional torts
