= Ita =

Ita or ITA may refer to:

== Places and jurisdictions ==
- ITA, ISO 3166-1 country code for Italy
- Ita (Africa), an ancient city and former bishopric in Roman Mauretania, presently a Latin Catholic titular see
- Itá, Paraguay

== People ==
- Ita (princess), Egyptian princess
- Ita Buttrose (born 1942), Australian journalist and businesswoman
- Ita Ever (1931–2023), Estonian actress
- Ita Kozakeviča (1955–1990), Polish journalist and politician
- Ita Saks (1921–2003), Estonian translator and publicist
- Ita Wegman (1876–1943), Dutch co-founder of Anthroposophical Medicine
- Ida of Lorraine (11th century – 1113), mother of Godfrey of Bouillon
- Íte of Killeedy (c.480–c.570), Irish nun and saint

== Language ==
- Initial Teaching Alphabet, a phonetic alphabet system formerly used in British, and some American, schools to teach children to read
- Italian language, by ISO 639-2 language code
- International Telegraph Alphabet, also known as Baudot code

== Organizations and alliances ==
- Independent Television Authority, the regulator for commercial television in the UK from 1954 until 1972
- Independent Testing Authority, a certified voting system test laboratory
- Indian Television Academy, organization that administers the Indian Television Academy Awards
- Information Technology Agreement, a treaty on tariff regulation with a committee under the World Trade Organisation
- Institute of Technology Assessment, a research unit of the Austrian Academy of Sciences, Vienna
- Instituto Tecnológico de Aeronáutica or Technological Institute of Aeronautics, a Brazilian engineering college
- Integrated Transport Authority, the UK organisation overseeing Passenger Transport Executives
- Intercollegiate Tennis Association, an organization of coaches and collegiate tennis players
- International Tape Association, former name of the International Recording Media Association
- International Technology Alliance, a research program initiated by the UK Ministry of Defence and the US Army Research Laboratory
- International Testing Agency, an independent anti-doping organisation
- Internationaal Theater Amsterdam, the biggest theatre company of the Netherlands
- International Track Association, an American professional track and field league of the mid-1970s
- International Trade Administration, an agency of the United States Department of Commerce
- Italian Trade Agency, an agency of the Italian Republic that fosters the export of Italian products
- International Trombone Association
- International Tunneling and Underground Space Association
- ITA Airways, an Italian airline that replaced Alitalia (ICAO airline designator)
- ITA Software, a travel industry software company acquired by Google in 2011
- ITA Transportes Aéreos, a Brazilian airline

== Other uses ==
- Cyclone Ita, April 2014, Solomon Islands
- Internal thoracic artery, a blood vessel in the thorax
- Involuntary Treatment Act, refers to Washington State Involuntary Treatment Act or to a patient under such act
- Indonesian Television Awards, annual Indonesian TV awards broadcast on MNC Media
- [ita], a counterpart to [sic], Latin for "thus" or "just as", is inserted after quoted text to indicate it has been transcribed exactly as found in the source text, complete with any errors.

== See also ==
- Aeta, an ethnic group in the Philippine Islands
- Ité palm, Mauritia flexuosa, a palm tree
- Itta (592–652), wife of Pepin I
