= ICW =

ICW may refer to:

- Integrated constructed wetland
- International Clan War
- International Community of Women Living with HIV/AIDS
- International Confederation of Wizards
- International Council of Women
- Internet call waiting, a technology that allows a telephone line to accept incoming calls while connected to a dialup connection
- Intracoastal Waterway
- Indonesia Corruption Watch
- Interrupted continuous wave
- Irish Civil War

== Wrestling ==
- International Championship Wrestling, a now-defunct professional wrestling promotion based in Lexington, Kentucky, active 1978–1984
- International World Class Championship Wrestling, a now-defunct New England–based wrestling promotion, known as International Championship Wrestling from 1985 to 1991
- Insane Championship Wrestling, an active Scottish promotion established in 2006
- Independent Championship Wrestling, an active American promotion established in 2008, based in Miami, Florida
