= ICSI =

ICSI may refer to:

- Intracytoplasmic sperm injection, a medical technique used in assisted reproduction
- International Computer Science Institute, a non-profit research lab in Berkeley, California
- Institute of Company Secretaries of India, a professional organisation in India
