= IMRO (disambiguation) =

IMRO is an abbreviation for the Internal Macedonian Revolutionary Organization.

IMRO may also refer to:

- Irish Music Rights Organisation
- IMRO – Bulgarian National Movement
- IMRO–DPMNE, Macedonian political party
- IMRO-PP, Macedonian political party
- IMRO (United)

== See also ==
- Imro Fox, German-born American chef and magician
- Imaro
