= IPL (disambiguation) =

The IPL (Indian Premier League) is a cricket league in India.

IPL may also refer to:

== Sport ==
- Indonesian Premier League, a football league from 2011 to 2013
- Indoor Professional League, an indoor soccer league
- Iran Pro League or Persian Gulf Pro League, a football league
- Irish Premier League or NIFL Premiership, a Northern Irish football league
- Israeli Premier League, a football league

== Computing ==
- IBM Public License, an open-source software license
- Initial Program Load or Initial Program Loader
- Information Processing Language, a programming language
- Interrupt priority level, a part of the current system interrupt state

== Institutes ==
- Instituto Politécnico de Leiria, a technical institute in Leiria, Portugal
- Instituto Politécnico de Lisboa, a technical institute in Lisbon, Portugal
- Instituto Politécnico Loyola, a technical institute in San Cristóbal, Dominican Republic

== Business ==
- AES Indiana, an electric utility company in Indianapolis, Indiana, formerly named Indianapolis Power & Light and IPL Power
- Interstate Power and Light, a subsidiary of Alliant Energy in Iowa
- IPL Information Processing Limited, a European consultancy company
- Infiniti Performance Line, the performance division of Infiniti

== Other uses ==
- IGN Pro League, an electronics sports league
- India pale lager, a style of beer
- Inferior parietal lobule, a part of the brain
- Intellectual property law
- Intense pulsed light, a cosmetic and medical treatment
- Internet Public Library, a non-profit website at Drexel University
- Imperial County Airport, California (by IATA airport code)
- International Programme on Landslides, a global cooperation programme of the International Consortium on Landslides
- Polish Initiative, a Polish political party
