= Independent Police Conduct Commission =

Malaysian government agency

- Suruhanjaya Bebas Tatakelakuan Polis

Commission overview
- Formed: 1 July 2023; 2 years ago
- Jurisdiction: Government of Malaysia
- Headquarters: Aras 7, Setia Perkasa 7, Kompleks Setia Perkasa, Putrajaya
- Minister responsible: Saifuddin Nasution Ismail, Minister of Home Affairs
- Deputy Minister responsible: Shamsul Anuar Nasarah, Deputy Minister of Home Affairs
- Commission executives: Zolkopli Dahalan, Chairman; Mohamad Jazamuddin Ahmad Nawawi, Deputy Chairman
- Parent department: Ministry of Home Affairs
- Key document: Independent Police Conduct Commission Act 2022

The Independent Police Conduct Commission (IPCC) is an independent oversight body in Malaysia that oversees the conduct of the Royal Malaysia Police. The controversial commission is a replacement for the Independent Police Complaints and Misconduct Commission (IPCMC) which was recommended by the Royal Commission of Inquiry (RCI) to Enhance the Operation and Management of the Royal Malaysia Police in 2005.

Coming into force in June 2023, the commission is primarily tasked to consider complaints from the public against the police force and deal with police misconduct. The commission derives its power from the IPCC Act 2022. Under Section 4 of the Act, the commission's functions are to receive complaints alleging misconduct by members of the police force and advice the government on promoting integrity within the force.

== History ==
The Royal Malaysia Police has a long history of human rights violations and abuse of power including the excessive use of force, torture, ill-treatment, harassment, and death in custody as documented by both national and international non-governmental organizations (NGOs). Notable recent cases include the death of Mohd Afis Ahmad who died from blunt force trauma to the head in January 2021 while in police custody, and the death of milk trader A. Ganapathy, who died from injuries on his legs and shoulders while in police custody in April 2021. Promised investigations into such cases by the police force are usually not fulfilled.

=== Tabling of IPCMC Bill in July 2019 ===
In July 2019, the Pakatan Harapan (PH) government tabled an IPCMC Bill in the parliament to replace the Enforcement Agency Integrity Commission (EAIC). The Bill received severe criticism from civil society as it failed to provide the proposed commission sufficient powers and independence to ensure its effectiveness. In response to massive public outcry, the government postponed the second reading of the bill scheduled in October 2019 and referred the bill to Parliamentary Special Select Committee (PSC) for Consideration of Bills for further reviews and considerations.

After conducting extensive reviews and public consultations, the PSC amended the bill which restored most of the contents proposed by the RCI in 2005. However, before the amended bill could be tabled in the parliament for second reading, the PH coalition government collapsed in March 2020 from the Sheraton move.

=== Introduction of IPCC Bill ===
The Perikatan Nasional (PN) coalition that took over the government after the Sheraton Move introduced the fresh IPCC Bill in August 2020, purportedly with the same intent as the IPCMC bill but ignoring the work of the PSC. According to then-Minister of Home Affairs Hamzah Zainudin, the bill was drafted "after a comparison was made between the Independent Office for Police Conduct (United Kingdom) and the Independent Police Complaints Council (Hong Kong)".

The IPCC bill was described by Amnesty International Malaysia as being "regressive" as it "undermines years of consultations", and that the IPCC will have less power than the EAIC, the bill it is set to replace.

The bill was passed with a majority voice vote in the Dewan Rakyat on 26 July 2022 and the Dewan Negara on 8 August 2022.

=== Going into force on 1 July 2023 ===
After the 15th general election, the new home minister Saifuddin Nasution Ismail announced in December 2022 that the IPCC Act 2022 will be enforced in June 2023 as scheduled. This was met with fresh rounds of pushback from civil society, with the Malaysian Bar urging the new government to amend the IPCC Act before it comes into force.

The IPCC Act 2022 eventually went into force on 1 July 2023 and the commission was formally established on the same day.
