= IVD =

IVD may refer to:

- Induced vaginal delivery, a method of birth where labor is artificially induced
- Instantaneous voltage droop, a concern in power distribution in electrical and electronic systems
- Instrumental vaginal delivery, a method of birth with assistance from a medical instrument
- Intra-Vas Device, a device used in vas-occlusive contraception, a method of contraception for males
- Intervertebral disc, a component of the spine
- IVD, a human gene for production of Isovaleryl-CoA dehydrogenase
- Intake valve deposits, deposits which may form on a Poppet valve intake
- In vitro diagnostics, a category of medical tests
- Ideographic Variation Database, a database of Unicode's ideographic variation sequences
