= ISMC =

ISMC may stand for:

- International Council for Ski Mountaineering Competitions
- Institute for the Study of Muslim Civilisations
- The International Society of Motor Control
- The International Soil Modeling Consortium — ISMC
- International Singapore Maths Competition
- Islamic Seminaries Management Center
