= Ist =

Ist or IST may refer to:

== Information Science and Technology ==
- Bachelor's or master's degree in Information Science and Technology
- Graduate School / Faculty of Information Science and Technology, Hokkaido University, Japan
- Graduate School of Information Science and Technology, The University of Tokyo, Japan
- IST initiative of Stanford University, USA

== Places ==
- Ist (island), an island in the Adriatic Sea
- Istanbul Airport (IATA code)
- Istora MRT station, a rapid transit station in Jakarta, Indonesia

== Schools and organizations ==
- Institute of Science and Technology, Austria, IST Austria
- Institute of Science and Technology, Bangladesh, Dhaka
- Institute of Science and Technology, West Bengal, India
- Institute of Space Technology, in Islamabad, Pakistan
- International Socialist Tendency, grouping of Marxist organisations
- Instituto Superior Técnico, school of engineering, University of Lisbon, Portugal
- Institute for Simulation and Training, at the University of Central Florida, US
- International School of Tanganyika, Tanzania
- International School of Toulouse, a school in the south of France
- International Spartacist Tendency, a Trotskyist grouping
- International School Tripoli
- Penn State College of Information Sciences and Technology, Pennsylvania, USA
- IST Entertainment

== Sports ==
- IS Tighennif, a football club based in Algeria
- NBA In-Season Tournament, an annual basketball tournament

== Science and technology ==
- Inappropriate sinus tachycardia, an uncommon type of cardiac arrhythmia
- Interrupt Stack Table, an AMD64 instruction set extension
- InterSwitch Trunk, Avaya enhancement to Link aggregation
- ist, the file extension for files created by the now-obsolete Adobe ImageStyler
- Information and Software Technology, a journal
- Interstellar Technologies, a Japanese rocket manufacturer

=== Mathematics ===
- Internal set theory, an axiomatic basis for part of non-standard analysis
- Inverse scattering transform, a method for solving some non-linear partial differential equations

== Time zones ==
- Indian Standard Time
- Irish Standard Time
- Israel Standard Time

== Other uses ==
- Istriot, a Romance language spoken in Croatia (ISO 639-3 language code ist)
- Toyota ist, a subcompact car made in Japan by Toyota

== See also ==
- Society for Imaging Science and Technology (IS&T), a research and education organization in the field of imaging
- -ism
