= IEA =

IEA may refer to:

== Political entities ==
- The country of Afghanistan, officially named as the Islamic Emirate of Afghanistan since August 2021
- Islamic Emirate of Afghanistan (1996–2001), a previous Taliban-led state that ruled most of Afghanistan from 1996 to 2001

== Education ==
- Instituto Español de Andorra, an international school in Spain
- International Association for the Evaluation of Educational Achievement

== Policy bodies ==
- Institute of International and European Affairs (formerly Institute of European Affairs), an Irish think tank
- International Energy Agency, an intergovernmental organisation based in Paris

== Science and medicine ==
- Institute of Ethnology and Anthropology, Russia
- International Epidemiological Association
- International Ergonomics Association
- Involuntary Emergency Admission, in psychiatry

== Advocacy organisations ==
- Institute of Economic Affairs, a British think tank

== Others ==
- Indian Evidence Act, 1872, a former evidence act in India
