= IDF (disambiguation) =

IDF commonly refers to the Israel Defense Forces, the combined military forces of Israel.

IDF may also refer to:

== Defence forces ==
- Irish Defence Forces, the combined military forces of Ireland
- Iceland Defense Force, of the U.S. Armed Forces, 1951–2006
- Indian Defence Force, a part-time force, 1917

== Organizations ==
- Israeli Diving Federation
- International Diabetes Federation
- International DOI Foundation, of the digital object identifier
- Immune Deficiency Foundation

== Places ==
- Île-de-France, a region of France
- Idiofa Airport, Kwilu, Democratic Republic of the Congo (IATA airport code: IDF)

== Other uses ==
- Intensity-duration-frequency curve, for rainfall
- Intel Developer Forum
- Intermediate Data Format, a file format for electronic design automation
- Intermediate distribution frame, for telecommunications wiring
- AIDC F-CK-1 Ching-kuo, or Indigenous Defense Fighter, a Taiwanese aircraft
- Inverse Document Frequency, a factor in the tf–idf principle
- Indirect fire
- International Day of Forests

== See also ==
- IDF1, a French TV channel
