= IS =

IS may refer to:

== Arts and media ==
=== Literature ===
- Book of Isaiah, a biblical text
- Is (novel), by Joan Aiken
- i"s, a manga by Masakazu Katsura
- IS – Otoko Demo Onna Demo Nai Sei, a manga by Chiyo Rokuhana
- Infinite Stratos, a Japanese light novel series

=== Other media ===
- Is (Chick Corea album)
- Is (My Morning Jacket album)
- iS – internal section, a video game developed by Square
- is, an album by Hey Ocean!

== Businesses and organisations ==
- Independent Sector, an American philanthropic coalition
- Intermediate school, education between primary and secondary schools areas, also known as middle school
- Ilta-Sanomat, a newspaper in Finland
- Intelligent Systems, a first-party video game developer and internal team of Nintendo
- International Socialists (disambiguation), several Trotskyist political organizations
- Investment—Saving, a curve in the IS/LM model of economics
- IRS Airlines (IATA code)
- Island Airlines (IATA code)

== Language ==
- Is, the third-person singular present tense of the English language verb "to be", frequently used as a copula
- Icelandic language (ISO 639-1 alpha-2 code)
- International Sign, a pidgin sign language
- Is (rune) (ᛁ), a rune of the Anglo-Saxon fuþorc

== Places ==
- Hīt, or Is, an Al Anbar town on the Euphrates River
- Iași County, Romania, (vehicle registration code)
- Iceland (ISO 3166-1 alpha-2 country code)
- Inverness TMD, a railway traction maintenance depot (depot code)
- Province of Isernia, Italy (vehicle registration code)
- Islamabad Capital Territory, capital region of Pakistan
- Island (Is.), any piece of land surrounded by water
- Israel (NATO country code)
- Ys or Is, a mythical city of Brittany

== Science and mathematics ==
- Immune system, organic mechanisms that protect against disease
- Immunosuppression
- Importance sampling, a statistical technique for estimating properties of a particular distribution
- Infrasound, sound frequencies below the human range of hearing
- Insertion sequence, a short DNA transposable element
- Intersex, an organism with sex characteristics neither exclusively male nor female

== Technology ==
=== Computing ===
- .is, the Internet country-code top-level domain for Iceland
- Information science, the study of data collection, manipulation, and dissemination
- Information systems, organizations of data-processing persons, records, and activities
- InstallShield, a software tool for creating software installers for Microsoft Windows
- IntelliStar, a computer system used to display local forecasts on The Weather Channel
- The relational operator is, used in Python
- The type comparison operator is, used in C#

=== Vehicles and weaponry ===
- IS tank, a Soviet heavy tank in World War II
- Istrebitel Sputnikov or "Destroyer of Satellites", a Soviet anti-satellite weapons program
- Lexus IS, a sports car made by Lexus
- Locomotive IS, a Soviet passenger steam locomotive
- Nikitin-Shevchenko IS, a Soviet fighter aircraft

=== Other uses in technology ===
- Image stabilization, a family of techniques to reduce blur caused by lens shakes
- Canon Image Stabilizer, a lens-based image stabilization technology by Canon
- Intrinsic safety, a protection technique for electronic equipment in explosive atmospheres
- Indian Standard, developed by the Bureau of Indian Standards, for example IS 456
- International Standard, a mounting standard for the calipers and rotors of disc-type bicycle brake systems

== Other uses ==
- Internal security, the work of keeping domestic peace by a national force
- International studies, or International relations, the study of politics, economics and law on a global level
- Intervention specialist, the title of a special education teacher in some states of the U.S.
- Is, in is-ought philosophy, a fact or empirical state with finite limits in space and time
- Old Israeli Shekel, commonly denominated as IS
- Islamic State, transnational Salafi jihadist group and unrecognized quasi-state

== See also ==
- I (disambiguation)
- Independence Square (disambiguation), several public squares around the world
- International System of Units (SI), the modern form of the metric system
- Interstate (disambiguation)
- Islamic state, a form of government based on Islamic law
