= IWW (disambiguation) =

IWW, or Industrial Workers of the World (known as the Wobblies), is an international union founded in 1905.

IWW may also refer to:

- Industrial WasteWater (see Industrial wastewater treatment)
- Inland waterway, a navigable river, canal, or sound
- Irish Whip Wrestling, an Irish-owned independent professional wrestling promotion established in 2002
- It Was Written, an album by American rapper Nas
