= IJN =

IJN may refer to:

- International Justice Network, a human rights organization
- Imperial Japanese Navy, the navy of Japan from 1868 until it was dissolved in 1945
- IJN, a 1978 wargame about naval combat in the Pacific during World War II
- Institut Jean Nicod, a French interdisciplinary research center
- Institut Jantung Negara, National Heart Institute of Malaysia
- Intermountain Jewish News, an international weekly newspaper publication located in Denver, Colorado
- Kalabari language (ISO 639-3 code ijn)
