= International School Tripoli =

- Tripoli; Libya

Information
- Established: 2005; 21 years ago
- Grades: Nursery - Year 13
- Affiliation: GEMS Education

International School Tripoli (IST) is a GEMS Education international school in Saraj, western Tripoli, Libya. It uses the British curriculum for Nursery through Year 13.

== History ==
The school opened in September 2005, with the second phase of the school opened in September of the following year. The senior school was scheduled to open in September 2007. It became an all-through school in September 2008.

Initially the students were of 20 different nationalities.

The school closed temporarily in February 2011 due to the 2011 Libyan Civil War. By March it had no definite restart date. IST students moved to other GEMS schools in the United Kingdom, Dubai, Egypt, and India.

The Japanese Supplemental School in Tripoli (トリポリ補習授業校 Toripori Hoshū Jugyō Kō), a weekend Japanese school, held classes at IST.
