= IMSA (disambiguation) =

IMSA is the International Motor Sports Association, an auto racing governing body headquartered in Daytona Beach, Florida, United States.

IMSA may also refer to:

== International Motor Sports Association ==
- IMSA SportsCar Championship, International Motor Sports Association's flagship racing series from 2014 to present.
- IMSA GT Championship, International Motor Sports Association's flagship racing series from 1971 to 1998.
- IMSA GT3 Cup Challenge
- IMSA Prototype Challenge
- IMSA VP Racing SportsCar Challenge
- IMSA Ford Mustang Challenge

== Other motorsport ==
- IMSA Performance, a French sports car racing team competing in European Le Mans series

== Other ==
- Illinois Mathematics and Science Academy, a residential school located in Aurora, Illinois
- Indigenous Marine Stewardship Area
- International Mind Sports Association, an association formed by the international federations of several intellectual games
- International Municipal Signal Association, an association covering standards, certification, and training in areas of fire alarms, highway signs and markings, traffic signals, and roadway lighting
