= IRB =

IRB may refer to:

== Organizations ==
- Immigration and Refugee Board of Canada, a Canadian administrative tribunal
- Indian Reserve Battalion, a special unit of the Indian Police Force
- Institut Ruđer Bošković (Ruđer Bošković Institute), a Croatian research institute
- Institutional review board, a committee to monitor research involving humans
- Instituto de Resseguros do Brasil, a Brazilian reinsurance company
- Instituto Ricardo Brennand, a museum in Recife, Brazil
- International Rugby Board, the former name of World Rugby, the governing board of rugby union
- IRB Infrastructure, an Indian road infrastructure company
- Irish Republican Brotherhood, an Irish secret revolutionary society of the 19th and early 20th centuries

== Technology ==
- Interactive Ruby Shell, a shell for programming in Ruby
- ASEA IRB, a line of industrial robots

== Other ==
- Ian Rank-Broadley, British sculptor and designer of the fourth coinage portrait of Elizabeth II
- Inflatable rescue boat, a rubber boat with an outboard motor used in surf lifesaving
  - IRB racing
- Indian Rocks Beach, a city in Pinellas County, Florida
- Internal ratings-based approach (credit risk), a method for estimating bank capital requirements
- Internal Revenue Bulletin, a weekly publication of the U.S. Internal Revenue Service
