= IFR (disambiguation) =

IFR is instrument flight rules, rules for when flight by outside visual reference is not safe.

IFR may also refer to:

- Infection fatality rate in epidemiology
- Ideal final result, an engineering design goal
- In-flight refueling
- Institute of Food Research, an agricultural and food science research institution
- Integral fast reactor, a nuclear reactor design
- International Federation of Robotics
- International Financing Review, a financial magazine
- International Fleet Review, various publications of the same name
- Instantaneous wave-free ratio (iFR), a diagnostic medical test used in coronary artery stenosis assessment
- Immortals Fenyx Rising, a 2020 video game
- Infield fly rule, a rule in baseball that treats certain balls as caught regardless of outcome
