= ISTC =

ISTC may refer to:

- Illinois Sustainable Technology Center housed at the Prairie Research Institute
- Incunabula Short Title Catalogue
- Independent Sector Treatment Centre, part of the UK National Health Service
- Institute of Scientific and Technical Communicators
- International Science and Technology Center
- International Space Training Center, the fictional institution behind Mission: Space ride at Epcot
- International Standard Text Code, a numeric code in development by the ISO for textual works
- International Student Travel Confederation
- The former Iron and Steel Trades Confederation trade union, now part of Community (trade union)
