= IAW =

IAW may refer to:

- Ice Arena Wales, an ice hockey rink in the Cardiff International Sports Village in Cardiff, Wales
- International Alliance of Women, an international non-governmental organization that works to promote women's human rights
- Iraqi Airways (ICAO designator: IAW), the national carrier of Iraq
- Israeli Apartheid Week, an annual series of university lectures and rallies
