= IUSS =

IUSS may refer to:

- Integrated Undersea Surveillance System
- Integrated Undersea Surveillance System insignia
- The International Union of Soil Sciences
- IUSS Pavia, a Higher Learning Institution in Pavia, Italy
