= InteGraphics Systems =

IGS Technologies
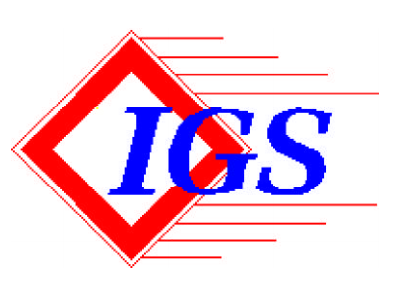
- Formerly: InteGraphics Systems
- Type: Public
- Industry: Computer hardware
- Founded: January 1993; 33 years ago
- Headquarters: Santa Clara, California, U.S.
- Products: Video cards
- Website: www.tvia.com

InteGraphics Systems is a former computer graphics chip company, created in 1993 in Santa Clara, California. The name was changed to IGS Technologies in 1997. In 2000, the name was changed again to TVIA after the company changed directions and went into making display processors and converters for TVs and other devices.

== Products ==
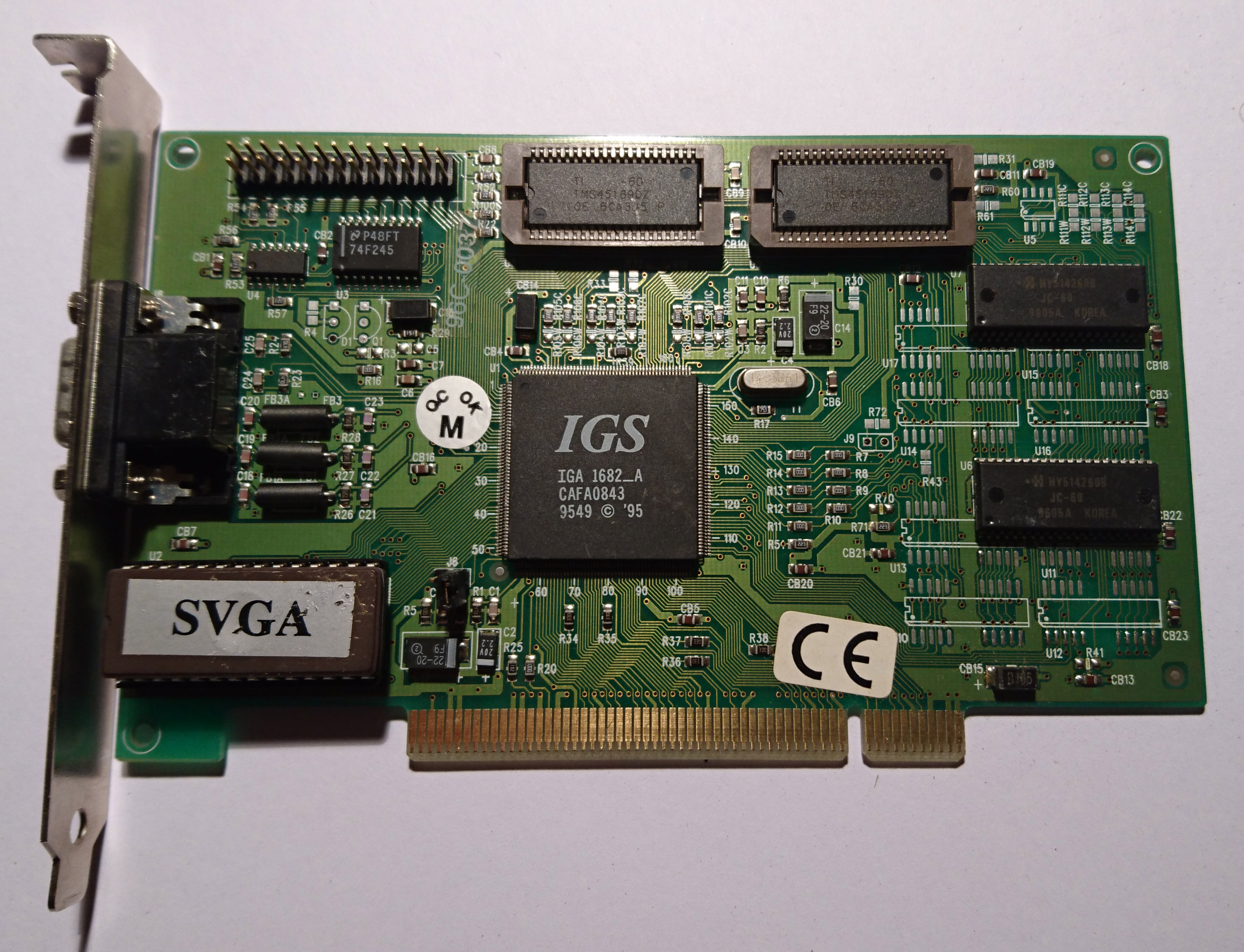
IGS IGA1682_A PCI, with 2Mb of RAM

- IGA 1680
- IGA 1682 with software MPEG playback
- IGA 1683
- CyberPro 2000 - 64-bit multimedia accelerator with an on-chip TV encoder
- CyberPro 2000A
- CyberPro 2010 (also sold with the Tvia logo)
- Video ExcelPro 2000
- CyberPro 3000 - PixelSquirt engine
- CyberPro 5000

The IGS 1682 VGA had drivers for Windows 95 and Windows 3.x.

CyberPro 2000 offers a 64-bit GUI accelerator, 200 MHZ RAMDAC, dual programmable clock and NTSC/PAL TV Encoder all integrated in one chip. Supports 128-bit EDO DRAM interface, three independently scalable hardware windows for video conferencing, hardware color space conversion, TVDirect dual display technology with Video on TV and graphics on VGA or simultaneous VGA and TV display, SimulPlay technology allowing DVD/MPEG playback on TV while using the PC for conventional applications under Windows 95/3.1/NT or OS/2. March 4, 1997 volume pricing was $15/chip.
