= ITK =

ITK may stand for:

- ITK (gene), a mammalian gene encoding IL2-inducible T-cell kinase
- Itk, (a.k.a. IncrTk), a programming language
- Innovation TK Ltd
- Insight Segmentation and Registration Toolkit, an extensible open source image software library
- Kalimantan Institute of Technology (Institut Teknologi Kalimantan), a university in Balikpapan, Indonesia
- Inuit Tapiriit Kanatami, a Canadian organisation representing Inuit
