= ISF =

ISF may stand for:

== Science and technology ==
- Imaging Science Foundation
- Incremental sheet forming
- Information Security Forum, an international information security best practices organization
- Ingenieurs Sans Frontieres (Engineers Without Borders)
- Ink Serialized Format, a vector image file format from Microsoft
- Interstitial fluid
- Israel Science Foundation

== Education ==
- Idries Shah Foundation, educational charity
- Independent Schools Foundation Academy, private international school in Hong Kong
- Insaf Student Federation, it is the largest Center-Left Student organization in the Nation and the official student wing of the Pakistan Tehreek-e-Insaf political party
- International School of Florence
- International School Sport Federation, sports governing body for high school sport
- Internationale Schule Frankfurt Rhein-Main

== Sport ==
- International Snowboard Federation
- International Softball Federation
- International Skyrunning Federation, world sports governing body for skyrunning
- International Socca Federation, governing body of small-sided-football
- International Sumo Federation, governing body for amateur sumo

== Other ==
- International Stabilization Force, military force in Gaza.
- Idaho Shakespeare Festival, theater company
- Importer Security Filing
- Impôt de Solidarité sur la Fortune, a French wealth tax
- Indian Secular Front, an Indian political party
- Information Support Force, a service branch of the People's Liberation Army
- Internal Security Forces, of Lebanon
- International Seafarers' Federation, former international trade secretariat
- Iraqi security forces
- Italian Strategic Fund
- Lexus IS F
