= List of reporting marks: I =

Note: Marks ending in U are for container owners; marks ending in X are not common carriers; marks ending in Z are for trailers without flanged wheels. All other marks are of common-carrier railroads.

== I ==
- IAIS - Iowa Interstate Railroad
- IALU - Japan Line, Ltd
- IANR - Iowa Northern Railway
- IAPX - Liquid Air, Inc.; Air Liquide America Corporation
- IARX - InStar, J.P. Morgan
- IASZ - Iowa Interstate Railroad
- IAT - Iowa Terminal Railroad
- IATR - Iowa Traction Railroad
- IBCX - Indiana Boxcar Corporation
- IBNU - Interpool Container Pty, Ltd.
- IBPX - Merchants Despatch Transportation Corp.; IBP, Inc.; Trinity Industries Leasing Co. (Lessee: IBP, Inc.; Tyson Foods)
- IBT - International Bridge and Terminal Company
- IBYU - Tuscola and Saginaw Bay Railway
- IC - Illinois Central Railroad; Illinois Central Gulf Railroad; Canadian National Railway
- ICCU - ICCU Containers, Inc.
- ICCX - International Catalyst Corporation
- ICE - Iowa, Chicago and Eastern Railroad
- ICEU - Inter-Continental Equipment, Inc.
- ICEZ - GATX Capital Corporation
- ICG - Illinois Central Gulf Railroad; Illinois Central Railroad; Canadian National Railway
- ICGU - Illinois Central Railroad; Canadian National Railway
- ICGZ - Illinois Central Railroad; Canadian National Railway
- ICHU - Ingetra, AG
- ICIU - Intermodal Containers, Inc.
- ICIX - ICI Americas, Inc.
- ICIZ - Intermodal Containers, Inc.
- ICLU - International Container Leasing
- ICLX - Intercoastal Leasing, Inc.
- ICLZ - International Chassis Leasing, Inc.
- ICMU - Interox America
- ICMX - Illinois Cereal Mills, Inc.
- ICOU - Japan Line, Ltd.
- ICPU - Intermodal Container Pool, Inc.
- ICPZ - Intermodal Container Pool, Inc.
- ICRK - Indian Creek Railroad
- ICRU - Ingetra, AG
- ICRX - Island Creek Coal Company; Island Creek Corporation
- ICRZ - Illinois Central Railroad; Canadian National Railway
- ICSU - Transamerica Leasing, Inc.
- ICSZ - Transamerica Leasing, Inc.; Union Pacific Railroad
- IDAC - Idaho Central Railroad; Boise Pacific Railroad
- IDAX - Industria del Alcali, SA
- IDCU - Ideal Container
- IDOX - United States Department of Energy (Idaho Operations Office)
- IDSZ - Industrial Distribution Service, Inc.
- IDTX - Illinois Department of Transportation
- IEAU - Intermodal Equipment Associates
- IELZ - Iran Express Lines
- IESX - IESX Corporation; Alliant Energy
- IFBX - Indiana Farm Bureau Cooperative Association, Inc.; GE Rail Services Corporation
- IFCX - Interstate Foods Corporation
- IFLU - Interflow
- IFOX - Industrial Fuel Oil, Inc.
- IFRX - Infinity Rail
- IFSU - Interlink Freight Systems
- IFWZ - Independent Freightway, Inc.
- IGN - International-Great Northern
- IGPX - Industrial Steam Products
- IHAU - Ihora Chemical Industrial
- IHB - Indiana Harbor Belt Railroad
- IHCU -
- IHRC - Indiana Hi-Rail Corporation
- IHSX - Alberni Pacific Railway (Western Vancouver Island Heritage Society)
- IICZ - Illinois Central Railroad; Canadian National Railway
- IIIU - III Transportation
- IIIZ - III Transportation
- IILU - Independent Container Line
- IILZ - Independent Container Line
- IIRC - Indiana Interstate Railway
- IIRZ - III Transportation
- IKCU - Interpool
- IKKU - ICCU Containers, Inc.
- IKSU - Transamerica Leasing, Inc.
- ILDX - General Electric (Lighting Business Group)
- ILMU - Flow Line Transport
- ILSX - Independent Locomotive Service
- ILTU - International Liquid Transport Company, Bv
- ILW - Illinois Western Railroad
- IMCX - International Minerals and Chemical Corporation; IMC Global Operations
- IMEX - Indiana and Michigan Electric Company
- IMFX - General American Transportation Corporation
- IMMX - Industrial Minera Mexico, SA
- IMRL - Illinois and Missouri Rail Link; Iowa, Chicago and Eastern Railroad
- IMRR - Illinois and Midland Railroad
- IMSX - IMCO Services (a division of the Halliburton Company); International Mill Service
- IMSZ - Intermodal Systems, Inc.
- IMTX - Multifoods Transportation, Inc.; AG Processing, Inc.
- IMXZ - Intermodal Express, Inc.
- IN - Indiana Northeastern Railroad
- INCU - Intercontinental Transport, B.V.
- INCX - Inco Railway
- INCZ - Intercontinental Transport, B.V.
- INCZ - Intercontinental Transport, B.V.
- INDU - Dorothea Marine Entreprise and Management
- INDX - Indelpro, SA de CV
- INFX - Infineum USA, Ltd.
- INGX - Ingomar Packing Company; GE Rail Services Corporation
- INKU - Interpool, Ltd.
- INLX - Inland Steel Coal Company; Incoal Company
- INOH - Indiana and Ohio Railroad
- INOX - Indiana and Ohio Rail Corporation
- INPR - Idaho Northern and Pacific Railroad
- INRD - Indiana Rail Road
- INSU - Intersub Services
- INSX - Independent Salt Company
- INT - Interstate Railroad; Norfolk Southern
- INTU - Interpool Container Pty, Ltd.
- INVX - Invista S.A.R.L.; Koch Rail, LLC
- INYU - Infinity Transportation Logistics
- INTZ - Interpool, Ltd.
- IOCR - Indiana and Ohio Central Railroad
- IOCX - Rail Enterprises, Inc.
- IOLU - Textainer Equipment Management (US), Ltd.
- IOPX - Iowa Power and Light Company; MidAmerican Energy Company
- IORY - Indiana and Ohio Railway
- IPBX - INNOPHOS, Inc
- IPCU - Independent Container Line
- IPCX - International Paper
- IPEX - Indeck Power Equipment Company
- IPLX - Illinois Power Company
- IPOX - A and R Leasing, LLP
- IPPX - Intermountain Power Agency
- IPSX - Midwest Energy Services Company; General American Marks Company
- IPWX - Interstate Power Company; Alliant Energy
- IQIX - Industria Quimica Del letmo, SA de CV
- IR - Illinois RailNet
- IREX - IRECO, Inc.
- IRLX - Western Railroad Supply, Inc.
- IRMX - Illinois Railway Museum
- IRMZ - III Transportation
- IRN - Conrail
- IRRC - Iowa Railroad
- IRRS - International Rail Road Systems, Inc.
- IRSZ - Interpool/Rail Services, Ltd.
- IRTX - Inter-Rail Transport
- ISCU - I.S.C. Chemicals, Ltd.
- ISCX - ISC, Inc.
- ISG - ISG Railways
- ISIZ - Intermodal Services, Inc.
- ISLU - Islandia, Ltd.
- ISPX - Western Company of North America
- ISR - Iowa Southern Railroad
- ISRR - Indiana Southern Railroad
- ISSR - ISS Rail, Inc.
- ISSU - Iceland Steamship Company, Ltd.
- ISU - Iowa Southern Utilities (Southern Industrial Railroad)
- ISW - Indiana Southwestern Railway
- ITAU - Italian Line
- ITAX - Illinois Transit Assembly, Inc.
- ITB - Illinois Terminal Belt
- ITC - Illinois Terminal Railroad; Norfolk and Western Railroad; Norfolk Southern
- ITCU - Intercontainer
- ITCX - International Technologies Corporation
- ITDX - SULCOM, Inc.
- ITEU - Compagnia Italiana Investimenti Alternativi
- ITFX - Infinity Transportation
- ITGX - ITG, Inc.
- ITIU - International Transchem, Inc.
- ITIX - Intermodal Technologies, Inc.
- ITKU - Intertank, Ltd.
- ITLU - Itel Containers International Corporation
- ITLX - GE Rail Services Corporation
- ITRU - Itel Containers International Corporation
- ITSU - Iberhansaetic Transport System
- ITSZ - International Transportation Service, Inc.
- ITTX - Trailer Train Company, TTX Company
- ITXX - Tiaxcalteca de Industrias, SA de CV
- IU - Indianapolis Union
- IVCX - Invista S.A.R.L.
- IVLU - Ivarans Rederei, A/S
- IXEU - Interox Quimica, SA
- IXWU - Interox Chemicals, Ltd.
