= IVM =

- In vitro maturation
- Protein Data Bank (PDB) ligand code for ivermectin
- Innoson Vehicle Manufacturing, in Nigeria
- Incremental view maintenance in database theory and database systems

== See also ==
- IVM Podcasts, a podcasting company in India.
