= IRGC (disambiguation) =

The IRGC is the Islamic Revolutionary Guard Corps, a branch of the Iranian Armed Forces.

IRGC may also refer to:

- IRGC (gene), a gene in humans
- International Risk Governance Center, a foundation in Switzerland
