= ICRS =

ICRS may refer to:

- International Cannabinoid Research Society, professional society for cannabinoid researchers
- International Celestial Reference System, the IAU standard celestial reference system
- Institute of Corporate Responsibility and Sustainability, professional body for sustainability practitioners
- Intrastromal corneal ring segment, an eye implant for vision correction
- International Castle Research Society
