= IAB =

IAB may refer to:

== Organisations ==
- Institute of Architects Bangladesh, a professional organisation for architects in Bangladesh
- Interactive Advertising Bureau, for the online advertising industry
- Internal Affairs Bureau, part of the New York City Police Department, US
- International Agrarian Bureau or Green International, based in Prague, Czech Republic
- Institute of Accountants and Bookkeepers, UK
- International Association of Bryologists, promoting bryology (the study of mosses, liverworts, and hornworts)
- Internet Advertising Bureau, a UK trade association
- Internet Architecture Board, a committee of the Internet Engineering Task Force (IETF)
- Islami Andolan Bangladesh, political party in Bangladesh
- Israel Association of Baseball, to promote and develop baseball in Israel

== Air force bases ==
- Isa Air Base, Bahrain
- McConnell Air Force Base (IATA airport code), Wichita, Kansas, US

== Science and technology ==
- IAB meteorite, a group of iron meteorites
- Individual Address Block, in computer networking

== Other uses ==
- International Accounting Bulletin, a UK accountancy publication
