= IRN =

IRN may refer to:

- Input-referred noise
- Independent Radio News, a news service to commercial radio stations in the United Kingdom
- Independent Radio News (New Zealand), not affiliated with the United Kingdom company above
- Institute of Registries and Notary, a government agency in Portugal responsible for civil registry and citizenship
- International Rivers Network, a non-profit environmental organization based in California, United States
- Imperial Russian Navy, the navy of the Russian Empire
- Iran (ISO 3166-1 alpha-3 country code)
- Indian-ringnecked parakeet (abbreviated IRN), the subspecies Psittacula krameri manillensis of the rose-ringed parakeet
- Islamic Council Norway, Islamsk Råd Norge
- Italian Royal Navy, the navy of the Kingdom of Italy
