= IMU =

IMU may refer to:

== Science and technology ==
- Inertial measurement unit, a device that measures acceleration and rotation, used for example to maneuver modern vehicles including motorcycles, missiles, air- and spacecraft

== Businesses and organizations ==
- I Measure U, a New Zealand company that develops inertial measurement units
- Indiana Memorial Union, on the Indiana University Bloomington campus
- International Mathematical Union
- Irish Medical Union, since renamed the Irish Medical Organisation
- Islamic Movement of Uzbekistan, Afghan Militant group
- Italian Mathematical Union

== Education ==
- Indian Maritime University, a public university in India
- Inner Mongolia University, a public university in China
- International Medical University, a private university in Malaysia
- Istanbul Medeniyet University, a public university in Turkey
- Istanbul Medipol University, a private university in Turkey
- Iwate Medical University, a private university in Japan

== Other uses ==
- Initial markup, in business
- Intensive Management Unit, a type of prison in the United States, usually practicing solitary confinement
- Interurban Multiple Units, used by Queensland Rail

== See also ==
- Imu, a type of underground oven used in Hawaiian cooking
- Nerona Imu, a fictional character in the manga and anime series One Piece
