= IITM =

IITM is an acronym that may refer to:

- Image Institute of Technology & Management
- Indian Institute of Technology Madras
- Indian Institute of Tropical Meteorology
