= Száraz-ér =

Száraz-ér Ier
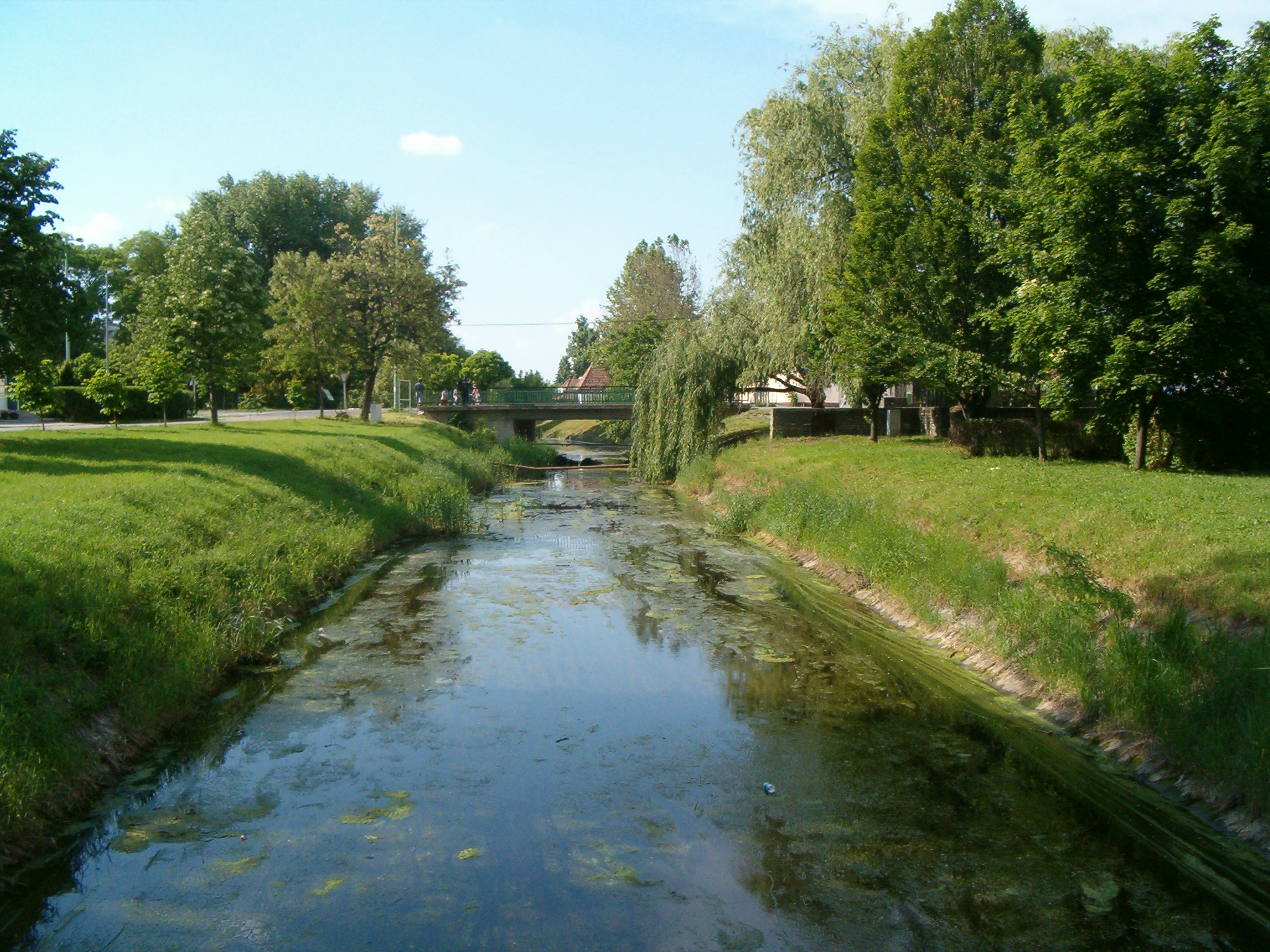
- Száraz-ér at Battonya

- Location within Hungary Location within Romania

Location
- Countries: Romania and Hungary
- Counties: Arad; Békes; Csongrád
- Towns: Arad; Battonya; Tótkomlós

Physical characteristics
- Mouth: Mureș
  - location: Makó
  - coordinates: 46.1809°N 20.5370°E

Basin features
- Progression: Mureș→ Tisza→ Danube→ Black Sea

The Száraz-ér (Romanian: Ier) is a right tributary of the river Mureș in Romania and Hungary. It discharges into the Mureș near Makó. It originates in the city of Arad and flows westwards crossing the border into Hungary near the village of Turnu. It flows through the towns Battonya and Tótkomlós before it enters the Mureș east of Makó. The river is entirely channelized and is integrated into the drainage system of the area.

== Hydronymy ==
The Hungarian name of the river means "(dry) brook". The Romanian name derives from that.
