= I, Q (book series) =

Book series by Roland Smith

- Author: Roland Smith, Michael P. Spradlin
- Original title: I, Q
- Country: United States
- Language: English
- Genre: young adults' mystery, spy
- Publisher: Sleeping Bear Press; Scholastic Press
- Published: 2008-2014
- Media type: Paperback, hardcover, PDF, ePub, hosted eBook

I, Q is a series of young adult fiction mystery books. The first three are written by Roland Smith and the rest are co-written by Smith and Michael P. Spradlin. They concern a thirteen-year-old boy named "Quest" – whose nickname is "Q" – and whose parents are well-known rock musicians. He and his stepsister Angela get involved with the U.S. Secret Service and the Israeli Mossad and are protected by Tyrone Boone and his group SOS (save our souls).

== Books ==
No.	Title	Author	Date	ISBN
1	Independence Hall	Roland Smith	August 27, 2008	978-1585363254
The first book in the series, Independence Hall, begins at the wedding when Q's mom and Angela's dad get married in California . The family then leaves for a year-long concert tour around America. However, they are being watched. They meet Boone, a cowboy, and their lives will never be the same again. They meet other people working for the Secret Service and they are trying to find out why they want Angela. In Book One: Independence Hall, we met Q and his stepsister, Angela. We also met their pop star parents, Blaze and Roger; the SOS team protecting the family; and we met the main players of the Mossad team that is following them. They include Eben, who wants to avenge his brother; Carma and Devorah, who work for Eben; and Ziv, who started out working for Eben but was actually working for Malak, Angela's supposedly dead mother, or Anmar, Malak's twin sister. We also learn that Angela's mother, Malak Tucker, is still alive and it was her twin sister Anmar, a terrorist known as "the Leopard", that died in the explosion at Independence Hall, posing as her dead sister. In the end Anglela and Q find Malak and find out that Dirk Peski is an agent for Malak and Ziv works to protect Malak
2	The White House	Roland Smith	June 23, 2009	978-1585364565
In this book, Q (Quest) and Angela make it to the White House in Washington, D.C. to find that it is even harder to determine who is "good" and "bad" guys than ever before. Bethany, the presidents daughter, gets kidnapped.
3	Kitty Hawk	Roland Smith	September 1, 2012	978-1585366040
In this book, Q and Angela, along with the rest of the SOS team, are trying to save Bethany (the president's daughter) from the ghost cell's clutches. Meanwhile, Malak, a.k.a. The Leopard, is rising up higher and higher in the ghost cell's ranks. But will she be able to take them down? Combine a raging storm, car bombs, and an agile dog, and you have I, Q, Kitty Hawk. Q and Angela are kidnapped.
4	The Alamo	Roland Smith and Michael P. Spradlin	July 1, 2013	978-1585368211
Continuing the fast-paced adventure series, Q and Angela now know each other's strengths and weakness so they can foil the spies and kidnappers who continue to pursue them while they travel with their parents on a rock concert tour across the U.S. The step brother and sister now have the help of the U. S. President, J. R. Culpepper, and his son, Willingham Culpepper, or P.K. (President's Kid) for short. The president has given them special watches with his secret number engraved on them in case of an emergency. Q and Angela hope they will not have to use that number, but in this book they may have to. Meanwhile, P.K. researches in the White House archives for clues about the mysterious Boone, who is the head security guard and roadie on the tour but also supervises a secretive group of former spies who have the technology, intelligence, persistence, and muscle-power to continue to thwart the mysterious Ghost Cell. The adventures continue as the spies take Angela's mother (disguised as The Leopard, a sinister spy) to San Antonio to the ranch of one of the top five spies in the mysterious Ghost Cell. The rock concert continues to San Antonio as well where the parents, in the chart topping rock group Match, are going to hold a free concert in front of the legendary Alamo historic site. They eventually find out the ghost cell is attacking from Hancoak towere with chemical weapons and disable the treat with Croc Blinking. Description from Amazon: Fresh off a "too close" encounter with the terrorist group, the Ghost Cell, in Kitty Hawk, North Carolina, Q and Angela head to San Antonio, Texas. As their parents' band, Match, prepares for a concert at the Alamo, the two discover that the Ghost Cell has its tentacles everywhere, including the Lone Star State. With each passing hour, Q and Angela uncover more clues and discover more leads. And the mysterious Boone and his SOS group leave them with more questions than answers, for there is much more to Boone than meets the eye. With time running out to stop another Ghost Cell attack, Angela and Q and the others begin to wonder. Are they following the Ghost Cell or is the Ghost Cell following them?
5	The Windy City	Roland Smith and Michael P. Spradlin	January 1, 2014	978-1585368242
Q and Angela finish their mission in San Antonio, and head to Chicago.
6	Alcatraz	Roland Smith and Michael P. Spradlin	September 1, 2014	978-1585368259
Q and Angela continue their race to San Francisco to find Number One, the leader of the Ghost Cell, a terrorist organization. They go through hardships finding out that Boone was a templar knight that was affected by the Holy Grail, which gives a user the power of extreme speed through "Blinking". They find out that Speed, Quest's dad, is the leader of the Ghost Cell and knock him unconscious on Alcatraz Island.
