= IY =

IY, I-Y, or iY may refer to:

- Imperial Yeomanry, a British cavalry force (1899–1908)
- InuYasha, a long-running manga and anime series by Rumiko Takahashi
- Saudi–Iraqi neutral zone (FIPS 10-4 digram; obsolete since 1993)
- Ito-Yokado, a Japanese general merchandise store, member of the Seven & I Holdings Co. (IY-Group)
- Merchandise Store, which is a member of IY-Group
- Yemenia (IATA airline designator)
- Generation iY, the demographic cohort following Generation X, specifically referring to those born after 1990
- Invincible Youth, a South Korean variety show
