= IDR =

IDR may refer to:

- Indonesian rupiah, by ISO 4217 currency code
- Devi Ahilyabai Holkar International Airport, Indore, India, by IATA code
- Instantaneous Decoding Refresh in H.264/MPEG-4 AVC video, see Network Abstraction Layer
- Incentive Distribution Rights, see Master limited partnership
- Idiosyncratic drug reaction, a type of adverse drug reaction that is specific to an individual
- Independence Day: Resurgence, 2016 film
- Indian Depository Receipt, a financial instrument
- Inner Distribution Road, a ring road in Reading, Berkshire, UK
- International Depository Receipt, a negotiable security
- Iskandar Development Region, the southern development corridor in Johor, Malaysia
- Jane's International Defence Review, a monthly magazine reporting on military news and technology
- In Death Reborn, album by Army of the Pharaohs
- Volkswagen I.D. R
