= IPB =

IPB can refer to one of the following:

- Bogor Agricultural University (Institut Pertanian Bogor), an agricultural institute in Indonesia
- Intelligence preparation of the battlespace, US Field Manual FM 3.05-301
- International Peace Bureau
- Investiční a poštovní banka, Czech bank
- Invision Power Board
- UK Investigatory Powers Bill
- Isolated-phase bus
- Italian Peoples Bakery, a bakery based in Trenton, New Jersey
- Leibniz Institute of Plant Biochemistry, research institute in Halle, Germany
- Presbyterian Church of Brazil (Igreja Presbiteriana do Brasil), a Brazilian Protestant church
- UPLB Institute of Plant Breeding at the University of the Philippines, Los Baños
- IPB compression, a method of video compression using I-frames, P-frames and B-frames
