= Institute of Economic Development =

UK professional association

Institute of Economic Development (IED) is a UK representative body for economic development and regeneration professionals.

IED was founded in 1986, largely to represent the interests of local authority economic development officers. The membership organisation is now one of the UK’s leading independent professional bodies representing economic development and regeneration practitioners working for local and regional communities. The IED membership is a valuable network of economic development professionals from both the private and public sectors.

It is a non-profit organization run by a Board elected by its membership. Board members are each elected for a three-year term. Details of Board members and branch representatives can be found on the IED website.

IED exists to represent the views of its members and the interests of the economic development and regeneration sector more generally. It also sets standards of professional conduct and offers certified education and training as well as continuing professional development.

There are four categories of membership: Student, Associate, Full and Fellow. The criteria for each category are published on the IED website and acceptance of all membership application requires the approval of the Board.

IED's current Chair is Dawn Hudd, Head of Commercial and Economic Development at Maidstone Borough Council and its Vice Chair is Mark Pearson, Chief Executive of Surrey Connects.

Copies of IED responses to government consultations and other submissions to government are published on the IED website. This also contains other information that may be of interest to those employed in economic development/regeneration or considering a career in the sector. IED also publishes a Directory of Consultants and regular e-bulletins, both of which are freely available.
