= IHR =

IHR may stand for:

- Indian Himalayan Region, the Indian part of Himalaya
- Institute for Historical Review, an American Holocaust denial organization
- Institute of Historical Research, an educational institution forming part of the University of London
- International Health Regulations, a set of legally binding regulations to limit the spread of disease
