= Indian Ocean Territory =

Indian Ocean Territory may refer to one of two administrative units in the Indian Ocean:

- Australian Indian Ocean Territories (AIOT), two island groups under Australian sovereignty:
  - Christmas Island
  - Cocos (Keeling) Islands
- British Indian Ocean Territory (BIOT), an overseas territory of the United Kingdom.

== See also ==
- Indian Territory, a historical territory in the United States of America
- States and union territories of India
