= Ita Kozakeviča =

Polish journalist and politician (1955–1990)

- Ita Maria Kozakiewicz
- Born: July 3, 1955; Riga, Latvian SSR, Soviet Union
- Died: October 28, 1990 (aged 35); Gaeta, Italy
- Education: Pēteris Stučka Latvian State University
- Occupation: Philologist

Ita Marija Kozakeviča (Polish: Ita Maria Kozakiewicz; 3 July 1955 – 28 October 1990) was a Latvian Polish philologist, journalist and social worker.

== Biography ==
Born in Riga, 3 July 1955, Kozakeviča was a graduate of Latvian State University, specializing in French Philology. She later worked in publishing as an editor, journalist, and translator of numerous works, because she was able to speak Latvian, French, Russian, Polish, Spanish, German, Belarusian, Ukrainian and Georgian.

In 1988, she was elected as President of the newly-established Union of Poles in Latvia, and was one of the Latvian SSR People's Forum organizers in December 1988, which later became the Latvian National Culture Societies Association. In 1989 she was elected as a board member of the City Council of Riga, and was elected to the Supreme Council of the Republic of Latvia, representing the Popular Front of Latvia, where she was responsible for human rights issues.

On 28 October 1990, while visiting Italy, Kozakēviča drowned swimming in the Tyrrhenian Sea off the town of Gaeta, two days before she was due to meet the Pope at the Worldwide Polish Society Conference at the Vatican. She was buried at St. Michael Cemetery in Riga.

In May 2023, on the initiative of the Polish-born member of the Riga City Council Miroslav Koda, a desire to name a street in Riga after I. Kozakević was publicly voiced. A street in Riga (Itas Kozakevičas iela) was named after her in August 2023.
