= IBD =

IBD may refer to:

== Medicine ==
- Inflammatory bowel disease, a group of inflammatory conditions of the large and small intestines

== Organisations ==
- Investment Banking Division, a department of an investment bank
- Independent Bicycle Dealers, a small bicycle business
- Institute of Brewing and Distilling, an international industry trade association

== Science ==
- Identity by descent, alleles that are identical because they descended directly from the same ancestral allele
- Inclusion body disease, a destructive virus occurring in boid snakes
- Infectious bursal disease, a poultry disease causing immunosuppression
- Inverse beta decay, a nuclear reaction commonly used in neutrino detectors
- Iodobenzene dichloride, a reagent used in organic chemistry
- Ion beam deposition

== Other ==
- International Beer Day, an August 5 celebration
- India's Best Dancer, a dance reality show
- Investor's Business Daily, a national newspaper in the United States
