= INLA =

INLA or similar may refer to:

- Integrated nested Laplace approximations, a method for approximate Bayesian inference
- InlA, one form of the Internalin surface protein found on Listeria monocytogenes
- Iraq National Library and Archive
- Irish National Liberation Army, an Irish republican socialist paramilitary group formed during the Troubles
- Ladakh, India (ISO 3166 code IN-LA)
- State Department Air Wing, also called INL/A (International Narcotics and Law Enforcement Affairs Air Wing)
