= IVL =

IVL may refer to:

- The IATA code for Ivalo Airport
- Involucrin, a human gene
- Ilmailuvoimien Lentokonetehdas, a Finnish defense, aviation and aerospace company
- Indian Volley League, a professional volleyball league in India
- Julius (nomen), Roman gens
- Intravascular lymphomas, rare cancers in which malignant lymphocytes proliferate and accumulate within blood vessels
