= Infinity War (disambiguation) =

Avengers: Infinity War is a 2018 American superhero film.

Infinity War may also refer to:

- The Infinity War, a 1992 comic book storyline
- Infinity Wars, a 2018 comic book storyline
- Infinity War (event), the fictional war depicted in the film
- Infinity Wars, a 2014 digital trading card game
