= IRINN =

IRINN may mean:

- Islamic Republic of Iran News Network
- Indian Registry for Internet Names and Numbers
