= ISIL (disambiguation) =

ISIL is the Islamic State of Iraq and the Levant (self-styled "Islamic State"), a militant Islamic group operating primarily in Iraq and Syria.

ISIL or Isil may also refer to:

== Identifiers ==
- International Standard Identifier for Libraries and Related Organizations, a standard for identifying organizations

== Organizations ==
- International Society for Individual Liberty, now known as Liberty International, a libertarian educational organization based in the United States
- Indian Society of International Law, an institution for the teaching, research and promotion of International Law in India

== Other uses ==
- Işıl, a feminine Turkish given name
- Information Structure Identification Language, based on GML

== See also ==
- ISIL-KP, or the Islamic State of Iraq and the Levant – Khorasan Province, an offshoot of the ISIL operating primarily in Afghanistan and South Asia
