= IWBank =

Italian online bank

IWBank S.p.A.
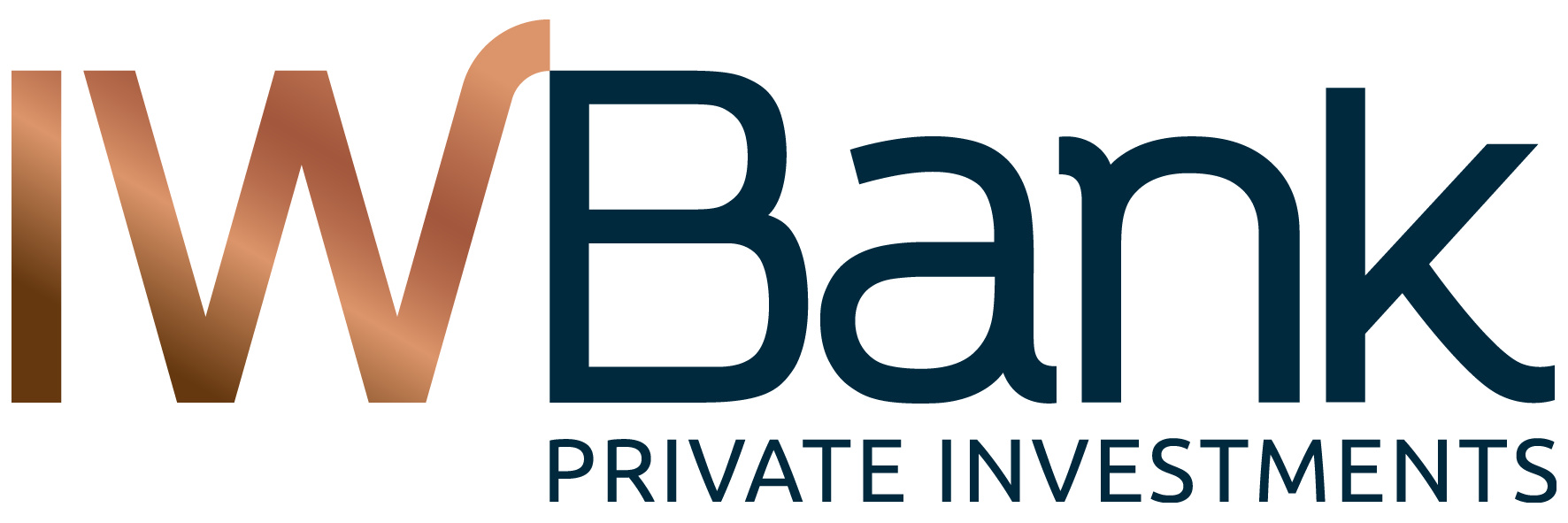
- Company type: Public
- Industry: Banking
- Founded: 1999
- Headquarters: Milan, Italy
- Key people: Dario Di Muro (CEO)
- Products: Banking stock brokerage Lease
- Revenue: € 85 million (2016)
- Number of employees: 305 (2016)
- Website: www.iwbank.it

IWBank S.p.A. is an Italian online bank owned by Intesa Sanpaolo. The bank characterises its offer for economic convenience and high technological content.

== History ==
The bank originated from @Imiweb Sim, that Imi Bank started in 1999 as a trading service for its customers. In 2001 it became a bank with the name of Imiweb Bank.

In 2003 Centrobanca (BPU Group investment bank) took over 80% of Imiweb Bank, changing the name in IWBank and achieving an even balance. The management acquired a 29% stake in 2004 and the offer was extended.
