= Interocular transfer =

Phenomenon of visual perception

Interocular transfer (IOT) is a phenomenon of visual perception in which information available to one eye will produce an effect in the other eye. For example, the state of adaptation of one eye can have a small effect on the state of light adaptation of the other. Aftereffects induced through one eye can be measured through the other.

IOT can occur in various tasks involving motion aftereffects (MAE), depth perception (stereopsis) and visual learning. Some of the pioneering research in IOT also hypothesizes its process and location of occurrence, though there is no actual evidence that localizes the process of IOT.

Most of the early research in interocular transfer introduces the role of binocular neurons in the process of interocular transfer, the role of adaptation in the IOT process occurring in motion aftereffects (MAE), and use of IOT in determining the stereoscopic vision in those with visual disorders like amblyopia (lazy eye syndrome) and strabismus.

== Research ==
The groundwork for interocular transfer research began after Hubel and Wiesel's (1962) study on understanding the binocular interaction in visual cortex. Their research laid the foundation for further interocular research by studying the neurons in the cat's visual cortex when stimuli is presented to both eyes (binocular neurons). Their study provided a crucial step in understanding how brain integrates visual information from both eyes. One of the earliest research on interocular transfer was conducted by Wolfgang Kohler in 1917 where one of the chickens' eyes used in the experiment were patched shut. Interocular transfer was observed between the eyes of the chicken who were made to discriminate gray colored sheets of varying brightness.

Binocular Vision Assisted by Binocular Neurons

Two hypothesis to explain the occurrence of interocular transfer have been advanced - the retinal locus hypothesis and sensorimotor integration hypothesis. The retinal locus hypothesis attempted to explain the occurrence of interocular transfer when the stimuli are presented in the dorsotemporal part of the retina. The sensorimotor integration hypothesis to their study proposed that pigeons can transfer information depending on whether the response key and the visual stimulus are presented in the same location.

=== Motion aftereffects ===
Motion aftereffect is a phenomenon that causes a visual stimuli to undergo apparent motion. A prolonged exposure to motion of a stimulus in a particular direction causes a perception of motion in the opposite direction. The middle temporal area (known as MT or V5), is associated with motion aftereffects.

Interocular transfer occurs in the relational-motion detectors, which are of the binocular or monocular class. The study confirms the presence on interocular transfer of MAE, and localizes the adaptation for MAE in either an individual's eye, or the brain areas which combine the information from both set of eyes.

A neural model for interocular transfer to explain its occurrence in motion aftereffects has been developed. In a pool of many neurons, some are adapted to a specific visual stimulus (like a certain orientation of lines) and some are not. This model suggests that all these neurons somehow combine their information, allowing transfer of information between the two eyes. This means that all the adapted and unadapted neurons contribute to a process where information is pooled together and transferred.

The visual aftereffects in the unstimulated eye occurred due to the merging of the monocular visual fields of the two eyes, and not due to one central origin of vision. The study supplies two experiments. In the first experimental study, one eye was stimulated with a colored patch on a white background while the other eye remained closed. After sometime, when the covered eye was uncovered, a negative after-image was perceived by the unstimulated eye. This inferenced the merging of the monocular visual fields, rather than transfer from the stimulated to unstimulated eye. The second experimental study asked participants to fix the uncovered right eye to the left of a moving stimulus on a homogenous background, while the left eye remained closed. Then, the participants were asked to uncover their left eye and focus attention slightly to the right of the moving stimulus, while keeping the stimulated right eye covered. The after-effect was seldom observed. Here, the authors again argued that the effect is observed due to a merging of the monocular visual cues, and not due to the transfer of information between the two hemispheres of the brain.

=== In adaptation ===
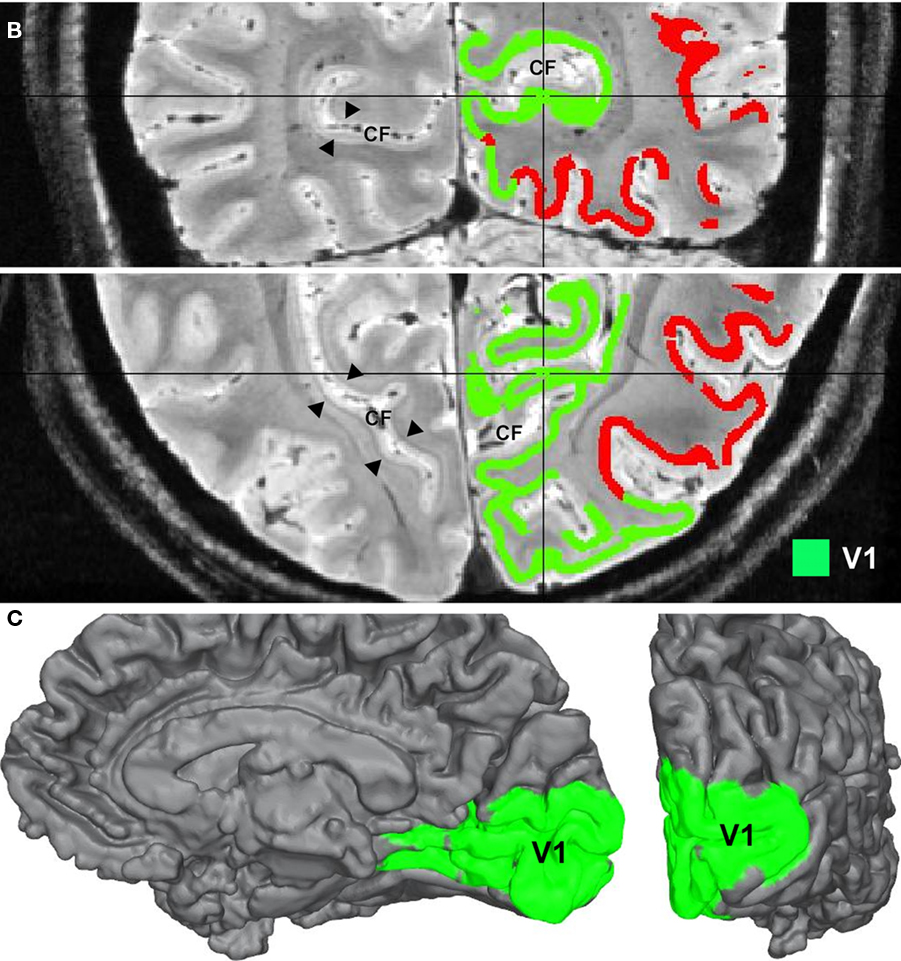
The Human Visual Cortex

Adaptation is caused by the prolonged viewing of unchanging patterns. IOT in adaptation within the primary visual cortex has been explored. IOT as the ability to experience aftereffects in the eye that did not view the adapting pattern occurring in the primary visual cortex (V1) of cats. IOT may be mediated by callosal connections between the two hemispheres, and is not dependent on the conventional binocularity of neurons. The study attempted to provide the physiological evidence to the existence of IOT. There is also FMRI evidence that observed binocular visual interactions in the visual cortex in humans.

=== Stereopsis ===
The visual experience on the development of binocularity in the visual cortex. Stereoscopic vision is absent in people with amblyopia and strabismus. When IOT of the tilt aftereffect was investigated for binocularity, it was found that normal subjects have a high degree of interocular transfer, while strabismic subjects have very little.

== Applications ==
Interocular transfer is shown to be a catalyst in the process of rehabilitation in patients suffering from amblyopia (lazy eye). The use of virtual reality games strengthens the interocular transfer between the two eyes of an amblyopic patient, leading to an enhanced visual acuity, contrast sensitivity and stereopsis in the amblyopic patient. This occurs because the amblyopic eye and fellow eye share the same neural pathways. Thus, when the fellow eye is stimulated through exposure to the VR game, it creates new connections, and strengthens the connects in this pathways. This leads to eventual improvements in vision in the amblyopic eye.
