= IHH =

IHH may refer to:

- IHH Healthcare
- IHH (protein), a protein which in humans is encoded by the IHH gene
- IHH (Turkish NGO), an Islamic Turkish NGO active in more than 100 countries
- I Heart Huckabees, a 2004 philosophical comedy film
- Internationale Humanitäre Hilfsorganisation e.V., an international aid association based in Frankfurt
- Isolated hypogonadotropic hypogonadism
