= ISU =

ISU may refer to:

== Schools ==
=== United States ===
- Idaho State University, Pocatello, Idaho
- Illinois State University, Normal, Illinois
- Illinois State University (Springfield, Illinois)
- Indiana State University, Terre Haute, Indiana
- Iowa State University, Ames, Iowa

=== Elsewhere ===
- I-Shou University, Kaohsiung, Taiwan
- Ifugao State University, in the Philippines
- Ilia State University, in Tbilisi, Georgia
- Imo State University
- Ingush State University, in Magas, Republic of Ingushetia
- International School of Uganda, Kampala, Uganda
- International School of Ulaanbaatar, Mongolia
- International Solomon University, in Ukraine
- International Space University, Illkirch-Graffenstaden, France
- Irkutsk State University, in Eastern Siberia

== Organizations ==
- ISU (trade union), British trade union formerly known as the Immigration Service Union
- Integrated Security Unit, in Canada
- Internal Security Unit, the counter-intelligence unit of the Provisional Irish Republican Army (IRA)
- International Seamen's Union
- International Skating Union

== Other ==
- Italian Service Units, Italian prisoner of war army units that served on the Allied side during World War II
- ISU (singer)
- Isu language (Bantu), also called Suwu or Subu, a Bantu language of Cameroon
- Isu language, a Grassfields Bantu language of Cameroon
- Isu, Nigeria, a local government area of Imo State
- Isu people, an ethnic group in Nigeria
- Isu station, on the Seoul Metropolitan Subway
- ISU-152, ISU-122, Soviet self-propelled guns
- SAP IS-U, Industry Specific Solution for Utilities
- International System of Units, the SI system
- ISU, the IATA airport code for Sulaimaniyah International Airport, Iraq
