= ICV =

ICV may stand for:

== Companies and organizations ==
- ICVolunteers, non-profit organisation headquartered in Geneva, Switzerland
- Islamic Council of Victoria, representing Muslims in Victoria, Australia
- International Congress of Vexillology
- Initiative for Catalonia Greens, a political party of Catalonia
- Cargolux Italia (ICAO airline designator)

== Medicine ==
- Influenza C virus, one of the pathogens causing influenza
- Internal cerebral veins, a pair of veins that runs through the brain
- International certificate of vaccination, see Carte Jaune
- Intracerebroventricular (ICV) injection, a medicinal route of administration
- Intracranial volume, the volume in the cranium, including the brain, meninges, and CSF

== Other uses ==
- Integrity check value, another name for a checksum
- Interval count vector in music theory, see Interval vector
- Infantry combat vehicle, see infantry fighting vehicle
