= ICMP (disambiguation) =

ICMP is the Internet Control Message Protocol, used in computer networking. It may also refer to:

- International Collection of Microorganisms from Plants, a culture collection in New Zealand
- International Commission on Missing Persons, an intergovernmental organization
- International Congress on Mathematical Physics
- Ischemic cardiomyopathy, a type of heart disease
