= IMR =

IMR may refer to:

== Organisations ==
- Imperial Military Railways, of British forces in South Africa 1898-1901
- Isle of Man Railway
- Industrija Motora Rakovica
- International Mineral Resources
- Institute for Materials Research, or Kinken in Japan
- Institute of Marine Research, in Norway
- International Marketing Review

== Science, technology and engineering ==
- Infant mortality rate
- Interrupt mask register, in computing is used to disable interrupts
- Interlocking machine room of the London Underground signalling system
- Inverse Mills ratio, in statistics and graphs
- Improved military rifle powder, a type of gunpowder
- IMR vessel (Inspection, Maintenance and Repair)
- Immediate mode rendering

== Other uses ==
- Ideomotor response, in hypnosis and psychological research
- Individual ministerial responsibility, a political convention in Parliamentary systems of Government
- Institutional mode of representation, in film theory
- In Medias Res (band), Vancouver, Canada
- International Migration Review, quarterly peer-reviewed academic journal published by Wiley-Blackwell

== See also ==
- IMR-1, 2, and 3, armored engineering vehicles (Inzhenernaya mashina razgrazhdeniya), based on the Russian T-55, T-72, and T-90 tanks, respectively
