= IRM =

IRM or Irm may refer to:

- IERS Reference Meridian
- Illinois Railway Museum
- Illinois Reserve Militia, state defense force active during World War II
- Bureau of Information Resource Management, responsible for information technology of the U.S. Department of State
- Information Rights Management
- Intermediate Restorative Material (Dentistry) Zinc oxide eugenol
- L'Institut Royal Météorologique de Belgique
- Interference reflection microscopy, a microscopy method used to image adherent cells
- Internal Revenue Manual, an official compendium of internal guidelines for personnel of the United States Internal Revenue Service
- International Review of Mission, a quarterly academic journal
- International Roaming MIN assigned by IFAST
- IRM (album), by Charlotte Gainsbourg
- Iron Mountain Incorporated, a data storage company based in Boston, Massachusetts
- ICAO designator for Mahan Air, an Iranian airline
- Islamic Republic of Mauritania
- Irish Republican Movement
- The upper course of the German river Aid (Würm)

== See also ==
- 1RM
