= IVI =

IVI or Ivi may refer to:

== Businesses and organizations ==
- IVI Foundation, specifiers of instrument drivers
- International Vaccine Institute, international vaccine research organization
- Ivi, Inc., American corporation with a software application providing live video streaming
- Ivi.ru, Russian video streaming service

== People ==
- Ivi (footballer) (Iván López Álvarez, born 1994), Spanish footballer
- Ivi Adamou (born 1993), Greek Cypriot singer
- Ivi Eenmaa (born 1943), Estonian politician
- Ivi Kreen (born 1935), Estonian television presenter
- Ivi Monteiro (born 1984), Brazilian swimmer

== Science and technology ==
- Importance Value Index, in ecology
- Ion vibration current, in physics
- IVI Translation, a stateless IPv4/IPv6 translation technique
- In-vehicle infotainment, or in-car entertainment

== Other uses ==
- Ivi, Fijian name for Inocarpus fagifer, a species of tree
