= IAD =

IAD or Iad may stand for:

== Organisations and businesses ==
- AirAsia India, ICAO airline code IAD
- Internal affairs (law enforcement), or Internal Affairs Division (IAD), the police agency division that investigates possible misconduct
- Inter-American Dialogue, or IAD, a non-profit organization in Washington, D.C.
- International Automotive Design, or IAD, a British car manufacturer
- Iraqi Army Division, or IAD

== Places, airport codes ==
- Iad (river), a tributary of the Crișul Repede in Bihor County, Romania
- Iad, a tributary of the Bistrița (Someș) in Bistrița-Năsăud County, Romania
- Livezile, Bistrița-Năsăud, Romania, Livezile Commune was formerly called Iad
- Washington Dulles International Airport, IATA airport code IAD

== Technology ==
- iAd, a mobile advertising service operated by Apple Inc.
- Integrated access device, or IAD
- Intelligent Assist Device (robotics), or IAD
- Internet addiction disorder, or IAD

== Other uses ==
- Institutional analysis and development framework, or IAD, a systematic method in policy analysis
- Instructor-assisted deployment, or IAD, a parachute deployment method for student skydivers
- Interaction design, or IAD
- International Air Distress, or IAD, a radio frequency
- Intramolecular aglycon delivery, or IAD, a stereospecific glycosylation technique in organic carbohydrate chemistry
- International Asexuality Day, or IAD, a day of celebration for asexual people
