= IAQ =

IAQ, a three letter acronym, may refer to:

- Indoor air quality
- Infrequently Asked Questions, FAQs for fictional video games
