= Internet Defense League =

The Internet Defense League
- Website type: Political activism
- Available in: English
- Owner: Fight For the Future
- Website: internetdefenseleague.org
- Commercial: No
- Registration: None
- Launched: 19 July 2012; 14 years ago
- Current status: Online

The Internet Defense League is an organization and network launched in March 2012 with the aim of organizing protests and other responses to perceived threats to Internet freedom and the open Internet. It was formed following the protests against SOPA and PIPA. It had 30,000 members as of 2013, consisting of organizations, websites, and individuals.

== History ==
The Internet Defense League site is a creation of the Fight for the Future nonprofit, a group noted for its participation in the anti-SOPA protests of 2011, and Reddit co-founder Alexis Ohanian. The IDL officially launched on 19 July 2012. It held launch events in San Francisco, New York City, Washington, D.C., London, and Ulaanbaatar.

The IDL received early support from the Mozilla Foundation, WordPress, Reddit, the Cheezburger Network, the Electronic Frontier Foundation, Public Knowledge, OpenCongress, Grooveshark, Imgur, Fark, the Tor Project, La Quadrature du Net, and the Center for Democracy and Technology. Wikipedia considered joining the IDL. At launch, it received endorsements from members of U.S. Congress, including Darrell Issa, Ron Wyden, and Jerry Moran.

The IDL opposes CISPA, and in 2013, the IDL was active in organizing against it. Over thirty thousand websites joined their call to oppose it. After the death of Aaron Swartz, they also supported reforming the Computer Fraud and Abuse Act.

In July 2013, they organized the "Restore the Fourth" campaign, in reference to the fourth amendment to the U.S. Constitution, to protest government surveillance. Thousands of websites participated in the event. They called for laws governing surveillance to be amended, and for Internet users to contact members of U.S. Congress to investigate NSA surveillance programs. They also called for websites to publish the full text of the fourth amendment. In 2015, the organization again protested NSA surveillance.

== Website ==
According to Tiffiniy Cheng, co-founder of Fight for the Future, the aim of the Defense League site is to sign up thousands of websites, from large organizations to bloggers, who can be mobilized quickly if needed for future anti-piracy legislation protests. They use a "cat signal", inspired by the Bat-Signal. Speaking to CNN about why they chose a cat as their symbol, Cheng said, "There's this academic theory ... that talks about if you ban the ability of people to share cat photos, they'll start protesting en masse". The digital signal is added to supportive websites as a web widget, drawing attention to current protests supported by the IDL.

The site's slogan is "Make sure the Internet never loses. Ever."

== See also ==
- SOPA opposition
- Cute cat theory of digital activism
