= IND =

Ind or IND may refer to:

== General ==
- Independent (politician), a politician not affiliated to any political party
- Independent station, used within television program listings and the television industry for a station that is not affiliated with any network
- Independent Subway System, a former rapid transit rail system in New York City that is now part of the New York City Subway
  - B Division (New York City Subway), further subdivided into the BMT Division (B1) and the IND Division (B2)
- International Nurses Day, celebrated in early May of each year to mark the contributions nurses make to society

== Science and technology ==
- Improvised nuclear device, theoretical illicit nuclear weapon
- IND, the Index control character in the C0 and C1 control codes
- Induced representation, in mathematics, an operation for passing from a representation of a subgroup to a representation of the group itself
- Indus (constellation), a constellation in the southern sky
- Investigational New Drug, an experimental drug permitted by the U.S. FDA to be transported across the U.S. state lines
- Indulgence vs. restraint (IND), a Geert Hofstede's cultural dimension refers to the degree of freedom that societal norms give to citizens in fulfilling their human desires

== Organizations ==
- Immigration and Nationality Directorate, a former part of the Home Office, a department of the United Kingdom government
- Immigration and Naturalisation Service (Netherlands), the organization that handles the admission of foreigners in the Netherlands
- Independent News Distributors, a defunct comics and magazine distributor
- Institute of Notre Dame, a high school in Baltimore, Maryland
- Interplanetary Network Directorate, a branch of the NASA Jet Propulsion Laboratory that manages the agency's Deep Space Network
- Iota Nu Delta, the first South Asian interest college fraternity

== Locations and languages ==
- India, a country in South Asia
- Indonesia, a country in South-east Asia
  - Indonesian language, the official language of Indonesia
- Indiana, a state in the United States of America (archaic: 2-letter abbreviation "IN" is now preferred to avoid confusion with India or Indianapolis)
- Indianapolis, a city in the U.S. state Indiana (also abbreviated as "Indy")
  - Indianapolis (Amtrak station), a railway station located in the city
  - Indianapolis International Airport, the IATA abbreviation code for an airport located in the city
  - Scoreboard and/or statistics line abbreviation for sports franchises located in Indianapolis:
    - Indiana Fever, the city's Women's National Basketball Association (WNBA) team
    - Indiana Pacers, the city's National Basketball Association (NBA) team
    - Indianapolis Colts, the city's National Football League (NFL) team
    - Indianapolis Indians, the city's International League (IL) baseball team
    - Indy Eleven, the city's United Soccer League (USL) team
    - Indy Fuel, the city's ECHL hockey team

== People ==
- Bill Ind (1942–2026), English Church of England bishop

== Other ==
- Independent Albums, a Billboard chart with the shortcut "IND"
