= ISP (disambiguation) =

ISP commonly refers to an Internet service provider.

ISP, isp, or Isp may also refer to:

== Places ==
- Islip railway station (Network Rail station code ISP), England
- Long Island MacArthur Airport (IATA Airport code ISP), New York, US

=== Education ===
- Information Society Project, at Yale Law School
- Institute of Southern Punjab, a university in Pakistan
- Instituto Superior Politécnico, a university in São Tomé and Príncipe
- Institut supérieur de philosophie, the Higher Institute of Philosophy in Louvain-la-Neuve, Belgium
- Integrated science program, an honors program at Northwestern University
- International School of Panama
- International School of Paris, France
- International School of Prague, Czech Republic
- International Science Programme, a program at Uppsala University for research support in basic sciences for low-income countries
- Petnica Science Center (Istraživačka Stanica Petnica)

== Organizations and agencies ==
- Independence for Scotland Party
- Independent Socialist Party (disambiguation), in several countries
- ISP Sports, US marketing and broadcast company
- National Inspectorate of Strategic Products (Sweden) (Swedish: Inspektionen för strategiska produkter)
- Integrated Service Provider, a type of logistics services firm
- Intesa Sanpaolo, Italian bank
- Sovereign and Popular Italy (Italia Sovrana e Popolare), Italian political party

=== Law enforcement ===
- Idaho State Police
- Illinois State Police
- Indiana State Police
- Iowa State Patrol
- Iowa State Penitentiary, Fort Madison, Iowa, US

== Science and technology ==
=== Computing ===
- Image signal processor
- In-system programming, of programmable logic devices in-circuit
- Information Systems Professional, an information technology title and post-nominal
- Interface segregation principle, a principle of object-oriented design
- Internet service provider, an organization that provides services for accessing, using, or participating in the Internet
- ISP Formal Verification Tool, a verification tool for MPI (Message Passing Interface) programs

=== Other uses in science and technology ===
- Imperial smelting process, in zinc smelting
- Polarization in astronomy, interstellar polarization
- Specific impulse (I_{sp}), a measure of rocket and jet efficiency
