= IB =

IB, Ib or ib may refer to:

== Organizations ==
=== Business ===
- Iberia (airline) (IATA airline code)
- Information Builders, a software firm
- International Bank (Liberia)
- International business
- Investment banking
- Internet Brands
- Interstate Batteries
- Intrapreneurial Bricolage

=== Intelligence ===
- FBI Intelligence Branch, the United States Federal Bureau of Investigation's branch in charge of intelligence analysis
- Intelligence Bureau (India), the domestic intelligence organization of India
- Intelligence Bureau (Pakistan), the domestic intelligence organization of Pakistan
- IB, a defunct intelligence agency within the Swedish Army involved in the IB affair

=== Other ===
- The International Baccalaureate, an educational program
- Intervention Board for Agricultural Produce, a former British government department

== Science and technology ==
- Inclusion bodies, nuclear or cytoplasmic aggregates of stainable substances, usually proteins
- Ion beam, a type of charged particle beam
- I b or I-b, a subtype of Type I supernova; see Type Ib and Ic supernovae
- IB printing, a Technicolor concept

=== Computing ===
- Imageboard, a type of Internet forum that focuses on posting images
- InfiniBand, a type of computer network technology
- Infinite baffle, in loudspeaker enclosure design
- Information behavior, a subdiscipline within the field of library and information science
- Interface Builder, a user interface design application on Mac OS X that is part of Xcode
- Invision Power Board, Internet forum software written in PHP

=== Medicine and related ===
- Ibuprofen, a non-steroidal anti-inflammatory drug
- Investigator's brochure, a document summarizing pharmacological information about an investigational product
- Isobuscaline, a psychedelic drug

== Places ==
- Ib railway station, a station in the Indian Railways system
- Ib River, a river in India
- Ib Thermal Power Station, near Jharsuguda, Odisha, India
- Ibb Governorate (also spelled "Ib"), Yemen
- International border
  - India–Pakistan border or International Border
- Imperial Beach, California, United States
- Ingleby Barwick, a town in North Yorkshire, England

== Arts and entertainment ==
- Ib (video game), a 2012 video game
- The Ib Award, presented occasionally by the Danish Film Academy
- Ib, a variant of the language game Ubbi dubbi
- Ib, a fictional ancient city in H. P. Lovecraft's story "The Doom That Came to Sarnath"
- Ib, a title character of Ib and Little Christina, a Hans Christian Andersen fairy-tale

== People ==
- Ibrahim Coulibaly (1964–2011), Ivorian rebel
- Ib Holm Sørensen (1949–2012), Danish computer scientist
- Ib Larsen (born 1945), Danish rower
- Ibrahim Hussein (artist) (1936–2009), Malaysian artist
- Ingrid Burley (born 1986), American rapper

== Other uses ==
- Ib., abbreviation for Latin ibidem ("in the same place") used in references
- Ib (given name), a Danish male first name
- Ib (cuneiform), a common-use sign in the Epic of Gilgamesh and other cuneiform texts
- Ib, "heart", an Ancient Egyptian concept of the soul or spirit
- Intelligent building, a type of building
- Itinerarium Burdigalense, the oldest known Christian itinerarium
- Issue Brief, a type of Congressional Research Service Report
