= Ali R. Rabi =

Iranian-born academic

Ali R. Rabi is an Iranian-born academic. He was born in Tehran and went to the United States after graduation from High School in 1966.

== Education ==
He earned his B.S. and M.S. in Architectural Technology and Ph.D. in City and Regional Planning.

== Academic career ==
He returned to Iran in 1974 where he taught at the University of Tehran School of Architecture while practicing regional planning at the Plan and Budget Organization. He also served as the senior advisor in the Ministry of Housing and Urban Development. After the Iranian Revolution, he served at the Vice Chancellor and Dean of Education at Farabi University. From 1982 to 1984, he served as the Chief Planner of Fisheries, Ahwaz Still Mill Plant, and Regional Planning Group.

== Business activities ==
He moved back to United States and established his own business in Northern Virginia. He operated this business until 2000. In 2001, he initiated the International University of Iran as the platform for bridging Iranian specialists and academics abroad with the scientific communities in Iran.

Dr. Rabi has been working on the Virtual University project during the past 10 years in Iran, the Middle East, Europe and the United States. He is currently a visiting scholar at the University of Maryland, College Park, Center for International Development and Conflict Management. His areas of interests include: *Information Society,

- Information Technology and International Development,
- e-Learning
- Political Economy.

He is also the founder and co-chair of the Middle East Citizens Assembly.

Ali Rabi has interest in poetry, painting and politics.

== Positions held ==
- Chancellor, International University of Iran (IUI)
- Founding Chair, Middle East Citizens Assembly (MECA)
- Board Member, Iran-America Peace Forum
- Board Member, Campaign Against Sanctions and Military Intervention in Iran CASMII
- Visiting Scholar, Center for International Development and Conflict Management, University of Maryland, College Park, Maryland.
