= ICM =

ICM may refer to:

== Organizations ==
- Irish Church Missions, an Anglican mission
- Institut du Cerveau, the Paris Brain Institute, a research center
- Interdisciplinary Centre for Mathematical and Computational Modelling, University of Warsaw
- International Confederation of Midwives
- ICM Partners, a former talent and literary agency, originally International Creative Management
- ICM Research, a UK polling company, originally Independent Communications and Marketing
- ICM Registry, the company that sponsors the .xxx Internet top-level domain for adult entertainment
- Independent Citizens Movement, a United States Virgin Islands party
- Chartered Institute of Credit Management, a UK-based professional Institute, formerly the Institute of Credit Management
- Institute of Commercial Management a UK-based body for commercial and business development managers
- Intergovernmental Committee for Migration, a former name of the UN International Organization for Migration
- Islamic Center of Murfreesboro, Tennessee, US
- Missionary Sisters of the Immaculate Heart of Mary, a Roman Catholic religious institute of pontifical right of women, shortened as "I.C.M."

== Science and technology ==
- Image Color Management, Microsoft Windows software
- Iterated conditional modes, an algorithm for approximate statistical inference
- Integrated catchment management, a subset of environmental planning
- Interim Control Module, a NASA-constructed module
- Internal Coordinate Mechanics, a software program and algorithm
- Intracluster medium, in astronomy
- IBIS Interconnect Modeling Specification
- Initial consonant mutation, a type of apophony in linguistics

=== Biology and medicine ===
- Insertable cardiac monitor, a small device
- Inner cell mass, a structure in the early development of an embryo
- Iodinated contrast medium, an intravenous radiocontrast agent
- Intensive care medicine, a medical specialty
- Ischemic cardiomyopathy, a type of cardiomyopathy

== Events ==
- International Congress of Mathematicians, the largest mathematics conference, hosted by the International Mathematical Union

== Military and government ==
- Iraq Campaign Medal, of the US Armed Forces
- Improved conventional munition, an artillery
- Intelligence Commendation Medal, awarded by the US CIA

== Other uses ==
- Integrated coastal management, a coastal management process
- Idealized cognitive model, in linguistics
- Independent Chip Model, in poker
- Indian classical music
- Intentional camera movement, used in creative photography
- Interactive contract manufacturing, a business model
- Internationales Congress Center München, Munich, Germany
- NS Intercity Materieel, an electric train operated by Dutch Railways

== See also ==
- Scanning ion-conductance microscopy (SICM)
- Intercontinental ballistic missile (ICBM)
