= IGM =

IGM may refer to:

- Initiative on Global Markets, at the University of Chicago Booth School of Business
- IG Metall, German metalworkers' union
- IGM Financial, Canada
- Institut Gaspard Monge, at the University of Marne la Vallée
- International Grandmaster, a chess title
- Intergalactic medium
- Kingman Airport (Arizona) (IATA Code: IGM)
- Instituto Geográfico Militar (Chile), Chilean national mapping agency
- Istituto Geografico Militare, Italian national mapping agency
- Intersex genital mutilation

== Medicine ==
- Immunoglobulin M, an antibody
