= Inet (disambiguation) =

Inet or INET may refer to:

- INET or Institute for New Economic Thinking, post-Keynesian economics think tank
- Inet, electronic trading platform from the 1970s until its acquisition in 2002
- Abbreviated form of Internet, used in the contexts of technical documentation and system administration.
- Inet TV, South Korean television channel
- INET, company in Denji Sentai Megaranger, Japanese television serial of 1997–1998
- the INET Framework, open-source model library for an OMNeT++ simulation environment

== See also ==
- iiNet, an Australian Internet service provider
