= Iana (given name) =

Iana is a given name. Notable people with the given name include:

- Iana (goddess), in ancient Roman mythology
- Iana Bondar (born 1991), Ukrainian biathlete
- Iana Matei, Romanian activist
- Iana Salenko (born 1983), Ukrainian ballet dancer
- Iana Varnacova, contestant who represented Moldova in the Miss World 2008 beauty pageant
