= Ifo =

Ifo or IFO may refer to:

== Places ==
- Ifo, Ogun State, a local government area in Ogun State, Nigeria
- Ivano-Frankivsk International Airport in Ivano-Frankivsk, Ukraine, their IATA airport code
- Ifo Refugee Camp, UNHCR refugee camp in Kenya
- Ifo Island, Antarctica

== Objects ==
- Identified flying object, as opposed to unidentified flying object (UFO)
- Interferometer, an instrument that superimposes waves to cause interference

== Other ==
- IFO file, a file type used on DVD-Video
- Ifo Ekpre-Olomu (born 1993), American football player
- Ifo Institute for Economic Research (Ifo Institut für Wirtschaftsforschung) in Munich, Germany
- Ifo language, found in Vanuatu
- Battle of Ifo, battle in the 2012 Malian Civil War
