= IFRB =

IFRB is an acronym for:

- Institute of Food and Radiation Biology
- International Frequency Registration Board, a former organ of the International Telecommunication Union; see Telecommunications § Regulation

== See also ==
- IRFB, the International Rugby Football Board, the predecessor to World Rugby
