= IMF (disambiguation) =

IMF is the International Monetary Fund, an international financial institution.

IMF may also refer to:

== Entertainment ==
- Impossible Missions Force, a fictional secret espionage agency in the Mission: Impossible television and film series
- International Music Feed, a music video television network
- Internationale Medien und Film, a fund of Intermedia

== Organisations ==
- Indian Mountaineering Foundation, a national body organising high-altitude expeditions in the Himalayas
- International Metalworkers' Federation, a global union federation
- International Motorcycling Federation or Fédération Internationale de Motocyclisme
- International Myeloma Foundation, a non-profit serving patients with a cancer of plasma cells in the bone marrow

== Science and technology ==
- Inframammary fold, in anatomy
- Initial mass function, in stellar astronomy
- Intermolecular force, non-bonding electrostatic forces between molecules
- Interplanetary magnetic field, in space
- Intramuscular fat, in anatomy
- Intrinsic mode function, in signal analysis

=== Computing ===
- Individual Master File, the system used by the IRS to process tax transactions
- Intelligent Message Filter, a Microsoft Exchange Server technology
- Interoperable Master Format, a file-based format
- IMF (id music file or id music format), an audio file format created by id Software

== Other uses ==
- Internationale Maifestspiele Wiesbaden, International May Festival, Germany
