= Internet Radio Equality Act =

The Internet Radio Equality Act (IREA), originally introduced as H.R. 2060, is proposed legislation by Rep Jay Inslee (D) WA to nullify the May 1, 2007, determination of the Copyright Royalty Board (CRB) modifying the current webcast radio royalties and fees retroactively to January 1, 2006. The previous system charged radio stations a per performance rate of $0.000768, and it was that same rate from 1998-2005. The new system, effective May 1, 2007, increased that per-performance rate to the following levels: 2006=$0.0008, 2007=$0.0011, 2008=$0.0014, 2009=$0.0018, and 2010=$0.0019. This bill was introduced on April 26, 2007 by Rep. Jay Inslee (D-WA) and Rep. Donald Manzullo (R-IL) and has been cosponsored by over 100 members of the Congress. It was introduced in the Senate as S. 1353 on May 10 by Ron Wyden (D-OR) and Sam Brownback (R-KS). The bill's proponents claim that "the majority of webcasters will go bankrupt and silent" when the Copyright Royalty Board's decision takes effect unless the bill passes.

The legislation appears to have been abandoned in committee, as of July 19, 2008.

== Background ==
The decision of the Copyright Royalty Board was made following the guidelines of a "willing buyer / willing seller" business model, and as the result of a two-year proceeding, with dozens of witnesses and hundreds of documents from over twenty different parties, including (but not limited to) large webcasters, small webcasters, NPR, college stations, and SoundExchange. The CRB was privy to private financial records and business models of the webcasters, and after reviewing the evidence and testimony, issued their decision (currently under appeal) on May 1, 2007. It is dissatisfaction with the CRB decision that prompted the creation and sponsoring of the IREA.

Statutory license regulations dictate that digital transmissions of public performances of sound recordings need permissions from two sets of copyright owners—the owners of the musical work (usually the songwriter or the composer) and the owners of the sound recordings themselves (usually a record label, unless the artists own their own master recordings). Traditional radio stations pay a flat per-song fee, and are only responsible for paying the musical work royalty. Internet radio is an entirely different market, and is responsible for both royalties, according to the Digital Millennium Copyright Act of 1998.

The sound recording royalty, when paid under the provisions of the statutory license, is distributed to the featured artist on the recording, two musicians' unions, and the owner of the copyright—usually a record label.

While traditional radio stations cannot determine how many people are listening to their station at a given moment, this information is readily available to an Internet radio station. The Internet Radio Equality Act specifies that the provider may choose to pay royalties of:

- 0.33 cents ($0.0033) per hour of sound recordings transmitted to a single listener, or
- 7.5 percent of the revenues received by the provider during that year that are directly related to the provider's digital transmissions of sound recordings.

== Rate Comparison ==
The following comparison is calculated based upon an imaginary Internet radio station that broadcasts, on average, fifteen songs to one hundred listeners each hour. Totals given are per year.

=== Internet Radio Equality Act rates ===
$2890.80 ($.0033/hour * 24 hours/day * 365 days/year * 100 average listeners/hour)

=== Copyright Royalty Board rates ===
2006: $10512 ($.0008/song * 15 songs/hour * 24 hours/day * 365 days/year * 100 average listeners/hour)
2007: $14454 ($.0011/song * 15 songs/hour * 24 hours/day * 365 days/year * 100 average listeners/hour)
2008: $18396 ($.0014/song * 15 songs/hour * 24 hours/day * 365 days/year * 100 average listeners/hour)
2009: $23652 ($.0018/song * 15 songs/hour * 24 hours/day * 365 days/year * 100 average listeners/hour)
2010: $24966 ($.0019/song * 15 songs/hour * 24 hours/day * 365 days/year * 100 average listeners/hour)

== Alternative Rates and Terms to the Copyright Royalty Board Determination ==
SoundExchange recently came to an agreement with certain large webcasters regarding the minimum fees that were modified by the recent determination of the Copyright Royalty Board on May 1, 2007. While their decision imposed a $500 per station or channel minimum fee for all webcasters, certain webcasters represented through Digital Media Association (DiMA) negotiated a $50,000 "cap" on those fees. ( SoundExchange also recently offered alternative rates and terms to certain eligible small webcasters, that allows them to calculate their royalties as a percentage of their revenue or expenses, instead of at a per performance rate.

These developments directly attend to some of the concerns prompting the creation of the proposed IREA, namely the "uncapped" $500 minimum fee, and the ability to assess liability at a rate other than the CRB determination.

== Support and Controversy ==
Internet broadcasters have organized a coalition which is supporting this legislation; a nationwide "Internet Radio Day of Silence" took place among participating broadcasters on June 26, 2007.

Critics of the Act, such as musicFIRST and SoundExchange, believe that the IREA is unnecessary, and that it would be a large windfall to large webcasters, allowing them to pay a fraction of what they have been paying since 1998. They also believe that the bill is flawed in principle, as it makes the rate less than what it was from 1998-2005.
