= IANAL =

Usenet and chat abbreviation for the expansion "I am not a lawyer"

IANAL is a Usenet and chat abbreviation for the expansion "I am not a lawyer". The expansion may be used by non-lawyers who are seeking to avoid accusations of unauthorized practice of law and are not making any recommendation to the particular addressee of their remarks.

A related abbreviation, TINLA, stands for "This is not legal advice". One or both of these expansions often precede opinions about law. The use of these expansions serves as a warning for the reader not to take the opinion as professional legal advice. Many jurisdictions have legal restrictions on actually giving or even appearing to give legal advice, or otherwise practicing as a lawyer without legal qualifications and official registration. Rendition of legal advice by a person who is not licensed to do so can be the basis for a charge of unauthorized practice of law.

== Origin and usage ==
The term IANAL is reported to have been common on Usenet by the late 1980s and early 1990s.

The case law standard for determining what comments cross the line is generally "the application of law to facts specific to an individual seeking legal advice". Attorneys may use a disclaimer to reduce confusion, and "I am not your lawyer" is part of a typical disclaimer. There are "weighty obligations" that go along with the creation of a lawyer–client relationship, particularly if an "online exchange includes legal advice relating to the client's specific facts". Courts have held that (in the case of 900 numbers) boilerplate disclaimers without clear actions to indicate assent may not avoid the creation of a lawyer–client relationship.

Variations of IANAL can be applied to different fields, such as IANAMD for "I am not a medical doctor" or IANAP for "I am not a physicist" These expansions serve the same general purpose as IANAL – to discourage the use of the information as professional advice.

== See also ==
- I'm not a scientist, a political phrase
- Jargon File, a glossary of computer programmer slang
