= Indonesia Corruption Watch =

Indonesian non-governmental organization

- Abbreviation: ICW
- Purpose: Anti-corruption campaign
- Coordinator: Agus Sunaryanto
- Website: https://antikorupsi.org/en Indonesia Corruption Watch (Indonesia)

Indonesia Corruption Watch (ICW) is an Indonesian NGO whose primary mission is to monitor and publicise incidents of corruption in Indonesia. ICW is also heavily engaged in the prevention and deterrence of corruption through education, cultural change, prosecutions and system reform. The organization was formed in Jakarta in June 1998 to prevent corruption in post-Suharto governments.

ICW's work and influence in Indonesia as a major NGO in its field has been recognized and extensively reported on since 1998 by Indonesian and major international news media. The United Nations Office on Drugs and Crime considers ICW to be "the leading NGO" focused on fighting corruption in Indonesia. The World Bank cites multiple ICW studies in various World Bank published reports and on its website. ICW's work and reports have also been cited in hundreds of academic works, books and journals about governmental and societal corruption.

In 2013, then-Governor of Jakarta Basuki "Ahok" Tjahaja Purnama requested that ICW monitor the performance of government units under his administration. In 2015, there were arrests and reported harassment of ICW staff and activists by Indonesian police officers. On September 2, 2015, President Joko Widodo appointed former Indonesia Corruption Watch head Teten Masduki as his new chief of staff.

== Indonesian culture of corruption ==
Indonesia has a serious problem with widespread corruption, which has been described as 'rampant' and impacting people from birth until death. A 2014 study and report by Transparency International (TI) as reported in The Wall Street Journal, disclosed that 72% of young Indonesians would engage in corruption for personal gain. In 2014, Indonesia placed 107 out of 175 countries on TI's Corruption Perceptions Index. A 2003 World Bank study found that between 56 and 70% of all civil service employees were seen by their colleagues to be on the take. While some attribute the current situation to a foundation of corruption laid during the reign of Indonesian strongman President Suharto, others blame a persisting 'culture of corruption' in Indonesia and the region that predates World War II.

== History and role ==
ICW was created on 21 June 1998, a few weeks after the resignation of President Suharto, by social activist Teten Masduki, lawyer Todung Mulya Lubis, economist Faisal Basri and other persons in the midst of a reform movement aimed at ensuring that any post-Suharto government would be democratic and free of corruption.

After the fall of Suharto it soon became apparent that the subsequent introduction of a decentralized mode of government with increased regional autonomy produced more corruption, and made its detection and control more difficult. Corruption in Indonesia was no longer organized and centralized, but became fragmented as new regional power centres and leaders emerged. In this emerging situation ICW focused on bringing cases of corruption to the public and law enforcement agencies, monitoring campaign and political finance spending in national and local elections and pushing for anti-corruption laws such as the Freedom of Information Act, the Whistleblower Protection Act, Anti-Corruption Act, and Election Act.

== Organization ==
In every term, ICW rearranged its organizational structures to reflect the organization's focus issues. In early 2019, ICW focused on seven divisions, including:

- Law and Judicial Monitoring (Lalola Easter, Diky Anandya).
- Political Corruption (Egi Primayogha, Kurnia Ramadhana, Yassar Aulia, Seira Tamara).
- Public Services and Bureaucracy Reforms (Almas Ghaliya Putri Sjafrina, Dewi Anggraeni Puspitasari Naipospos).
- Public Campaign (Tibiko Zabar Pradano, Tamimah Ashilah, Fitri Yana).
- Public Engagement (Sigit Wijaya, Nisa Rizkiah, Aulia Novirta).
- Knowledge Management (Wana Alamsyah, Kes Tutoroong, Caroline Yulia, Winda Uzi).
- Finance and Administration (Supitriyani, Tasya Thin Nuzula, Imam Ichsan Adetyo, Anastasia Theola, Dede, Eko Pamuji Widodo, Nono Kasino).
- The Current Coordinator is Agus Sunaryanto.
- The Current Deputy Coordinator is Siti Juliantari Rachman.

In previous terms, ICW had other divisions such as Research, Public Investigation, Public Fundraising, Anti-Corruption Networking, or Budget Monitoring and Analysis.

== Recognition ==
On 6 August 2015, Indonesia Corruption Watch was nominated as one of four finalists for the CDN$100,000 Allard Prize for International Integrity. The other finalists include John Githongo, Sergei Magnitsky and Rafael Marques de Morais.
