= IG =

IG, Ig, or ig may refer to:

== Companies ==
- IG Farben, a former German industrial conglomerate
- IG Group, a UK financial services company
- IG Recordings, a record label formed by the Indigo Girls, an American folk/rock duo
- Production I.G, a Japanese anime company
- Impressions Games, a defunct United States gaming company
- Internet Group, stylized as "iG", a Brazilian internet service provider
- Invictus Games (company), a Hungarian video game developer
- Air Italy (2018–2020) (former IATA code: IG), a former Italian airline

== Games ==
- Imperial Guard (Warhammer 40,000), from the tabletop strategy game Warhammer 40,000
- Imperium Galactica, a 1997 PC CD-ROM game by Hungary-based Digital Reality
- Insomniac Games, an independent video game developer
- Invictus Gaming, a Chinese professional E-sports team
- Invictus Games, Paralympic sporting event
- Invictus Games (company), Hungarian video game developer

== Government ==
- Inspector General, a high-ranking official
- Inspector General of Police
- Inspector General of Prisons
- Interim Government of Ambazonia
- Irish Guards, a Foot Guards regiment of the British Army

== Places ==
- Ig, Slovenia
- IG postcode area, a group of postcode districts around Ilford, England

== Science and technology ==
- Immunoglobulin, also known as antibody, a protein used by the immune system to identify and neutralize foreign objects such as bacteria and viruses
- Imperial gallon (ig), an Imperial unit of volume defined as 4.54609 litres (1.20095 US gal)
- Insulated glazing, double or triple glass window panes separated by an air or other gas-filled space to reduce heat transfer
- Integrated graphics, the term for a graphics processor that is integrated into the mainboard

== Other uses ==
- Ig Nobel Prize, a parody of the Nobel Prize (ignoble)
- Igbo language, the official language of Nigeria, by ISO 639-1 language code
- Information governance, the management of information at an organisation
- Inscriptiones Graecae (IG), a collection of ancient Greek inscriptions
- The IG-series, a series of combat droids in the Star Wars universe
- Instagram, a social media application
- Investment-grade bond or debt
- Island Games, international sports tournament
- Italian Greyhound, a breed of dog
- Injustice Guild, the villainous counterpart to the Justice Guild of America
- Inspector Gadget, an animated media franchise
