= International Fashion Academy Pakistan =

Fashion school in Lahore, Pakistan

- پاکستان بین اقوامی فیشن آکادمی
- IFAP logo
- Type: Private
- Active: 2011–present
- Affiliations: Government
- Chairperson: Mehreen Syed
- Head: Ather Shahzad
- Location: Lahore, Punjab, Pakistan
- Campus: Ismail Aiwan-e-Science, Off shahrah e Roomi, Ferozepur Road, Lahore
- Nickname: IFAP
- Website: ifap.edu.pk

International Fashion Academy Pakistan (Urdu: پاکستان بین اقوامی فیشن آکادمی, abbreviated as IFAP) is a private fashion industry school based in Lahore, Pakistan.

== History ==
The school's chairperson is fashion model Mehreen Syed, who founded the institution in 2011. Its launching ceremony was held at Royal Palm Golf and Country Club.

== Faculty ==
Ather Shahzad is the Head of Faculty and Hassan Sheheryar Yasin is the Head of Visiting Faculty.
