= Iranian Esperanto Association =

The Iranian Esperanto Association (Esperanto: Irana Esperanto-Asocio, IREA), founded in 1996, is the national association of the World Esperanto Association (Esperanto: Universala Esperanto-Asocio) in Iran.

The core of IREA is based on the Iranian Esperantist Youth Organization (Esperanto: Irana Esperantista Junulara Organizo) and current official organ of IREA is the journal Irana Esperantisto.

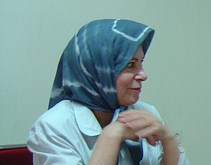
Monireh Fahmi, honorary president from April 2007 to April 2010
