= List of airports by IATA code: I =

The DST column shows the months in which Daylight Saving Time, a.k.a. Summer Time, begins and ends. A blank DST box usually indicates that the location stays on Standard Time all year, although in some cases the location stays on Summer Time all year. If a location is currently on DST, add one hour to the time in the Time column.

IATA	ICAO	Airport name	Location served	Time	DST
-IA-
IAA	UOII	Igarka Airport	Igarka, Krasnoyarsk Krai, Russia	UTC+07:00	
IAB	KIAB	McConnell Air Force Base	Wichita, Kansas, United States	UTC−06:00	Mar-Nov
IAD	KIAD	Washington Dulles International Airport	Washington, D.C.,^{1} United States	UTC−05:00	Mar-Nov
IAG	KIAG	Niagara Falls International Airport	Niagara Falls, New York, United States	UTC−05:00	Mar-Nov
IAH	KIAH	George Bush Intercontinental Airport	Houston, Texas, United States	UTC−06:00	Mar-Nov
IAM	DAUZ	In Amenas Airport (Zarzaitine Airport)	In Amenas, Algeria	UTC+01:00	
IAN	PAIK	Bob Baker Memorial Airport	Kiana, Alaska, United States	UTC−09:00	Mar-Nov
IAO	RPNS	Sayak Airport (Siargao Airport)	Del Carmen, Philippines	UTC+08:00	
IAQ	OIBH	Bahregan Airport	Bahregan, Iran	UTC+03:30	Mar-Sep
IAR	UUDL	Golden Ring Yaroslavl International Airport	Yaroslavl, Yaroslavl Oblast, Russia	UTC+03:00	
IAS	LRIA	Iași International Airport	Iași, Romania	UTC+02:00	Mar-Oct
IAU		Iaura Airport	Iaura, Papua New Guinea	UTC+10:00	
IAX	WAMS	Miangas Airport	Miangas, Indonesia	UTC+08:00	
-IB-
IBA	DNIB	Ibadan Airport	Ibadan, Nigeria	UTC+01:00	
IBB	SEII	General Villamil Airport	Isabela Island, Galápagos Islands, Ecuador	UTC−06:00	
IBE	SKIB	Perales Airport	Ibagué, Colombia	UTC−05:00	
IBI		Iboki Airport	Iboki, Papua New Guinea	UTC+10:00	
IBL		Indigo Bay Lodge Airport	Bazaruto Island, Mozambique	UTC+02:00	
IBO		Ibo Island Airport	Ibo Island, Mozambique	UTC+02:00	
IBP	SPBR	Iberia Airport	Iberia, Peru	UTC−05:00	
IBR	RJAH	Ibaraki Airport	Omitama, Honshu, Japan	UTC+09:00	
IBZ	LEIB	Ibiza Airport	Ibiza, Balearic Islands, Spain	UTC+01:00	Mar-Oct
-IC-
ICA	SVIC	Icabarú Airport	Icabarú, Venezuela	UTC−04:00	
ICC	SVIE	Andrés Miguel Salazar Marcano Airport	Coche Island, Venezuela	UTC−04:00	
ICI	NFCI	Cicia Airport	Cicia Island, Fiji	UTC+12:00	Nov-Jan
ICK	SMNI	Majoor Henk Fernandes Airport (Nieuw Nickerie Airport)	Nieuw Nickerie, Suriname	UTC−03:00	
ICL	KICL	Schenck Field	Clarinda, Iowa, United States	UTC−06:00	Mar-Nov
ICN	RKSI	Incheon International Airport	Seoul, South Korea	UTC+09:00	
ICO	RPSG	Sicogon Airport	Sicogon, Philippines	UTC+08:00	
ICS		Cascade Airport (FAA: KU70)	Cascade, Idaho, United States	UTC−07:00	Mar-Nov
ICT	KICT	Wichita Dwight D. Eisenhower National Airport	Wichita, Kansas, United States	UTC−06:00	Mar-Nov
ICY		Icy Bay Airport (FAA: 19AK)	Icy Bay, Alaska, United States	UTC−09:00	Mar-Nov
-ID-
IDA	KIDA	Idaho Falls Regional Airport	Idaho Falls, Idaho, United States	UTC−07:00	Mar-Nov
IDB	ESUE	Idre Airport	Idre, Sweden	UTC+01:00	Mar-Oct
IDC		Chilonzuine Island Airstrip	Chilonzuine Island, Mozambique	UTC+02:00	
IDF	FZCB	Idiofa Airport	Idiofa, Democratic Republic of the Congo	UTC+01:00	
IDG	KIDG	Ida Grove Municipal Airport	Ida Grove, Iowa, United States	UTC−06:00	Mar-Nov
IDH	KGIC	Idaho County Airport (FAA: GIC)	Grangeville, Idaho, United States	UTC−07:00	Mar-Nov
IDI	KIDI	Indiana County–Jimmy Stewart Airport	Indiana, Pennsylvania, United States	UTC−05:00	Mar-Nov
IDK	YIDK	Indulkana Airport	Indulkana, South Australia, Australia	UTC+09:30	Oct-Apr
IDN		Indagen Airport	Indagen, Papua New Guinea	UTC+10:00	
IDO	SWIY	Santa Isabel do Morro Airport	Santa Isabel do Morro, Tocantins, Brazil	UTC−03:00	
IDP	KIDP	Independence Municipal Airport	Independence, Kansas, United States	UTC−06:00	Mar-Nov
IDR	VAID	Devi Ahilyabai Holkar International Airport	Indore, Madhya Pradesh, India	UTC+05:30	
IDY	LFEY	Île d'Yeu Aerodrome	Île d'Yeu, Pays de la Loire, France	UTC+01:00	Mar-Oct
-IE-
IEG	EPZG	Zielona Góra Airport	Zielona Góra, Poland	UTC+01:00	Mar-Oct
IEJ	RORE	Iejima Airport	Iejima, Okinawa, Japan	UTC+09:00	
IES	EDAU	Riesa–Göhlis Airfield	Riesa, Saxony, Germany	UTC+01:00	Mar-Oct
IEV	UKKK	Kyiv International Airport (Zhuliany)	Kyiv, Ukraine	UTC+02:00	Mar-Oct
-IF-
IFA	KIFA	Iowa Falls Municipal Airport	Iowa Falls, Iowa, United States	UTC−06:00	Mar-Nov
IFF	YIFY	Iffley Airport	Iffley, Queensland, Australia	UTC+10:00	
IFH	OIFE	Hesa Air Base	Shahin Shahr, Iran	UTC+03:30	Mar-Sep
IFJ	BIIS	Ísafjörður Airport	Ísafjörður, Iceland	UTC±00:00	
IFL	YIFL	Innisfail Airport	Innisfail, Queensland, Australia	UTC+10:00	
IFN	OIFM	Isfahan International Airport (Shahid Beheshti Int'l)	Isfahan, Iran	UTC+03:30	Mar-Sep
IFO	UKLI	Ivano-Frankivsk International Airport	Ivano-Frankivsk, Ukraine	UTC+02:00	Mar-Oct
IFP	KIFP	Laughlin/Bullhead International Airport	Bullhead City, Arizona, United States	UTC−07:00	
IFU	VREI	Ifuru Airport	Ifuru, Raa Atoll, Maldives	UTC+05:00	
-IG-
IGA	MYIG	Inagua Airport (Matthew Town Airport)	Inagua Islands, Bahamas	UTC−05:00	Mar-Nov
IGB	SAVJ	Ingeniero Jacobacci Airport (Capitán FAA H. R. Borden Airport)	Ingeniero Jacobacci, Río Negro, Argentina	UTC−03:00	
IGD	LTCT	Iğdır Airport	Iğdır, Turkey	UTC+03:00	
IGE	FOOI	Tchongorove Airport	Iguela, Gabon	UTC+01:00	
IGG	PAIG	Igiugig Airport	Igiugig, Alaska, United States	UTC−09:00	Mar-Nov
IGH	YIGM	Ingham Airport	Ingham, Queensland, Australia	UTC+10:00	
IGL	LTBL	Çiğli Air Base	İzmir, Turkey	UTC+03:00	
IGM	KIGM	Kingman Airport	Kingman, Arizona, United States	UTC−07:00	
IGN	RPMI	Maria Cristina Airport (Iligan Airport)	Iligan, Philippines	UTC+08:00	
IGO	SKIG	Jaime Ortíz Betancur Airport	Chigorodó, Colombia	UTC−05:00	
IGR	SARI	Cataratas del Iguazú International Airport	Puerto Iguazú, Misiones, Argentina	UTC−03:00	
IGS	ETSI	Ingolstadt Manching Airport	Ingolstadt, Bavaria, Germany	UTC+01:00	Mar-Oct
IGT	URMS	Magas Airport (Sleptsovskaya Airport)	Nazran, Ingushetia, Russia	UTC+03:00	
IGU	SBFI	Foz do Iguaçu International Airport	Foz do Iguaçu, Paraná, Brazil	UTC−03:00	
-IH-
IHC	FQIA	Inhaca Airport	Inhaca Island, Mozambique	UTC+02:00	
IHN	OYQN	Qishn Airport	Qishn, Yemen	UTC+03:00	
IHO	FMSI	Ihosy Airport	Ihosy, Madagascar	UTC+03:00	
IHR	OIZI	Iranshahr Airport	Iranshahr, Iran	UTC+03:30	Mar-Sep
IHU		Ihu Airport	Ihu, Papua New Guinea	UTC+10:00	
-II-
IIA	EIMN	Inishmaan Aerodrome	Inishmaan, Ireland	UTC±00:00	Mar-Oct
IIL	OICI	Ilam Airport	Ilam, Iran	UTC+03:30	Mar-Sep
IIS	AYIA	Nissan Island Airport	Nissan Island, Papua New Guinea	UTC+11:00	
-IJ-
IJK	USII	Izhevsk Airport	Izhevsk, Udmurtia, Russia	UTC+04:00	
IJU	SSIJ	João Batista Bos Filho Airport	Ijuí, Rio Grande do Sul, Brazil	UTC−03:00	
IJX	KIJX	Jacksonville Municipal Airport	Jacksonville, Illinois, United States	UTC−06:00	Mar-Nov
-IK-
IKA	OIIE	Tehran Imam Khomeini International Airport	Tehran, Iran	UTC+03:30	Mar-Sep
IKB	KUKF	Wilkes County Airport (FAA: UKF)	North Wilkesboro, North Carolina, United States	UTC−05:00	Mar-Nov
IKI	RJDB	Iki Airport	Iki, Iki Island, Japan	UTC+09:00	
IKK	KIKK	Greater Kankakee Airport	Kankakee, Illinois, United States	UTC−06:00	Mar-Nov
IKL	FZGV	Ikela Airport	Ikela, Democratic Republic of the Congo	UTC+01:00	
IKO	PAKO	Nikolski Air Station	Nikolski, Alaska, United States	UTC−09:00	Mar-Nov
IKP	YIKM	Inkerman Airport	Inkerman, Queensland, Australia	UTC+10:00	
IKS	UEST	Tiksi Airport	Tiksi, Yakutia, Russia	UTC+09:00	
IKT	UIII	International Airport Irkutsk	Irkutsk, Irkutsk Oblast, Russia	UTC+08:00	
IKU	UCFL	Issyk-Kul International Airport	Tamchy, Issyk-Kul Region, Kyrgyzstan		
-IL-
ILA	WABL	Illaga Airport	Illaga, Indonesia	UTC+09:00	
ILD	LEDA	Lleida–Alguaire Airport	Lleida, Catalonia, Spain	UTC+01:00	Mar-Oct
ILE	KILE	Skylark Field	Killeen, Texas, United States	UTC−06:00	Mar-Nov
ILF	CZBD	Ilford Airport	Ilford, Manitoba, Canada	UTC−06:00	Mar-Nov
ILG	KILG	Wilmington Airport (New Castle Airport)	Wilmington, Delaware, United States	UTC−05:00	Mar-Nov
ILH	ETIK	Storck Barracks	Illesheim, Bavaria, Germany	UTC+01:00	Mar-Oct
ILI	PAIL	Iliamna Airport	Iliamna, Alaska, United States	UTC−09:00	Mar-Nov
ILK	FMMQ	Ilaka-Est Airport (Atsinanana Airport)	Ilaka, Madagascar	UTC+03:00	
ILL	KBDH	Willmar Municipal Airport (John L. Rice Field)	Willmar, Minnesota, United States	UTC−06:00	Mar-Nov
ILM	KILM	Wilmington International Airport	Wilmington, North Carolina, United States	UTC−05:00	Mar-Nov
ILN	KILN	Wilmington Air Park	Wilmington, Ohio, United States	UTC−05:00	Mar-Nov
ILO	RPVI	Iloilo International Airport	Iloilo, Philippines	UTC+08:00	
ILP	NWWE	Île des Pins Airport	Île des Pins, New Caledonia	UTC+11:00	
ILQ	SPLO	Ilo Airport	Ilo, Peru	UTC−05:00	
ILR	DNIL	Ilorin International Airport	Ilorin, Nigeria	UTC+01:00	
ILS	MSSS	Ilopango International Airport	San Salvador, El Salvador		
ILU	HKKL	Kilaguni Airport	Kilaguni, Kenya	UTC+03:00	
ILX		Ileg Airport	Ileg, Papua New Guinea	UTC+10:00	
ILY	EGPI	Islay Airport (Glenegedale Airport)	Islay, Scotland, United Kingdom	UTC±00:00	Mar-Oct
ILZ	LZZI	Žilina Airport	Žilina, Slovakia	UTC+01:00	Mar-Oct
-IM-
IMA		Iamalele Airport	Iamalele, Papua New Guinea	UTC+10:00	
IMB	SYIB	Imbaimadai Airport	Imbaimadai, Guyana	UTC−04:00	
IMD		Imonda Airport	Imonda, Papua New Guinea	UTC+10:00	
IMF	VEIM	Imphal International Airport (Tulihal Airport)	Imphal, Manipur, India	UTC+05:30	
IMG		Inhaminga Airport	Inhaminga, Mozambique	UTC+02:00	
IMI		Ine Airport (FAA: N20)	Ine, Arno Atoll, Marshall Islands	UTC+12:00	
IMK	VNST	Simikot Airport	Simikot, Nepal	UTC+05:45	
IML	KIML	Imperial Municipal Airport	Imperial, Nebraska, United States	UTC−07:00	Mar-Nov
IMM	KIMM	Immokalee Regional Airport	Immokalee, Florida, United States	UTC−05:00	Mar-Nov
IMN	AYII	Imane Airport	Imane, Papua New Guinea	UTC+10:00	
IMO	FEFZ	Zemio Airport	Zemio, Central African Republic	UTC+01:00	
IMP	SBIZ	Imperatriz Airport (Prefeito Renato Moreira Airport)	Imperatriz, Maranhão, Brazil	UTC−03:00	
IMQ	OITU	Maku International Airport	Maku, West Azerbaijan Province, Iran	UTC−03:30	
IMT	KIMT	Ford Airport	Iron Mountain / Kingsford, Michigan, United States	UTC−06:00	Mar-Nov
-IN-
INA	UUYI	Inta Airport	Inta, Komi Republic, Russia	UTC+03:00	
INB		Independence Airport	Independence, Belize	UTC−06:00	
INC	ZLIC	Yinchuan Hedong International Airport	Yinchuan, Ningxia, China	UTC+08:00	
IND	KIND	Indianapolis International Airport	Indianapolis, Indiana, United States	UTC−05:00	Mar-Nov
INE		Chinde Airport	Chinde, Mozambique	UTC+02:00	
INF	DATG	In Guezzam Airport	In Guezzam, Algeria	UTC+01:00	
INH	FQIN	Inhambane Airport	Inhambane, Mozambique	UTC+02:00	
INI	LYNI	Niš Constantine the Great Airport	Niš, Serbia	UTC+01:00	Mar-Oct
INJ	YINJ	Injune Airport	Injune, Queensland, Australia	UTC+10:00	
INK	KINK	Winkler County Airport	Wink, Texas, United States	UTC−06:00	Mar-Nov
INL	KINL	Falls International Airport	International Falls, Minnesota, United States	UTC−06:00	Mar-Nov
INM	YINN	Innamincka Airport	Innamincka, South Australia, Australia	UTC+09:30	Oct-Apr
INN	LOWI	Innsbruck Airport (Kranebitten Airport)	Innsbruck, Austria	UTC+01:00	Mar-Oct
INO	FZBA	Inongo Airport	Inongo, Democratic Republic of the Congo	UTC+01:00	
INQ	EIIR	Inisheer Aerodrome	Inisheer, Ireland	UTC±00:00	Mar-Oct
INS	KINS	Creech Air Force Base	Indian Springs, Nevada, United States	UTC−08:00	Mar-Nov
INT	KINT	Smith Reynolds Airport	Winston-Salem, North Carolina, United States	UTC−05:00	Mar-Nov
INU	ANYN	Nauru International Airport	Yaren, Nauru	UTC+12:00	
INV	EGPE	Inverness Airport	Inverness, Scotland, United Kingdom	UTC±00:00	Mar-Oct
INW	KINW	Winslow–Lindbergh Regional Airport	Winslow, Arizona, United States	UTC−07:00	
INX	WASI	Inanwatan Airport	Inanwatan, Indonesia	UTC+09:00	
INY		Inyati Airport	Inyati, South Africa	UTC+02:00	
INZ	DAUI	In Salah Airport	In Salah, Algeria	UTC+01:00	
-IO-
IOA	LGIO	Ioannina National Airport	Ioannina, Greece	UTC+02:00	Mar-Oct
IOK		Iokea Airport	Iokea, Papua New Guinea	UTC+10:00	
IOM	EGNS	Isle of Man Airport (Ronaldsway Airport)	Ronaldsway, Isle of Man	UTC±00:00	Mar-Oct
ION	FCOI	Impfondo Airport	Impfondo, Republic of the Congo	UTC+01:00	
IOP		Ioma Airport	Ioma, Papua New Guinea	UTC+10:00	
IOR	EIIM	Inishmore Aerodrome (Kilronan Airport)	Inishmore, Ireland	UTC±00:00	Mar-Oct
IOS	SBIL	Ilhéus Jorge Amado Airport	Ilhéus, Bahia, Brazil	UTC−03:00	
IOT	BGLL	Illorsuit Heliport	Avannaata, Greenland		
IOW	KIOW	Iowa City Municipal Airport	Iowa City, Iowa, United States	UTC−06:00	Mar-Nov
-IP-
IPA	NVVI	Ipota Airport	Erromango, Tafea, Vanuatu	UTC+11:00	
IPC	SCIP	Mataveri International Airport (Isla de Pascua Airport)	Easter Island, Chile	UTC−06:00	Aug-May
IPE	RPMV	Ipil Airport	Ipil, Philippines	UTC+08:00	
IPG	SWII	Ipiranga Airport	Santo Antônio do Içá, Amazonas, Brazil	UTC−04:00	
IPH	WMKI	Sultan Azlan Shah Airport	Ipoh, Perak, Malaysia	UTC+08:00	
IPI	SKIP	San Luis Airport	Ipiales, Colombia	UTC−05:00	
IPL	KIPL	Imperial County Airport (Boley Field)	Imperial / El Centro, California, United States	UTC−08:00	Mar-Nov
IPN	SBIP	Usiminas Airport	Ipatinga, Minas Gerais, Brazil	UTC−03:00	
IPT	KIPT	Williamsport Regional Airport	Williamsport, Pennsylvania, United States	UTC−05:00	Mar-Nov
IPU	SNIU	Ipiaú Airport	Ipiaú, Bahia, Brazil	UTC−03:00	
IPZ	MRSI	San Isidro de El General Airport	San Isidro de El General, Pérez Zeledón, Costa Rica		
-IQ-
IQA	ORAA	Al Asad Airbase	Anbar Province, Iraq	UTC+03:00	
IQM	ZWCM	Qiemo Airport	Qiemo, Xinjiang, China	UTC+06:00	
IQN	ZLQY	Qingyang Airport	Qingyang, Gansu, China	UTC+08:00	
IQQ	SCDA	Diego Aracena International Airport	Iquique, Chile	UTC−04:00	Aug-May
IQR	RPVZ	Siquijor Airport	Siquijor, Siquijor, Philippines	UTC+08:00	
IQT	SPQT	Coronel FAP Francisco Secada Vignetta International Airport	Iquitos, Peru	UTC−05:00	
-IR-
IRA	AGGK	Kirakira Airport (Ngorangora Airstrip)	Kirakira, Makira Island, Solomon Islands	UTC+11:00	
IRB		Iraan Municipal Airport (FAA: 2F0)	Iraan, Texas, United States	UTC−06:00	Mar-Nov
IRC	PACR	Circle City Airport (FAA: CRC)	Circle, Alaska, United States	UTC−09:00	Mar-Nov
IRD	VGIS	Ishwardi Airport	Ishwardi, Bangladesh	UTC+06:00	
IRE	SNIC	Irecê Airport	Irecê, Bahia, Brazil	UTC−03:00	
IRG	YLHR	Lockhart River Airport	Lockhart River, Queensland, Australia	UTC+10:00	
IRI	HTIR	Iringa Airport (Nduli Airport)	Iringa, Tanzania	UTC+03:00	
IRJ	SANL	Capitán Vicente Almandos Almonacid Airport	La Rioja, Argentina	UTC−03:00	
IRK	KIRK	Kirksville Regional Airport	Kirksville, Missouri, United States	UTC−06:00	Mar-Nov
IRM	USHI	Igrim Airport	Igrim, Khanty-Mansi Autonomous Okrug, Russia	UTC+05:00	
IRN	MHIR	Iriona Airport	Iriona, Honduras	UTC−06:00	
IRO	FEFI	Birao Airport	Birao, Central African Republic	UTC+01:00	
IRP	FZJH	Matari Airport	Isiro, Democratic Republic of the Congo	UTC+02:00	
IRS	KIRS	Kirsch Municipal Airport	Sturgis, Michigan, United States	UTC−05:00	Mar-Nov
IRU		Iranamadu Waterdrome	Kilinochchi, Sri Lanka	UTC+05:30	
IRZ	SWTP	Tapuruquara Airport	Santa Isabel do Rio Negro, Amazonas, Brazil	UTC−04:00	
-IS-
ISA	YBMA	Mount Isa Airport	Mount Isa, Queensland, Australia	UTC+10:00	
ISB	OPIS	Islamabad International Airport	Islamabad / Rawalpindi, Pakistan	UTC+05:00	
ISC	EGHE	St Mary's Airport	St Mary's, Isles of Scilly, United Kingdom	UTC±00:00	Mar-Oct
ISD		Iscuande Airport	Iscuande, Colombia	UTC−05:00	
ISE	LTFC	Isparta Süleyman Demirel Airport	Isparta, Turkey	UTC+03:00	
ISG	ROIG	New Ishigaki Airport	Ishigaki, Yaeyama Islands, Japan	UTC+09:00	
ISI	YISF	Isisford Airport	Isisford, Queensland, Australia	UTC+10:00	
ISJ	MMIM	Isla Mujeres Airport	Isla Mujeres, Quintana Roo, Mexico	UTC−05:00	
ISK	VAOZ	Ozar Airport	Nashik, Maharashtra, India	UTC+05:30	
ISL	LTBA	Istanbul Atatürk Airport	Istanbul, Turkey	UTC+03:00	
ISM	KISM	Kissimmee Gateway Airport	Orlando, Florida, United States	UTC−05:00	Mar-Nov
ISN	KISN	Sloulin Field International Airport	Williston, North Dakota, United States	UTC−06:00	Mar-Nov
ISO	KISO	Kinston Regional Jetport (Stallings Field)	Kinston, North Carolina, United States	UTC−05:00	Mar-Nov
ISP	KISP	Long Island MacArthur Airport	Islip, New York, United States	UTC−05:00	Mar-Nov
ISQ	KISQ	Schoolcraft County Airport	Manistique, Michigan, United States	UTC−05:00	Mar-Nov
ISS	KIWI	Wiscasset Airport (FAA: IWI)	Wiscasset, Maine, United States	UTC−05:00	Mar-Nov
IST	LTFM	Istanbul Airport	Istanbul, Turkey	UTC+03:00	
ISU	ORSU	Sulaimaniyah International Airport	Sulaymaniyah, Iraq	UTC+03:00	
ISW	KISW	South Wood County Airport (Alexander Field)	Wisconsin Rapids, Wisconsin, United States	UTC−06:00	Mar-Nov
-IT-
ITA	SBIC	Itacoatiara Airport	Itacoatiara, Amazonas, Brazil	UTC−04:00	
ITB	SBIH	Itaituba Airport	Itaituba, Pará, Brazil	UTC−03:00	
ITE	SNZW	Ituberá Airport	Ituberá, Bahia, Brazil	UTC−03:00	
ITH	KITH	Ithaca Tompkins Regional Airport	Ithaca, New York, United States	UTC−05:00	Mar-Nov
ITI		Itambacuri Airport	Itambacuri, Minas Gerais, Brazil	UTC−03:00	
ITK		Itokama Airport	Itokama, Papua New Guinea	UTC+10:00	
ITM	RJOO	Osaka International Airport (Itami Int'l)	Osaka, Honshu, Japan	UTC+09:00	
ITN	SNHA	Itabuna Airport	Itabuna, Bahia, Brazil	UTC−03:00	
ITO	PHTO	Hilo International Airport	Hilo, Hawaii, United States	UTC−10:00	
ITP	SDUN	Itaperuna Airport	Itaperuna, Rio de Janeiro, Brazil	UTC−03:00	
ITQ	SSIQ	Itaqui Airport	Itaqui, Rio Grande do Sul, Brazil	UTC−03:00	
ITR	SBIT	Itumbiara Airport	Itumbiara, Goiás, Brazil	UTC−03:00	
ITU	UHSI	Iturup Airport	Kurilsk, Sakhalin Oblast, Russia	UTC+11:00	
-IU-
IUE	NIUE	Niue International Airport (Hanan Int'l)	Alofi, Niue	UTC−11:00	
IUL		Ilu Airport	Ilu, Indonesia	UTC+09:00	
IUS		Inus Airport	Inus, Papua New Guinea	UTC+11:00	
-IV-
IVA	FMNJ	Ambanja Airport	Ambanja, Madagascar	UTC+03:00	
IVC	NZNV	Invercargill Airport	Invercargill, New Zealand	UTC+12:00	Sep-Apr
IVD	WALK	Nusantara International Airport	Nusantara, Indonesia	UTC+08:00	
IVG	LYBR	Dolac Airport	Berane, Montenegro	UTC+01:00	Mar-Oct
IVI		Viveros Island Airport	Viveros Island, Panama	UTC−05:00	
IVL	EFIV	Ivalo Airport	Ivalo, Finland	UTC+02:00	Mar-Oct
IVO		Chibolo Airport	Chibolo, Colombia	UTC−05:00	
IVR	YIVL	Inverell Airport	Inverell, New South Wales, Australia	UTC+10:00	Oct-Apr
IVW	YINW	Inverway Airport	Inverway, Northern Territory, Australia	UTC+09:30	
-IW-
IWA	UUBI	Ivanovo Yuzhny Airport	Ivanovo, Ivanovo Oblast, Russia	UTC+03:00	
IWD	KIWD	Gogebic–Iron County Airport	Ironwood, Michigan, United States	UTC−06:00	Mar-Nov
IWJ	RJOW	Iwami Airport (Hagi-Iwami Airport)	Masuda, Honshu, Japan	UTC+09:00	
IWK	RJOI	Marine Corps Air Station Iwakuni	Iwakuni, Honshu, Japan	UTC+09:00	
IWO	RJAW	Iwo Jima Air Base	Iwo Jima, Bonin Islands, Japan	UTC+09:00	
IWS	KIWS	West Houston Airport	Houston, Texas, United States	UTC−06:00	Mar-Nov
-IX-
IXA	VEAT	Agartala Airport (Singerbhil Airport)	Agartala, Tripura, India	UTC+05:30	
IXB	VEBD	Bagdogra Airport	Siliguri, West Bengal, India	UTC+05:30	
IXC	VICG	Chandigarh Airport	Chandigarh, India	UTC+05:30	
IXD	VIAL	Allahabad Airport (Bamrauli Air Force Base)	Allahabad (Prayagraj), Uttar Pradesh, India	UTC+05:30	
IXE	VOML	Mangalore Airport	Mangaluru, Karnataka, India	UTC+05:30	
IXG	VABM	Belgaum Airport	Belgaum, Karnataka, India	UTC+05:30	
IXH	VEKR	Kailashahar Airport	Kailashahar, Tripura, India	UTC+05:30	
IXI	VELR	Lilabari Airport	North Lakhimpur, Assam, India	UTC+05:30	
IXJ	VIJU	Jammu Airport (Satwari Airport)	Jammu, Jammu and Kashmir, India	UTC+05:30	
IXK	VAKS	Keshod Airport	Keshod, Gujarat, India	UTC+05:30	
IXL	VILH	Kushok Bakula Rimpochee Airport	Leh, Ladakh, India	UTC+05:30	
IXM	VOMD	Madurai Airport	Madurai, Tamil Nadu, India	UTC+05:30	
IXN	VEKW	Khowai Airport	Khowai, Tripura, India	UTC+05:30	
IXP	VIPK	Pathankot Airport	Pathankot, Punjab, India	UTC+05:30	
IXQ	VEKM	Kamalpur Airport	Kamalpur, Tripura, India	UTC+05:30	
IXR	VERC	Birsa Munda Airport	Ranchi, Jharkhand, India	UTC+05:30	
IXS	VEKU	Silchar Airport (Kumbhirgram Air Force Base)	Silchar, Assam, India	UTC+05:30	
IXT	VEPG	Pasighat Airport	Pasighat, Arunachal Pradesh, India	UTC+05:30	
IXU	VAAU	Aurangabad Airport (Chikkalthana Airport)	Aurangabad, Maharashtra, India	UTC+05:30	
IXV	VEAN	Along Airport	Along (Aalo), Arunachal Pradesh, India	UTC+05:30	
IXW	VEJS	Sonari Airport	Jamshedpur, Jharkhand, India	UTC+05:30	
IXX	VOBR	Bidar Airport	Bidar, Karnataka, India	UTC+05:30	
IXY	VAKE	Kandla Airport (Gandhidham Airport)	Kandla / Gandhidham, Gujarat, India	UTC+05:30	
IXZ	VOPB	Veer Savarkar International Airport (Port Blair Airport)	Port Blair, Andaman and Nicobar Islands, India	UTC+05:30	
-IY-
IYK	KIYK	Inyokern Airport	Inyokern, California, United States	UTC−08:00	Mar-Nov
-IZ-
IZA	SBZM	Presidente Itamar Franco Airport (Zona da Mata Regional Airport)	Juiz de Fora, Minas Gerais, Brazil	UTC−03:00	
IZM		metropolitan area^{2}	İzmir, Turkey	UTC+03:00	
IZO	RJOC	Izumo Airport	Izumo, Honshu, Japan	UTC+09:00	
IZT	MMIT	Ixtepec Airport	Ixtepec, Oaxaca, Mexico	UTC−06:00	Apr-Oct

== Notes ==
- ^1 The airport serves Washington, D.C., but it is located in the U.S. state of Virginia.
- ^2 IZM is common IATA code for Adnan Menderes Airport (IATA: ADB) and Çiğli Air Base (IATA: IGL).
