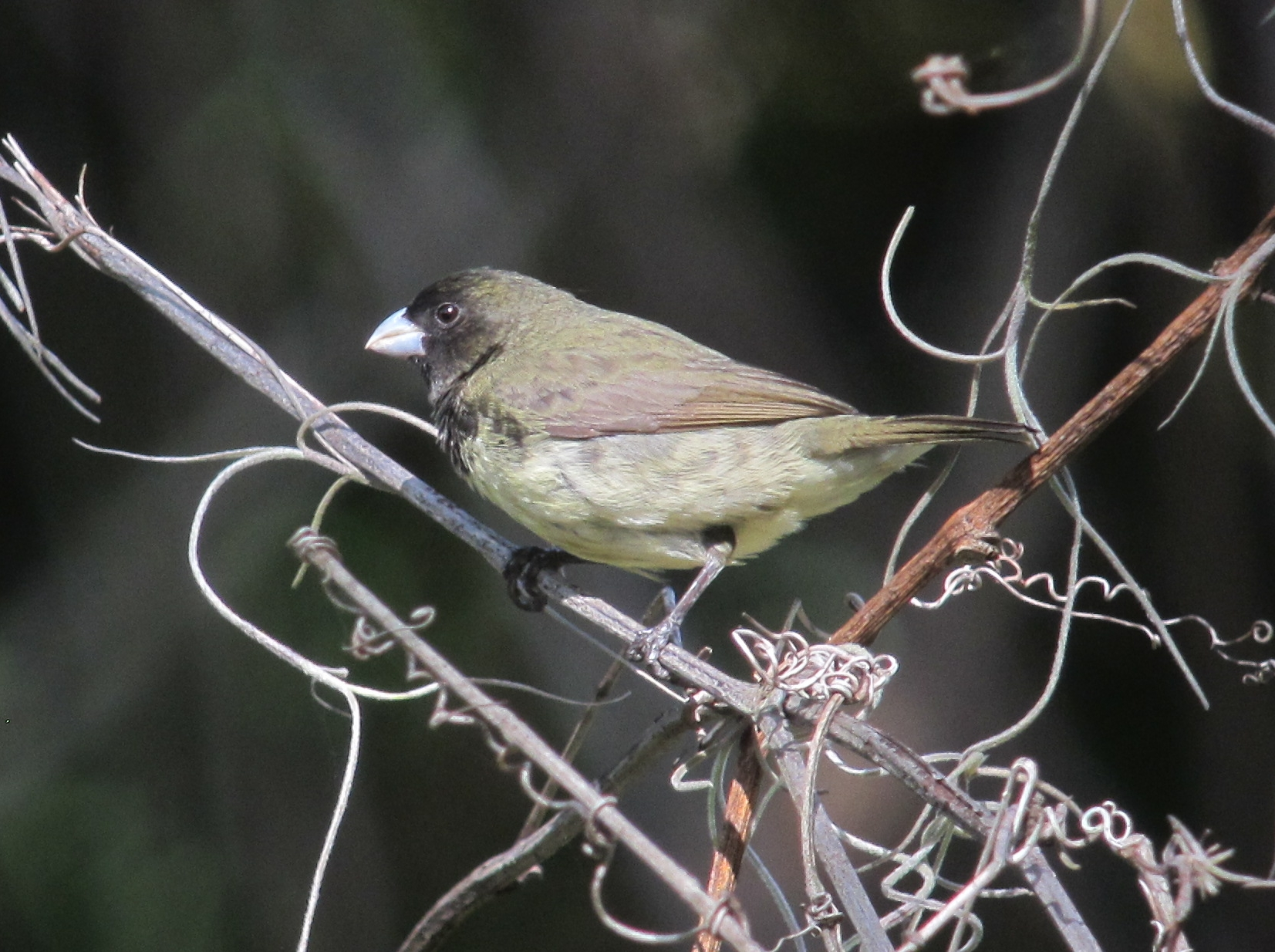
- Male, Santander, Colombia
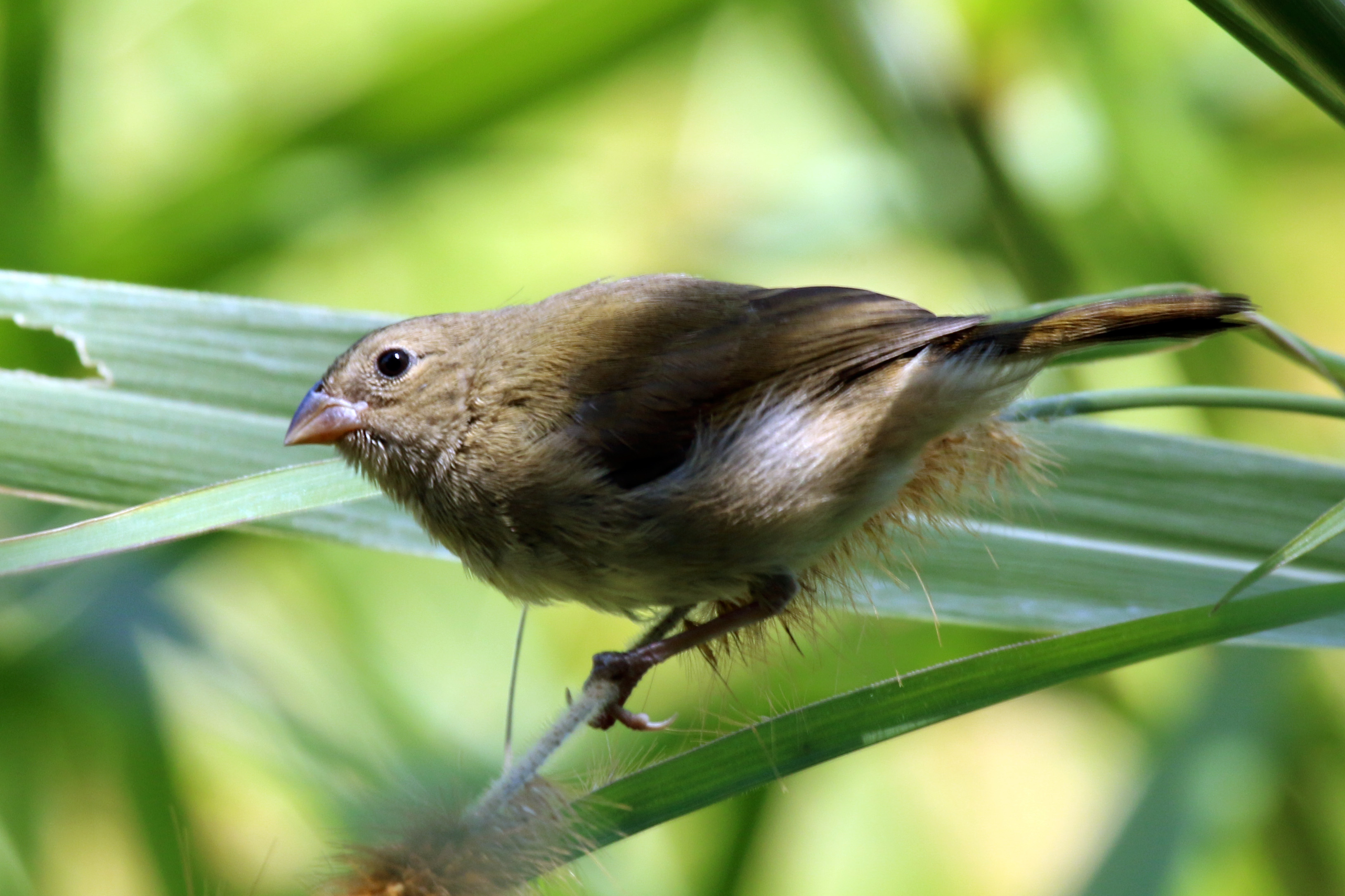
- Female, Jamaica

Conservation status
- Least Concern (IUCN 3.1)

Scientific classification
- Kingdom: Animalia
- Phylum: Chordata
- Class: Aves
- Order: Passeriformes
- Family: Thraupidae
- Genus: Melanospiza
- Species: M. bicolor

Binomial name
- Melanospiza bicolor (Linnaeus, 1766)

Synonyms
- See text

= Black-faced grassquit =

Species of bird

The black-faced grassquit (Melanospiza bicolor) is a small bird in the family Thraupidae, the tanagers and allies. It is found in the West Indies except Cuba Colombia, Venezuela and islands off its coast, and on islands in the western Caribbean Sea.

== Taxonomy and systematics ==
The first formal description of the black-faced grassquit was by the Swedish naturalist Carl Linnaeus in 1766 in the twelfth edition of his Systema Naturae. He introduced the binomial name Fringilla bicolor. Linnaeus based his description on the "Bahama Sparrow" that was described and illustrated by Mark Catesby in his The Natural History of Carolina, Florida and the Bahama Islands which was published between 1729 and 1732. By 1970 it had been reassigned to the genus Tiaris. A molecular phylogenetic study published in 2014 found that this genus was polyphyletic and that the black-faced grassquit was closely related to the Saint Lucia black finch in the (then) monospecific genus Melanospiza. In the resulting reorganization of the genera, between 2016 and 2020 taxonomic systems moved the black-faced grassquit to Melanospiza.

The black-faced grassquit has these eight subspecies:

- M. b. bicolor (Linnaeus, 1766)
- M. b. marchii (Baird, SF, 1864)
- M. b. omissa (Jardine, 1847)
- M. b. huilae (Miller, AH, 1952)
- M. b. grandior (Cory, 1887)
- M. b. johnstonei (Lowe, 1906)
- M. b. sharpei (Hartert, EJO, 1893)
- M. b. tortugensis (Cory, 1909)

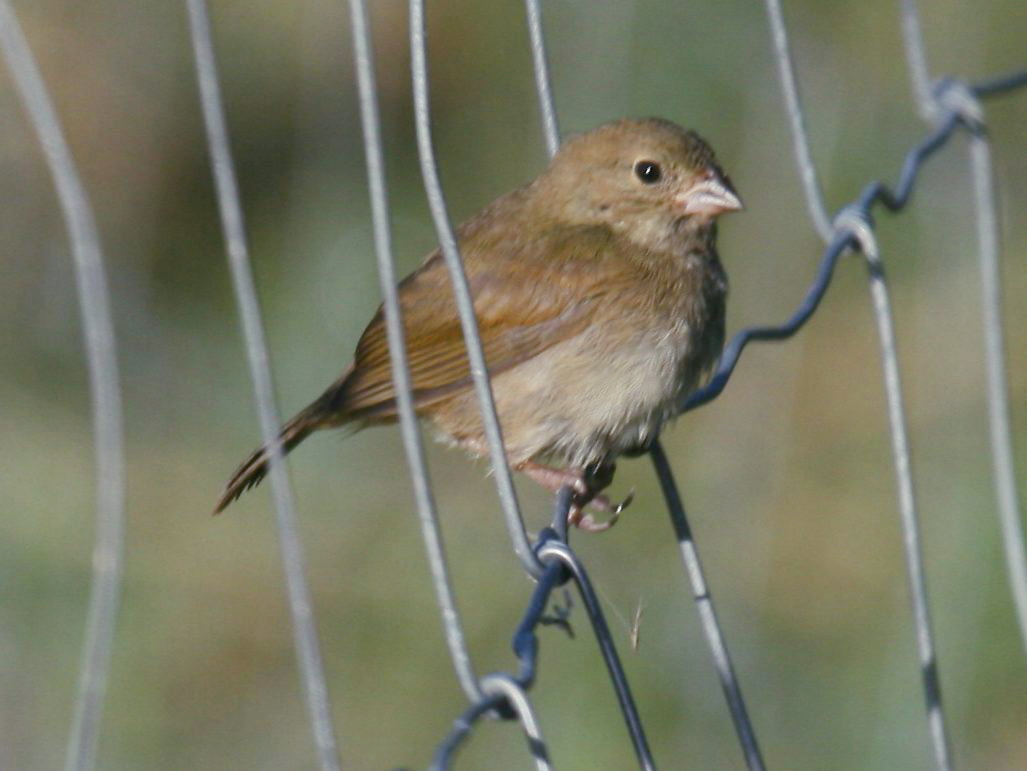
Adult female, Puerto Rico

== Description ==
The black-faced grassquit is 10.2 to 11.5 cm (4.0 to 4.5 in) long and weighs 7 to 13 g (0.25 to 0.46 oz). The species is sexually dimorphic. Adult males of the nominate subspecies have a black head and greenish upperparts, wings, and tail. Their throat and most of their underparts are black with dark greenish rear flanks. Adult females are mostly a drab olive-green that is somewhat browner or grayer on the underparts. Juveniles are like adult females.

Males of the other subspecies of the black-faced grassquit differ from the nominate and each other thus:

- M. b. marchii: smaller than nominate; underparts become white on the belly and vent
- M. b. omissa: smaller than nominate
- M. b. huilae: paler brownish olive upperparts and pale grayish flanks
- M. b. grandior: brighter olive-green upperparts
- M. b. johnstonei: brighter olive-green upperparts and entirely black underparts
- M. b. sharpei: similar to johnstonei but paler
- M. b. tortugensis: paler than sharpei with grayish olive upperparts

Both sexes of all subspecies have a dark iris and dusky pinkish legs. Males have a black bill and dusky pinkish legs. Females have a dark maxilla and a paler mandible.

== Distribution and habitat ==
The subspecies of the black-faced grassquit are found thus:

- M. b. bicolor: Bahamas and several small islands north of mainland Cuba (and see below)
- M. b. marchii: Jamaica, Hispaniola and satellites
- M. b. omissa: Puerto Rico; Lesser Antilles south to Grenada; Tobago; western Santander Department in northern Colombia; from northern Colombia's Guajira Peninsula east across northern Venezuela to western Sucre state and south to southern Lara state; and Venezuela's Margarita, Coche, and Cubagua islands (and see below)
- M. b. huilae: central Colombia's Magdalena River valley
- M. b. grandior: Providencia, Santa Catalina and San Andrés islands in the San Andrés Archipelago
- M. b. johnstonei: La Blanquilla and Los Hermanos islands off Venezuela
- M. b. sharpei: Aruba, Bonaire, and Curaçao
- M. b. tortugensis: La Tortuga Island

There are a few records of the black-faced grassquit in southern Florida that are assumed to be vagrants of M. b. bicolor. The species is also found at the northern end of Colombia's Central Andes; the population there is believed to be M. b. omissa.

The black-faced grassquit primarily inhabits open arid to dry landscapes including thorn scrub, cactus scrub, grassy areas adjoining woodlands and roads, clearings in forest, plantations, and gardens. In the Netherlands Antilles it also occurs in mangroves. Its overall upper elevational limit is 1,300 m (4,300 ft). It reaches 1,200 m (3,900 ft) in Colombia and 850 m (2,800 ft) in Venezuela.

== Behavior ==
=== Movement ===
The black-faced grassquit is generally a year-round resident though some vagrancy has been noted.

=== Feeding ===
The black-faced grassquit feeds primarily on seeds and at least in the Netherlands Antilles also includes cactus fruit in its diet. It forages singly, in pairs, and in small groups, and on and near the ground.

=== Breeding ===
The black-faced grassquit breeds year-round in the West Indies and between June and January in Tobago. It nests in loose colonies. Males sometimes perform an aerial courtship flight during which they sing, vibrate their wings, and drift down. The species' nest is a globe made mostly of grasses with a side or bottom entrance. Nests have been found on the ground among Opuntia cacti and in shrubs up to about 2.5 m (8 ft) above the ground. The clutch is two to four eggs that are dull white with light reddish brown markings. Nothing else is known about the species' breeding biology.

=== Vocalization ===
The black-faced grassquit's vocalizations have been described as an "[e]mphatic buzz often followed by [a] second louder effort" and a "soft musical tsip". A more detailed description of its song is "a buzzy tse-tsee-tsee-tsizzle-tsizzle-tsizzle or [a] shorter, thin tsit'l, tzil'ti, ti'teet", both with variations.

== Status ==
The IUCN has assessed the black-faced grassquit as being of Least Concern. It has a very large range; its population size is not known but is believed to be increasing. No immediate threats have been identified. It is considered "generally common" in the West Indies except on the small islands north of Cuba where it is "rare and very local"; it is "uncommon and local" in Colombia and "fairly common" in Venezuela.
