= Ino =

Ino or INO may refer to:

== Arts and music ==
- I-No, a character in the Guilty Gear series of video games
- Ino (mythology), a queen of Thebes in Greek mythology
- INO Records, an American Christian music label
- Ino Yamanaka, a character in the anime/manga series Naruto
- INO, Greek artist

== Medicine ==
- Internuclear ophthalmoplegia, a neurological pathological condition

== Places ==
- Fort Ino, a former Russian coastal fortress in the Gulf of Finland
- Ino, Kōchi, a town in Kochi Prefecture, Japan
- Inó, the Hungarian name for Inău village, Someș-Odorhei Commune, Sălaj County, Romania
- Ino, Alabama, an unincorporated community, United States
- Ino, Wisconsin, an unincorporated community, United States
- Inongo Airport (IATA code) in Inongo, Democratic Republic of the Congo

== Science and technology ==
- 173 Ino, an asteroid in the main Asteroid Belt
- India-based Neutrino Observatory, a particle physics research project
- Institut National d'Optique, a Canadian optical corporation
- Nitrosyl iodide, molecular formula INO
- Arduino microcontroller file extension

== Other ==
- INO, ИНО, Иностранный отдел, First Chief Directorate of the USSR's KGB
- USS Ino, 1851 clipper ship
- Shiori Ino, a Japanese murder victim
- iNo Mobile, a mobile phone company in Singapore
