= I Didn't Know (disambiguation) =

"I Didn't Know" is a song by Serhat from the Eurovision Song Contest 2016.

I Didn't Know may also refer to:

- "I Didn't Know", a song by Ph.D. from the album Is It Safe?, 1983
- "I Didn't Know", a song by Phish from the album Live Phish Volume 20, 2003
- "I Didn't Know", a 2010 song by Alex Lambert

== See also ==
- I Don't Know (disambiguation)
