= Idek =

Idek or IDEK (short for "I don't even know") may refer to:

- Jack Tramiel (Idek Trzmiel; 1928–2012), American businessman and Holocaust survivor
- Idek, a character played by Blake Ritson in the 2008 television film God on Trial
- "IDEK", a 2020 song by Lio Rush

== See also ==
- IDK (disambiguation)
