= Quincy Regional Airport =

Airport serving Quincy, Illinois, United States

Quincy Regional Airport Baldwin Field

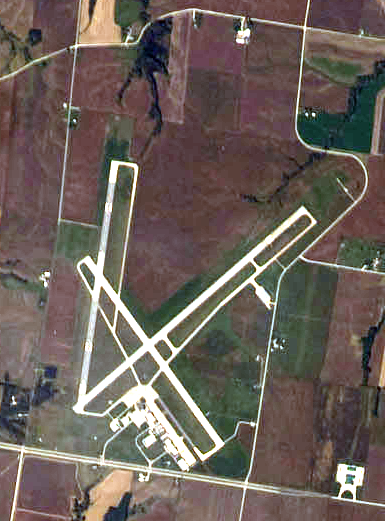
- NASA astronaut photo, 2008
- IATA: UIN; ICAO: KUIN; FAA LID: UIN; WMO: 72443

Summary
- Airport type: Public
- Owner: City of Quincy
- Serves: Quincy, Illinois
- Location: Gilmer Township, Adams County, Illinois
- Elevation AMSL: 769 ft (234 m)
- Coordinates: 39°56′34″N 091°11′41″W
- Website: Quincy Regional Airport

Maps
- FAA airport diagram
- Interactive map of Quincy Regional Airport

Runways
Direction	Length		Surface
Direction	ft	m	Surface
4/22	7,098	2,163	Asphalt/concrete
13/31	5,397	1,645	Asphalt

Statistics
- Aircraft operations (2019): 19,444
- Based aircraft (2021): 54
- Source: Federal Aviation Administration

Quincy Regional Airport (IATA: UIN, ICAO: KUIN, FAA LID: UIN; Baldwin Field) is a city-owned airport 12 miles east of Quincy, a city in Adams County, Illinois, United States. It is used for general aviation but also sees Contour Airlines flights to Chicago's O'Hare International Airport and Nashville, a service which is subsidized by the federal government's Essential Air Service program at a cost of $1,956,856 (per year). The Federal Aviation Administration (FAA) National Plan of Integrated Airport Systems for 2023–2027 categorized it as a national non-primary commercial service facility.

The first airline flights were on Mid-Continent in 1947; successor Braniff left in 1959. TWA arrived in 1948 and left in 1953-54; Ozark arrived in 1950 and left in 1982.

It is the least busy of the 12 commercial airports in Illinois.

Quincy has a solar panel project that was finished in early 2023.

The airport has often played host to events held by the International Stinson Club, including fly-ins, job fairs, and more.

== Facilities ==
The airport covers 1,101 acres (446 ha) at an elevation of 769 feet (234 m). It has two runways: the primary runway 4/22 is 7,098 by 150 feet (2,163 x 46 m) and made of asphalt/concrete and the crosswind runway 13/31 is 5,397 by 150 feet (1,645 x 46 m) and made of asphalt.

For the twelve month period ending January 1, 2019, the airport had 19,444 aircraft operations, an average of 53 per day: 80% general aviation, 20% air taxi and less than 1% military. In July 2021, there were 54 aircraft based at this airport: 33 single-engine, 13 jet, 7 multi-engine, and 1 ultra-light.

This airport does not have a control tower and operates as a non-towered airport.

In celebration of the 2018 Illinois Bicentennial, Quincy Regional Airport was selected as one of the Illinois 200 Great Places by the American Institute of Architects Illinois component (AIA Illinois).

== Airline and destinations ==
=== Passenger ===
Airlines	Destinations
Contour Airlines	Chicago–O'Hare Nashville

=== Historical airline service: 1950s to the present ===
In 1950, Trans World Airlines (TWA) was operating two daily Douglas DC-3 services with a westbound routing of Boston - Albany, NY - Pittsburgh - Chicago - Peoria, IL - Quincy - Kansas City - Topeka - Wichita and an eastbound routing of Kansas City - Quincy - Peoria - Chicago. Ozark Air Lines was serving the airport in 1951 with four DC-3 flights a day operating a twice daily roundtrip routing of St. Louis - Quincy - Keokuk, IA - Burlington, IA - Moline, IL. In 1953, Braniff International Airways was operating two daily DC-3 services with a southbound flight operating a routing of Minneapolis/St. Paul, MN - Rochester, MN - Austin, MN - Mason City, IA - Waterloo, IA - Des Moines - Ottumwa, IA - Quincy - St. Louis and a northbound flight operating St. Louis - Quincy - Ottumwa - Des Moines. TWA was no longer serving Quincy by the mid 1950s with Braniff ceasing its service in 1959 while Ozark continued to serve the airport.

By 1967, Ozark was operating ten departures every weekday from Quincy flown with Fairchild F-27 and Fairchild Hiller FH-227 turboprops as well as with DC-3 and Martin 4-0-4 piston-powered prop aircraft with non-stop service to St. Louis, Burlington, Columbia, MO, Kirksville, MO and Springfield, IL, and direct, no change of plane flights to Chicago O'Hare Airport, Des Moines, Bloomington, IL, Galesburg, IL, Joplin, MO and Springfield, MO. By 1975, another airline was serving Quincy besides Ozark: commuter air carrier Air Illinois operating de Havilland Canada DHC-6 Twin Otter turboprops on nonstop flights from St. Louis and Springfield, IL, with a total of four flights every weekday while at this same time Ozark was operating all of its flights into Quincy with Fairchild Hiller FH-227 turboprops with six flights every weekday.

In the late 1970s, Air Illinois provided non-stop service to St. Louis. According to the Official Airline Guide (OAG), by 1981 Ozark was operating all of its Quincy flights with McDonnell Douglas DC-9-30 jetliners with four departures every weekday on non-stop flights to St. Louis and Burlington as well as direct, no change of plane jet service to Chicago O'Hare Airport, New Orleans and Rockford, IL with direct one stop DC-9 service being operated from Kansas City. However, Ozark was no longer serving Quincy by 1982.

In 1985, the only airline serving Quincy was Britt Airways with non-stop flights from Chicago O'Hare Airport, St. Louis, Bloomington, IL, Burlington, IA, and Galesburg, IL, operated with Beechcraft 99 and Swearingen Metroliner commuter propjets.

The airport was also formerly served by Trans World Express operated by Air Midwest in 1989 with Swearingen Metroliner commuter propjets and later by Trans States Airlines from the early to mid 1990s with British Aerospace BAe Jetstream 31 and Swearingen Metroliner commuter propjets with both airlines operating these services via respective code sharing agreements on behalf of Trans World Airlines (TWA) with nonstop flights from the TWA hub in St. Louis. In 1995, United Express, flying on behalf of United Airlines via a code sharing agreement, was operating non-stop as well as direct one-stop service from the United hub at Chicago O'Hare Airport and was also operating non-stop flights from Burlington, IA and Springfield, IL flown with Embraer EMB-120 Brasilia and Beechcraft 1900 commuter propjets. Other regional airlines serving Quincy in the past included American Eagle (airline brand) in 1989 operating Short 360 commuter turboprops on behalf of American Airlines via a code sharing agreement and Great Lakes Airlines in 1991 operating Beechcraft 1900 commuter propjets.

On November 6, 2006, Mesa Airlines announced new non-stop service to Chicago Midway International Airport and Kirksville Regional Airport would begin in February 2007, operated by subsidiary Air Midwest. However, nine months after starting the service, Mesa announced they would drop Quincy on November 9, 2007.

In November 2022, Quincy was being served by Cape Air via the federal Essential Air Service (EAS) program. Cape Air then requested they be released from their contract to serve Quincy due to pilot staffing issues, and Southern Airways Express was subsequently chosen to replace Cape Air effective December 1, 2022. According to the Flight Aware website, Southern Airways Express used to operate Cessna 208 Caravan turboprop aircraft on their nonstop flights to Chicago and St. Louis from Quincy. In September 2025, Contour Airlines took over service to Quincy, with nonstop flights to Chicago O'Hare Airport. In June of 2026, Contour added flights from Quincy to Nashville.

== Ground transportation ==
Quincy Transit Lines, which provides public transit service to the Quincy area, does not serve the airport.

== Incidents ==
On November 19, 1996, United Express Flight 5925 from Chicago via Burlington, Iowa, crashed on landing at Quincy. A Beechcraft King Air was attempting to takeoff on an intersecting runway while the United Express Beechcraft 1900C was landing; both aircraft collided at the runway intersection. All 12 persons on board the B1900 as well as two persons on board the King Air were killed.

== See also ==
- List of airports in Illinois
- Quincy station

== Other sources ==
- Essential Air Service documents (Docket OST-2003-14492) from the U.S. Department of Transportation:
  - Order 2005-1-17: selecting Trans States Airlines, Inc., d/b/a American Connection, to provide essential air service at Decatur, Illinois, for a new two-year period beginning April 1, 2005, at a subsidy rate of $954,404 annually, and selecting Corporate Airlines, Inc., d/b/a American Connection, to provide essential air service at Quincy, Illinois, for a new two-year period beginning August 1, 2005, at a subsidy rate of $1,097,406 annually.
  - Order 2007-3-10: selecting Great Lakes Aviation, Ltd., to provide essential air service at Quincy, Illinois, for a two-year period at subsidies of $1,532,891 for the first year and $1,421,614 for the second year.
  - Order 2009-10-13: selecting Hyannis Air Service, Inc. d/b/a Cape Air, to provide subsidized essential air service (EAS) at Marion/Herrin, Quincy, and Cape Girardeau, for a two-year period beginning when Cape Air inaugurates full EAS at each of the three communities and ending at the close of the 24th month thereafter, at a combined annual subsidy rate of $5,469,768 ($2,053,783 for Marion/Herrin, $1,946,270 for Quincy, and $1,469,715 for Cape Girardeau). The Department is selecting Multi-Aero, Inc. d/b/a Air Choice One to provide subsidized EAS at Decatur, Illinois, and Burlington, Iowa, for a two-year period beginning when it inaugurates full EAS and ending at the close of the 24th month thereafter, at a combined annual subsidy of $5,253,644 ($3,082,403 for Decatur and $2,171,241 for Burlington). The Department is selecting Great Lakes Aviation, Ltd. to provide subsidized EAS at Fort Leonard Wood, Missouri, for the two-year period from November 1, 2009, through October 31, 2011, at an annual subsidy of $1,292,906.
  - Order 2011-4-12: re-selecting Hyannis Air Service, Inc. d/b/a Cape Air, to provide essential air service (EAS) at Marion/Herrin, Illinois (Marion) and Quincy, Illinois/Hannibal, Missouri (Quincy), and Cape Girardeau/Sikeston, Missouri (Cape Girardeau), for the four-year period from December 1, 2011, through November 30, 2015, for a combined annual subsidy rate of $5,689,438 ($2,104,616 for Marion, $1,956,856 for Quincy, and $1,627,966 for Cape Girardeau). Marion and Quincy will receive 36 weekly round trips and Cape Girardeau will receive 24 weekly round trips. All service will operate nonstop to/from Lambert-St. Louis International Airport (St. Louis) using eight- or nine-passenger Cessna 402 aircraft.
