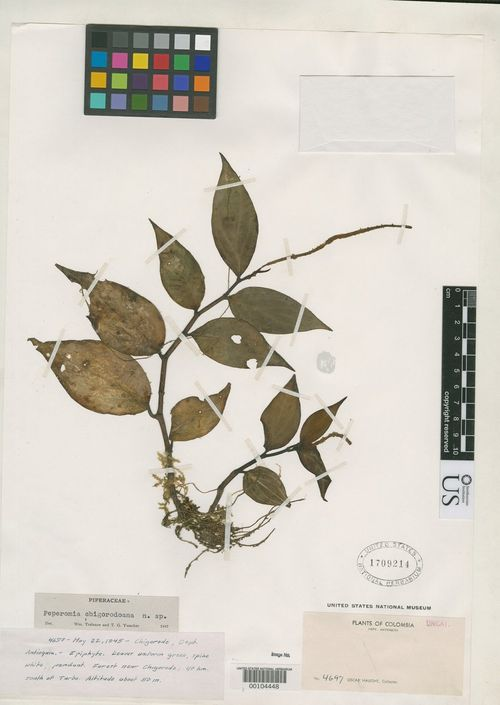

Scientific classification
- Kingdom: Plantae
- Clade: Tracheophytes
- Clade: Angiosperms
- Clade: Magnoliids
- Order: Piperales
- Family: Piperaceae
- Genus: Peperomia
- Species: P. chigorodoana

Binomial name
- Peperomia chigorodoana Yunck.

= Peperomia chigorodoana =

Species of plant

Peperomia chigorodoana is a species of epiphyte in the genus Peperomia that is endemic in Colombia. It grows on wet tropical biomes. Its conservation status is Threatened.

== Description ==
The first specimens where collected in Chigorodo, Colombia.

Peperomia chigorodoana is a medium-sized epiphyte with a stem 3–4 mm thick, ascending to 15 cm (5.9 in) or more, with internodes 1–2 cm long. The stem is thinly covered with soft hairs when young, quickly becoming hairless. The leaves are lance-ovate, measuring 2.5–4 cm wide by 6–9 cm long, with an acuminate apex and base that is rounded or somewhat narrowed and obtuse. They are 9-plinerved within about the lowermost 2 cm, nearly hairless, with appressed fine hairs toward the apex, yellow glandular-dotted, drying membranous and translucent. The petioles are stout, 2–3 mm long, or up to 10 mm on lowermost leaves, grooved and fringed with fine hairs. The terminal spikes are 2 mm thick and 9–10 cm long, on peduncles 10 mm long. The bracts are round-peltate. The fruit is subcylindrical, 1.5 mm long, with an obliquely shield-shaped apex and central stigma.

It is close to P. farctifolia but differs markedly in its scarcely ciliate, membranous leaves versus the more hairy, thicker leaves of that species.

== Taxonomy and naming ==
It was described in 1950 by Truman G. Yuncker in The Piperaceae of northern South America 2, from specimens collected by Oscar Lee Haught. It received its name from location where the first specimens were collected.

== Distribution and habitat ==
It is endemic in Colombia. It grows on a epiphyte environment and is a herb. In Colombia, its elevation range is 50 meters (160 ft). It grows on wet tropical biomes.

== Conservation ==
This species is assessed as Threatened, in a preliminary report.
