= Villalba Municipality =

Municipality in Nueva Esparta, Venezuela

Villalba Municipality Municipio Villalba
- Municipality
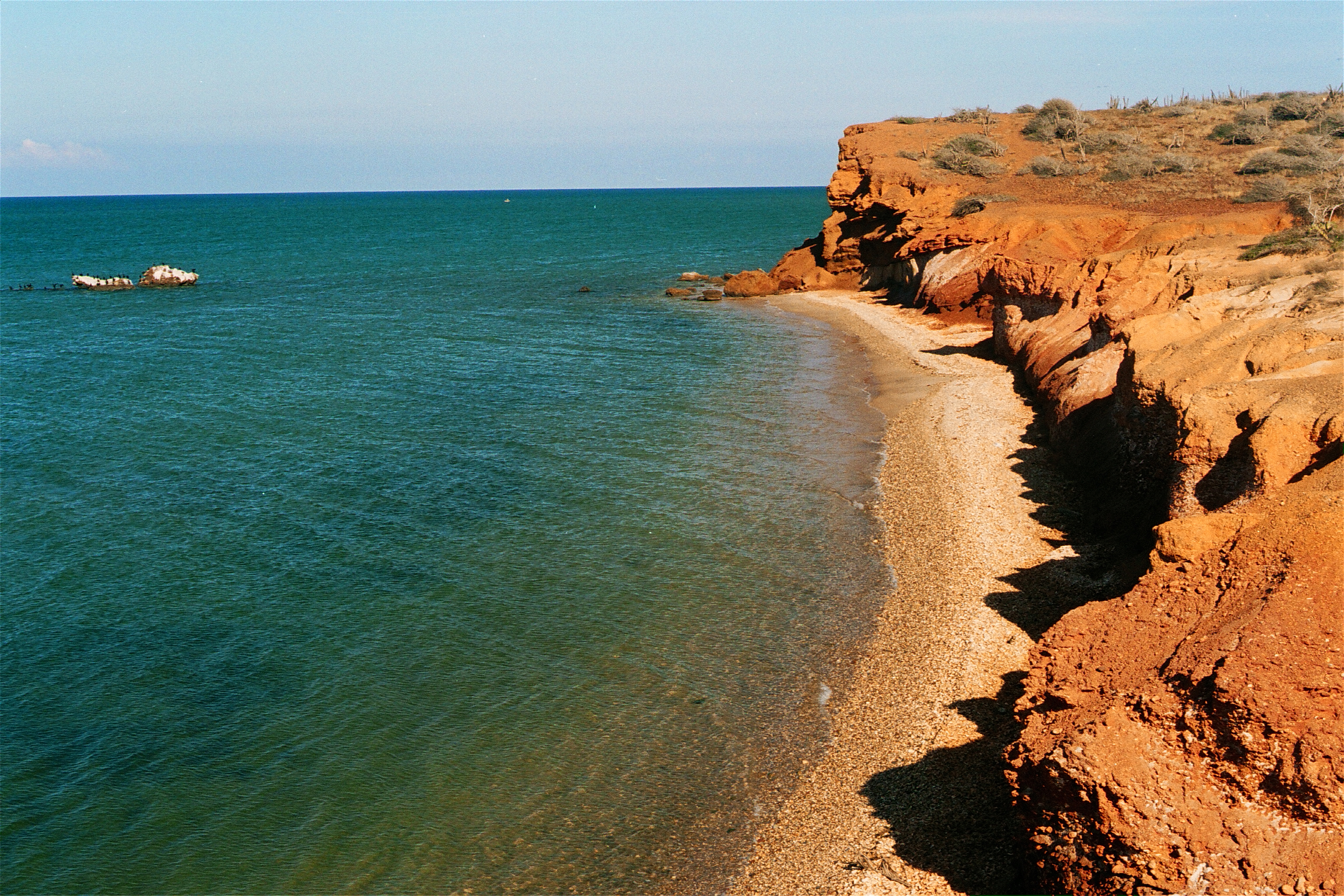

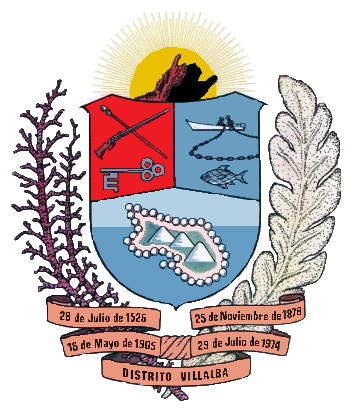
- Flag Seal

- Location in Nueva Esparta

- Location in Venezuela
- Country: Venezuela
- State: Falcón
- Founded: 1526
- Municipal seat: San Pedro de Coche

Government
  - Mayor: Freddy Serrano Arismendi (PSUV)

Area
  - Total: 93.4 km^{2} (36.1 sq mi)

Population (2011)
  - Total: 9,986
  - Density: 107/km^{2} (277/sq mi)
- Time zone: UTC−4 (VET)

Villalba Municipality is located in Nueva Esparta state, Venezuela. The municipality has a total surface of 55 km^{2} and it has some 9,986 inhabitant (2011 census). Its capital is San Pedro de Coche.
