= Jacksonville Municipal Airport (Illinois) =

Airport in Illinois, U.S.

Coordinates: 39°46′28″N 090°14′19″W

Jacksonville Municipal Airport is a civil, public-use airport located three miles (4.8 km) north of the town of Jacksonville, Illinois. The airport is publicly owned by the City of Jacksonville. The airport's first Master Plan was introduced in 1948.

The airport received $2.14 million from the State of Illinois as part of the REBUILD Illinois program during the COVID-19 pandemic. Money was allocated both to acquiring snow removal equipment and constructing a partial parallel taxiway to the end of runway 22.

== Facilities and aircraft ==
The airport has two asphalt runways. Runway 13/31 is 5,000 ft × 75 ft (1,524 m × 23 m), while runway 4/22 is 4,001 ft × 75 ft (1,220 m × 23 m).

For the 12-month period ending February 29, 2020, the airport averages 33 aircraft operations per day, or about 12,000 per year. This consists of 92% general aviation and 8% air taxi. For that same period, there are 27 aircraft based on the field: 23 single-engine, 3 multi-engine, and 1 helicopter.

The airport operates its own fixed-base operator (FBO) on the airport, offering services like fuel, aircraft parking, hangars, a passenger terminal, and courtesy cars. Flight training, aircraft rental, and pilot supplies are also available. Maintenance facilities are also available at the airport.

== Attractions ==
The airport is located near both Illinois College and the former MacMurray College. The closest major airport is Abraham Lincoln Capital Airport in Springfield, Illinois.

The airport is home to EAA Chapter 137, which hosts a variety of events at the airport, like pancake breakfast fundraisers and weekly meetings. In 2022, the chapter hosted a stop for members of the International Stinson Club during the Stinson Summit.

== See also ==
- List of airports in Illinois
