= Taima-Taima =

Archaeological site in Venezuela

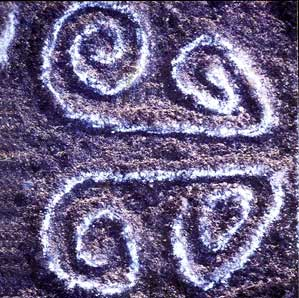
Pre-Clovis petroglyphs in Taima-Taima

Taima-Taima is a Late Pleistocene archaeological site located about 20 kilometers east of Santa Ana de Coro, in the Falcón State of Venezuela. The human settlement at Taima-Taima started about 14,000 years ago.

== History of research ==
The site was investigated starting in 1964 by José Cruxent (1911-2005), Alan Bryan, Rodolfo Casamiquela, Ruth Gruhn, and Claudio Ochsenius.

The earliest human occupation goes back to 14,200-12,980 years ago. This indicates a pre-Clovis settlement of South America; the site is used as evidence for people arriving to South America earlier than previously believed.

Cruxent discovered a Notiomastodon pelvic bone that was pierced by a stone spearpoint. Geological and radiocarbon dating of the find both indicate the date of 13,000 BP (11,000 BC).

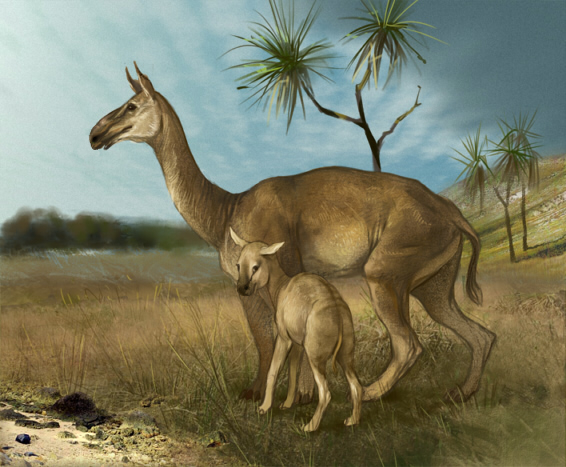
Macrauchenia, a close relative of Xenorhinotherium

Fossils of Xenorhinotherium (an extinct animal similar to camels), dating from the Pleistocene Epoch, have been found in Taima-Taima. Other such finds were made in Brazil, and also in Venezuela in the localities of Muaco, and Cuenca del Lago.

=== El Jobo projectile points ===
At Taima-Taima, José Cruxent discovered El Jobo projectile points, which are believed to be the earliest such artefacts in South America, going back to 16,000 BP. This was a major discovery in Paleoindian archaeology.

The bi-pointed El Jobo points were found in the valley of Pedregal River, and were mostly distributed in north-western Venezuela; from the Gulf of Venezuela to the high mountains and valleys. The population using them were hunter-gatherers that seemed to remain within a certain circumscribed territory. El Jobo points were probably used for hunting large mammals.

The Joboid series of points have been grouped into four successive complexes. The earliest was Camare, then Las Lagunas, El Jobo, and Las Casitas. The Camare and Las Lagunas complexes lack stone projectile points. The Camare tool complex has been dated to 22,000-20,000 years ago. El Jobo tool complex has been dated to 16,000-9,000 years ago.

== See also ==
- Urumaco
- Pre-Columbian period in Venezuela

== Bibliography ==
- Ochsenius, C. and R. Gruhn, eds. (1979) Taima-taima. A Late Paleo-Indian Kill Site in Northernmost South America. Final Reports of the 1976 Excavations. CIPICS/South American Quaternary Documentation Program. Printed in the Federal Republic of Germany (includes chapters by J. M. Cruxent, A. L. Bryan, R. Gruhn, R. M. Casamiquela and C. Ochsenius)
- Jaimes Queros, A. (2003) El Vano, una nueva localidad paleo-india en el nor-occidente de Venezuela. Maguaré No. 17, pp. 46–64. Gerardo Ardila Calderón, ed. Revista del Departamento de Antropología de la Universidad Nacional de Colombia. Bogotá Colombia.
- Oliver, J.R., Alexander, C.S. (2003). Ocupaciones humanas del Plesitoceno terminal en el Occidente de Venezuela. Maguare, 17 83-246
