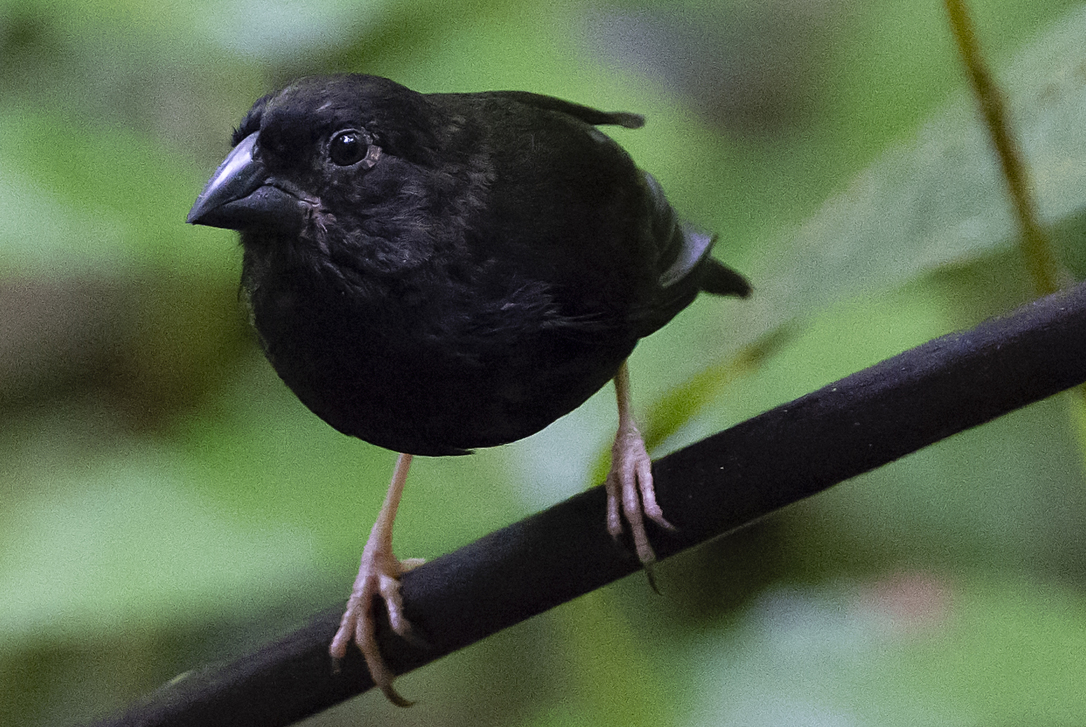

Conservation status
- Endangered (IUCN 3.1)

Scientific classification
- Kingdom: Animalia
- Phylum: Chordata
- Class: Aves
- Order: Passeriformes
- Family: Thraupidae
- Genus: Melanospiza
- Species: M. richardsoni

Binomial name
- Melanospiza richardsoni (Cory, 1886)

= Saint Lucia black finch =

Species of bird

The Saint Lucia black finch (Melanospiza richardsoni) is an Endangered species of bird in the family Thraupidae, the tanagers and allies. It is endemic to Saint Lucia.

== Taxonomy and systematics ==
The Saint Lucia black finch was formally described as Loxigilla richardsoni in 1886 by the American ornithologist Charles B. Cory. Cory named the species for W. E. Richardson, who provided him the type specimen "procured in Santa Lucia". In 1898 Robert Ridgway erected genus Melanospiza with Loxigilla richardsoni as the type species. The Saint Lucia black finch shares the genus with the black-faced grassquit (M. bicolor).

The Saint Lucia black finch is monotypic.

== Description ==
The Saint Lucia black finch is 13 to 14 cm (5.1 to 5.5 in) long and weighs 18 to 23 g (0.63 to 0.81 oz). It is a stocky finch-like bird with a thick bill and a shortish tail. The species is sexually dimorphic. Adult males are almost entirely deep black except for the slate-colored undersides of the primaries. Adult females have a grayish head. Their upperparts, wings, and tail are brown and their underparts light brown. Both sexes have a black iris. Males have a black bill and pinkish legs. Females have a grayish horn to black bill and pink legs. Juveniles resemble adult females.

The similar Lesser Antillean bullfinch is larger but has a red throat, a smaller bill, and black legs.

== Distribution and habitat ==
The Saint Lucia black finch is endemic to the island of Saint Lucia in the south-central Lesser Antilles. It inhabits tropical evergreen forest and secondary forest, where it favors somewhat moist areas with dense undergrowth, though it also is found in semi-arid forest. These conditions are most prevalent in the mountains. Sources differ on its elevational ceiling, variously stating it as 700 m (2,300 ft), 950 m (3,100 ft), and 1,000 m (3,300 ft).

== Behavior ==
=== Movement ===
The Saint Lucia black finch is a sedentary year-round resident.

=== Feeding ===
The Saint Lucia black finch's diet has not been studied but is assumed to be arthropods, fruits, and seeds. It forages mostly among leaf litter on the ground in dense vegetation. It is often seen in pairs.

=== Breeding ===
The Saint Lucia black finch breeds between November and June. Its nest is a loose sphere with a side entrance, made from leaves, twigs, and other plant materials. It is typically in a small palm or shrub about 3 m (10 ft) above the ground. The clutch is two eggs that are white with brownish-red markings. Nothing else is known about the species' breeding biology.

=== Vocalization ===
The Saint Lucia black finch's song is a "[b]urry tick-zwee-swisiwis-you with accents on the 2nd and last notes". It has been likened to that of a bananaquit (Coereba flaveola). It also makes "a sharp tiiip!" call.

== Status ==
The IUCN in 1988 originally assessed the Saint Lucia black finch as Threatened, then in 1994 as Near Threatened, and since 2000 as Endangered. It has a very small range of about 380 km^{2} (150 sq mi); its estimated population of between 250 and 999 mature individuals is believed to be decreasing. "The clearing of undergrowth, particularly in timber plantations, renders areas completely unsuitable for this species and is probably the major threat. Introduced mongooses and rats may also predate eggs, nestlings and adults." It is considered "uncommon and local". It does occur in at least two protected forest preserves.
