= José Cruxent =

Spanish archaeologist (1911–2005)

José María Cruxent
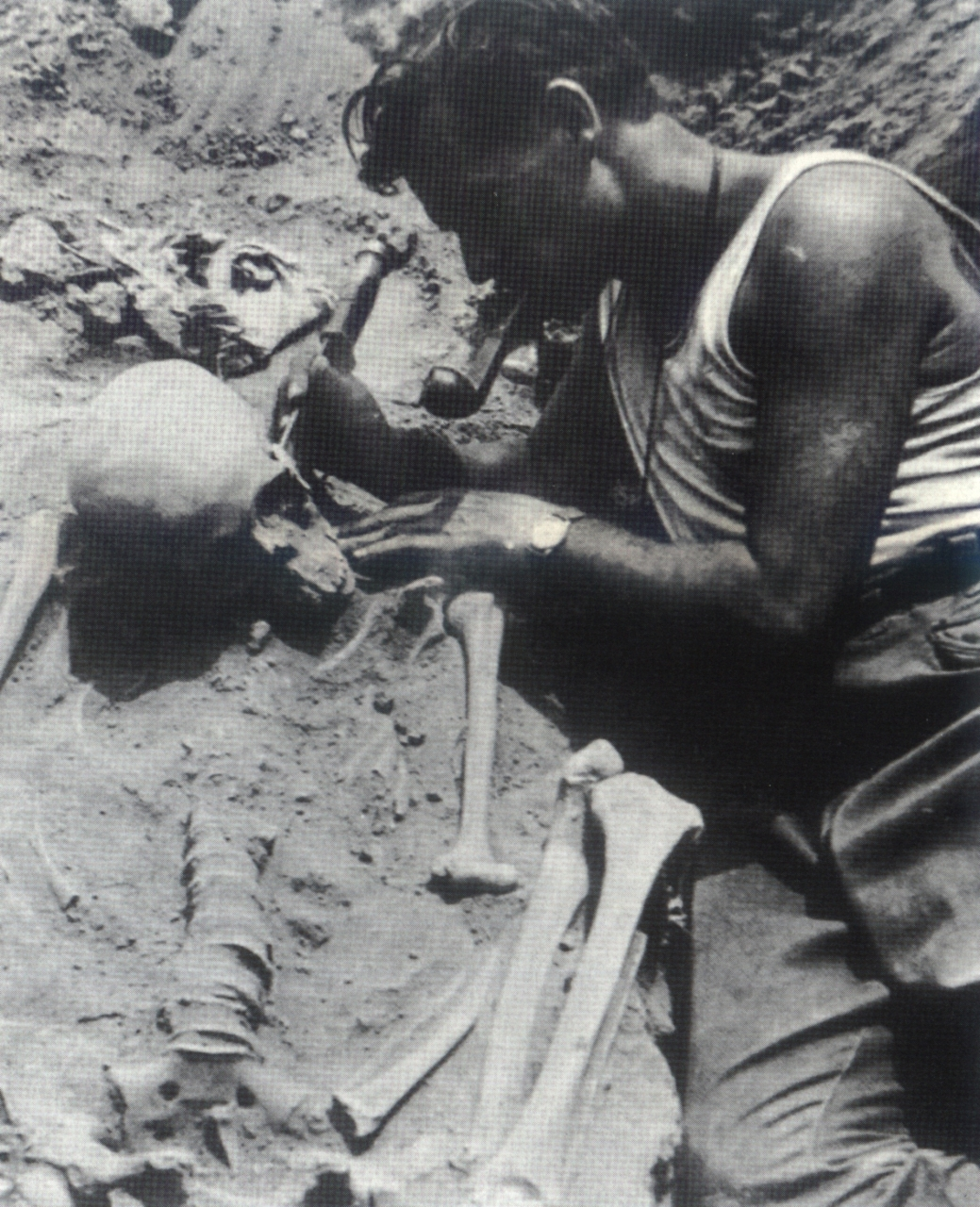
- Photograph by Unknown
- Born: January 16, 1911; Spain
- Died: February 23, 2005 (aged 93–94); Coro, Venezuela
- Occupations: Professor and archaeologist
- Writing career
- Subjects: Taima-Taima, Nueva Cádiz, Venezuelan Archaeology, La Isabella

José María Cruxent (January 16, 1911 – February 23, 2005) was a professional archaeologist considered to be the "Father of Scientific Archaeology" in Venezuela. He was born in Barcelona, Catalonia, Spain. Cruxent is known for making significant contributions to understanding the cultural history of Venezuela from the Paleoindian period to the early Colonial period.

== Education ==
Cruxent was a student in archaeology at the University of Barcelona until the Spanish Civil War cut short his academic career in 1939. After the war, he moved to Venezuela where he eventually gained renown for reshaping its archaeology by applying the scientific method in field work (something that had been rare in archaeological excavations there).

== Discoveries ==
In 1952 Cruxent participate in the Franco-Venezuelan expedition in search of the sources of the Orinoco River and the demarcation of the border with Brazil. the Doctor Marcel Roche invites him to the Archeology department of the Venezuelan Institute of Scientific Research (IVIC); and in collaboration with the American archaeologist Irving Rouse write and publish "Chronological Archeology of Venezuela", in 1958.

Cruxent was responsible for the discovery of archaeological sites at Nueva Cádiz and Taima-Taima. He extended the archaeological evidence for human presence in South America backward into the Late Pleistocene epoch.

It was at Taima-Taima that he discovered El Jobo projectile points and other stone artifacts dating to as early as 13,000 B.P., a major discovery in Paleoindian archaeology.

Cruxent was later asked to excavate La Isabella, the first Spanish settlement, as well as the tomb of Christopher Columbus in the Ciudad Colonial de Santo Domingo.

== Museum Administration ==
Cruxent eventually became the head curator and archaeologist for the Museo de Ciencias Naturales and founded the Department of Archaeology at the Instituto Venezolano de Investigaciones Científicas in Caracas.

== Artistic career ==
In the latter portion of his life, Cruxent became an artist in the abstract expressionism movement. His paintings often depicted his archaeological discoveries and were reminiscent of cave painting. He did not stick to one medium, but rather experimented with many different materials and textures. He continued to work as a professor and artist until his death in 2005 at the age of 94.

== Publications ==
=== Books ===
- Venezuelan Archaeology, 1963
- An Archaeological Chronology of Venezuela, V2: Social Science Monographs, V6, 20, 1964
- Archaeology at La Isabela: America's First European Town, 2002

=== Articles ===
- Early Man in the West Indies, 1997
- Medieval Foothold in the Americas,1997
- An El Jobo Mastodon Kill at Tiama-Taima, Venezuela, 1978
- Archaeology of Cotua Island, Amazonas Territory, Venezuela, 1950
- Determination of the Provenience of Majolica Pottery Found in the Caribbean Area Using Its Gamma-Ray Induced Thermoluminescence, 1975
