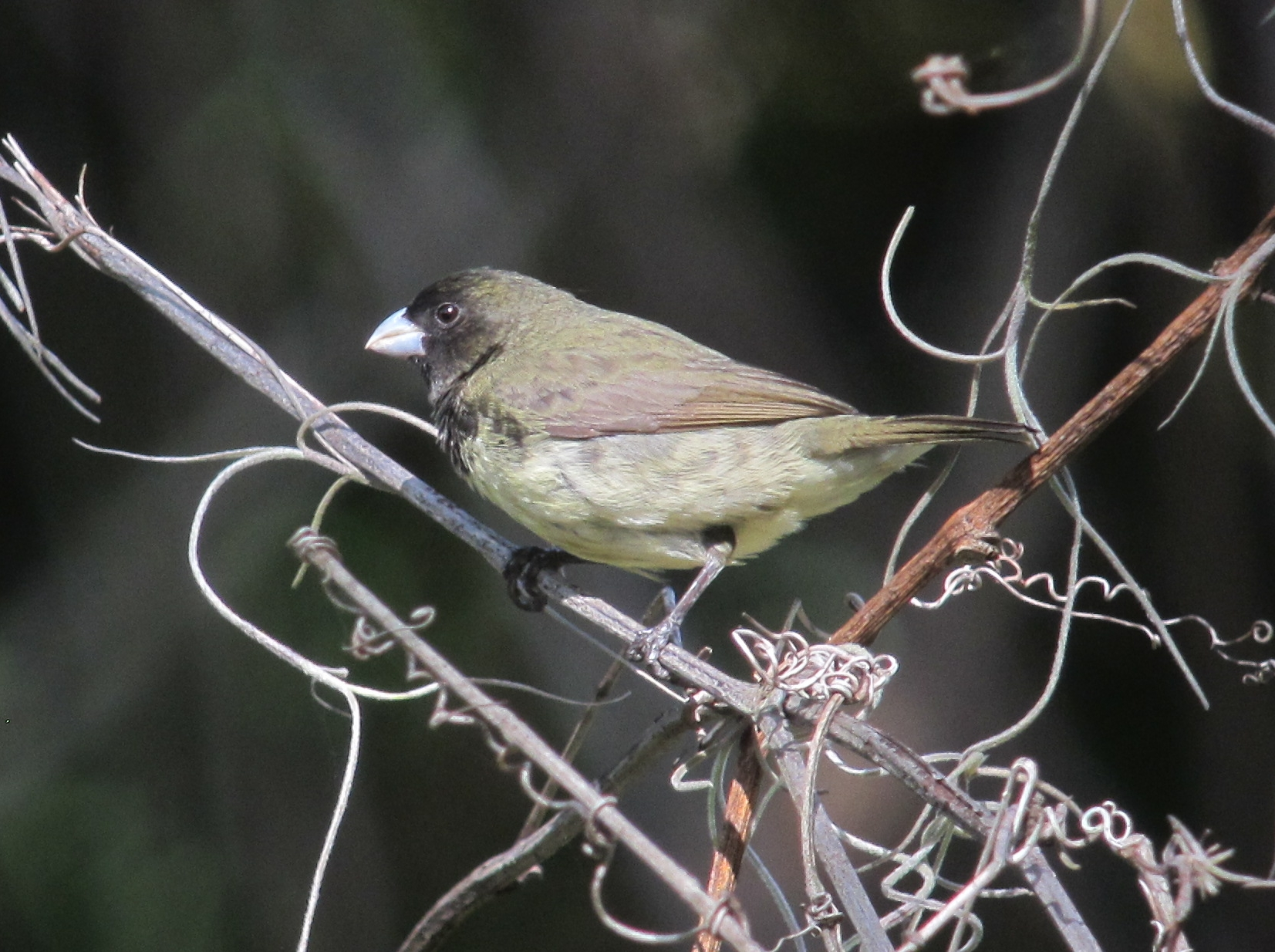
- Black-faced grassquit (Melanospiza bicolor)

Scientific classification
- Kingdom: Animalia
- Phylum: Chordata
- Class: Aves
- Order: Passeriformes
- Family: Thraupidae
- Genus: Melanospiza; Ridgway, 1897

Type species
- Loxigilla richardsoni Cory, 1886

= Melanospiza =

Genus of birds

Melanospiza is a genus of Neotropical birds in the tanager family Thraupidae.

== Taxonomy and species list ==
The genus Melanospiza was introduced in 1897 by the American ornithologist Robert Ridgway with the Saint Lucia black finch as the type species. The name combines the Ancient Greek melas meaning "black" and spiza meaning "finch". Although traditionally placed with the buntings and New World sparrows in the family Emberizidae, molecular phylogenetic studies have shown that the genus is a member of the tanager family Thraupidae and belongs to the subfamily Coerebinae which also contains Darwin's finches.

The genus contains the following two species:

Genus Melanospiza – Ridgway, 1897 – two species
Common name	Scientific name and subspecies	Range	Size and ecology	IUCN status and estimated population
Saint Lucia black finch	Melanospiza richardsoni (Cory, 1886)	Saint Lucia	Size: Habitat: Diet:	EN
Black-faced grassquit Male Female	Melanospiza bicolor (Linnaeus, 1766) Eight subspecies: M. b. bicolor (Linnaeus, 1766); M. b. marchii (Baird, SF, 1864); M. b. omissa (Jardine, 1847); M. b. huilae (Miller, AH, 1952); M. b. grandior (Cory, 1887); M. b. johnstonei (Lowe, 1906); M. b. sharpei (Hartert, 1893); M. b. tortugensis (Cory, 1909)	West Indies, northern coasts of Colombia and Venezuela	Size: Habitat: Diet:	LC
