= Pre-Columbian period in Venezuela =

Venezuela prior to European Colonization

The Pre-Columbian period in Venezuela refers to the period before the Spanish colonization of the Americas in the 16th century, known as the Pre-Columbian era. It covers the history of what are now known as the Indigenous peoples of Venezuela.

Archeologists have discovered evidence of the earliest known inhabitants of the Venezuelan area in the form of leaf-shaped flake tools, together with chopping and plano–convex scraping implements exposed on the high riverine terraces of the Pedregal River in western Venezuela. Late Pleistocene hunting artifacts, including spear tips, come from a similar site in northwestern Venezuela known as El Jobo. According to radiocarbon dating, these date from 13,000 to 7000 BC.

Taima-Taima, yellow Muaco and El Jobo in Falcón are some of the sites that have yielded archeological material from these times. These groups co-existed with megafauna like megatherium, glyptodonts and toxodonts.

Archaeologists identify a Meso-Indian period from 7000 to 5000 B.C.to 1000 A.C. In this period, hunters and gatherers of megafauna started to turn to other food sources and established the first tribal structures.

Beginning around 1000 A.C. archaeologists speak of the Neo-Indian period, which ends with the European Conquest and Colony period.

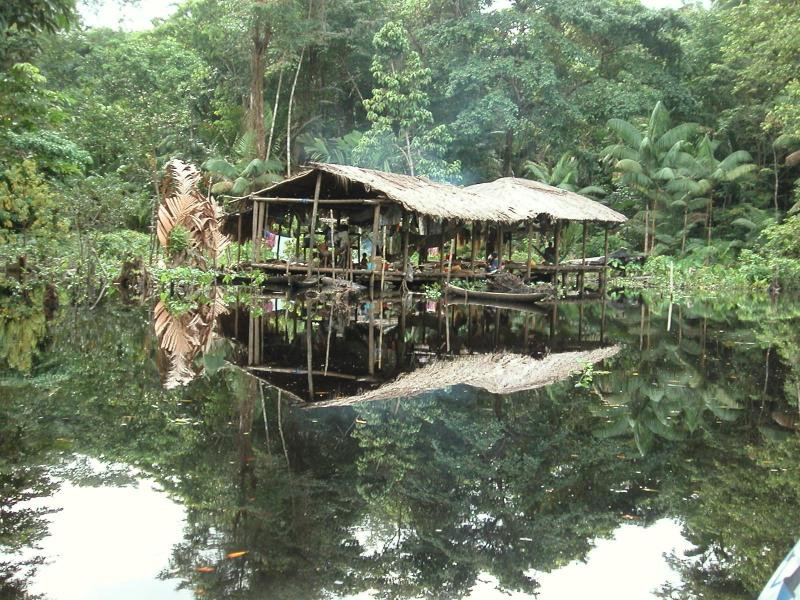
A palafito like the ones seen by Amerigo Vespucci

It is not known how many people lived in Venezuela before the Spanish Conquest; it may have been around a million people, and in addition to today's peoples included groups such as the Lokono, Kalina, and Timoto-cuicas. The number was much reduced after the Conquest, mainly through the spread of new diseases from Europe. There were two main north–south axes of pre-Columbian population, producing maize in the west and manioc in the east. Large parts of the Llanos plains were cultivated through a combination of slash and burn and permanent settled agriculture. The Indigenous peoples of Venezuela had already encountered crude oils and asphalts that seeped up through the ground to the surface. Known to the locals as mene, the thick, black liquid was primarily used for medicinal purposes, as an illumination source, and for the caulking of canoes.

In the 16th century when Spanish colonization began in Venezuelan territory, the population of several Indigenous peoples such as the Mariches (descendants of the Caribes) declined. Native caciques (leaders) such as Guaicaipuro (c. 1530–1568) and Tamanaco (died 1573) attempted to resist Spanish incursions, but the newcomers ultimately subdued them. The founder of Caracas, Diego de Losada, ultimately put Tamanaco to death.
