= Tubores Municipality =

Tubores Municipality Municipio Tubores
- Municipality
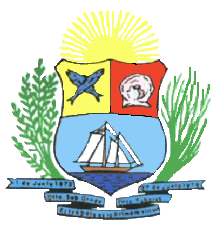
- Flag Coat of arms

- Location in Nueva Esparta

- Location in Venezuela
- Coordinates: 10°54′42″N 64°06′53″W
- Country: Venezuela
- State: Nueva Esparta
- Municipal seat: Punta de Piedras

Area
  - Total: 253.0 km^{2} (97.7 sq mi)
- Time zone: UTC−4 (VET)
- Website: Official website

Tubores is a municipality of the state of Nueva Esparta, Venezuela. Tubores includes part of Nueva Esparta's main island, Isla Margarita, as well as the whole of the sparsely inhabited island of Cubagua to the south. The capital is Punta de Piedras on Isla Margarita.
