= IDN =

IDN can refer to:

- Internationalized domain names, a system for domain names with characters that are not part of ASCII
- Institut Industriel du Nord, the former name of École Centrale de Lille
- Indonesia, the ISO 3-letter country code
- International Data Number, in the context of an X.121 address
- Identity driven networking, a form of network control
- Integrated data network, the digital data network developed by Reuters and dedicated to financial markets
- Integrated Delivery Network, a network of healthcare organizations, see IDS
- Intradermal nevus, a type of skin mole

== See also ==
- IDK
