= I Don't Know =

I Don't Know may refer to:

== Songs ==
- "I Don't Know" (Fiestar song), 2013
- "I Don't Know" (Honeyz song), 2000
- "I Don't Know" (Joanne song), 2001
- "I Don’t Know" (Paul McCartney song), 2018
- "I Don't Know" (Ruth Brown song), 1959
- "I Don't Know" (The Sheepdogs song), 2010
- "I Don't Know" (Willie Mabon song), 1952
- "I Don't Know!", by J-pop duo BaBe, 1987
- "I Don't Know", by The Beach Boys from the album The Smile Sessions, 2011
- "I Don't Know", by Beastie Boys from the album Hello Nasty
- "I Don't Know", an English version of the song "Je sais pas" performed by Celine Dion from the album Falling into You
- "I Don't Know", by Dredg, 2009
- "I Don't Know", by The Esquires, 1969
- "I Don't Know", by Farhan Akhtar from Bharat Ane Nenu, 2018
- "I Don't Know", by Lisa Hannigan from the album Sea Sew, 2009
- "I Don't Know", by Lostprophets from the album Start Something
- "I Don't Know", by Meek Mill
- "I Don't Know", by The Mekons from the album I Love Mekons, 1993
- "I Don't Know", by Mika Nakashima from the album Voice, 2009
- "I Don't Know", by Noa, 1994
- "I Don't Know", by Ozzy Osbourne from the album Blizzard of Ozz, 1980
- "I Don't Know", by Paul Revere & The Raiders from the album Alias Pink Puzz, 1969
- "I Don't Know", by The Replacements from the album Pleased to Meet Me, 1987
- "I Don't Know", by Slum Village from the album Fantastic, Vol. 2, 2000
- "I Don't Know", by T-ara from the EP Temptastic, 2010
- "I Don't Know", by Trevor Daniel from the EP Homesick, 2018
- "I Don't Know", by Usher from the album 8701, 2001
- "I Don't Know", by Erika, 2003
- “I Don’t Know” (Gabry Ponte with Erika) 2025

== Other uses ==
- I Don't Know (album), a 2023 album by Bdrmm
- I Don't Know, a 1972 short film directed by Penelope Spheeris
- I Don't Know (Nie wiem), a 1977 film directed by Krzysztof Kieślowski
- "I don't know", the name of the third baseman in Abbott and Costello's comedy routine "Who's on First?"

== See also ==
- "The Fear" (Lily Allen song), a 2009 song for which "I Don't Know" was the working title
- "I Dunno", a 2020 song by Tion Wayne
- IDN (disambiguation)
- IDK (disambiguation)
