= Andrés Miguel Salazar Marcano Airport =

Andrés Miguel Salazar Marcano Airport Aeropuerto Andrés Miguel Salazar Marcano
- Map with location of airport (click to enlarge)
- IATA: ICC; ICAO: SVIE

Summary
- Airport type: Public
- Operator: Government
- Serves: Isla de Coche, Venezuela
- Elevation AMSL: 10 ft (3.0 m)
- Coordinates: 10°47′40″N 063°58′50″W
- Interactive map of Andrés Miguel Salazar Marcano Airport

Runways
Direction	Length		Surface
Direction	m	ft	Surface
09/27	1,200	3,937	Asphalt
- Source: WAD GCM Google Maps

Andres Miguel Salazar Marcano Airport (Spanish: Aeropuerto Andrés Miguel Salazar Marcano) (IATA: ICC, ICAO: SVIE) is an airport serving Isla de Coche, an island in the Venezuelan state of Nueva Esparta.

The airport has been under the regional administration of the state of Nueva Esparta since 1992. For years it remained abandoned until 2006, when a major renovation began which included the extension of the runway.

The Margarita del Caribe Intl non-directional beacon (Ident: MT) is 7.3 nautical miles (13.5 km) northwest of the airport, on Isla de Margarita. The Margarita VOR-DME (Ident: MTA) is 7.3 nautical miles (13.5 km) north, on Santiago Mariño Caribbean International Airport.

== Facilities ==
The airport resides at an elevation of 10 feet (3 m) above mean sea level. It has one runway designated 09/27 with an asphalt surface measuring 1,200 by 30 metres (3,937 ft × 98 ft).

== See also ==
- Transport in Venezuela
- List of airports in Venezuela
