= International Stinson Club =

Club dedicated to Stinson aircraft

- Type: Non-profit / Enthusiast aviation club
- Legal status: Active
- Headquarters: California, U.S.
- Region served: U.S.
- Members: Pilots, mechanics, aviators
- Official language: English

The International Stinson Club is an organization of pilots, mechanics, and other aviators that is dedicated to flying, maintaining, and sharing knowledge of airplanes built by the Stinson Aircraft Company.

== Activities ==
The club serves to preserve historical information about the company, the family that started it, and its aircraft. They share best practices for maintenance, information about upgrades and supplemental type certificates, maintenance concerns, and piloting techniques.

The club holds regular Stinson Summits in which aircraft and put on display with aircraft owners and pilots on hand to answer questions, share knowledge, and give tours. Guest speakers, photo shoots, and communal meals are also regular events. Summits regularly attract dozens of Stinson aircraft, and summits also partner with car clubs that display vintage cars as well.

The club hosts fly-ins near its California headquarters, and it also awards pilots dedicated to the support and preservation of Stinson aircraft. It has a significant presence at the annual EAA AirVenture airshow in Oshkosh, Wisconsin.

The club has received support and funding from a variety of local governments to continue the work of the organization. In 2022, the government of Quincy, Illinois donated $3,000 for the club to host a membership convention at the Quincy Regional Airport.
