= Quincy station =

Quincy station may refer to:

- Quincy station (Amtrak), Illinois, served by the Illinois Zephyr and Carl Sandburg
- Quincy station (CTA), Chicago
- Quincy Police Station, Massachusetts
- Quincy Center station, Massachusetts, known as just "Quincy" from 1845 to 1959

== See also ==
- Quincy Adams station, Massachusetts
