= Inongo =

- Provincial capital and city
- Ville d'Inongo
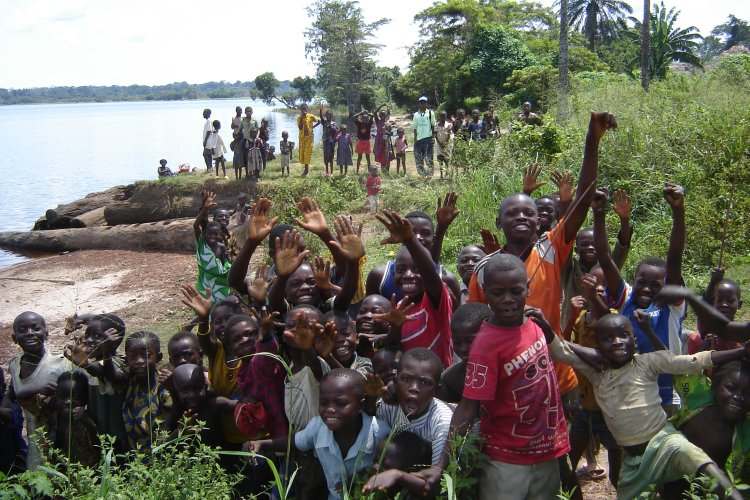

- Location in the Democratic Republic of the Congo
- Coordinates: 1°57′S 18°16′E
- Country: DR Congo
- Province: Mai-Ndombe
- Communes: Bonse, Mpolo, Mpongonzoli

Government
  - Mayor: Bombani Moteri

Population (2009)
  - Total: 45,159
- Time zone: UTC+1 (West Africa Time)
- Climate: Am
- National language: Lingala

Inongo is the capital of Mai-Ndombe Province in the western part of the Democratic Republic of the Congo. As of 2009 it had an estimated population of 45,159.

== Transport ==
The town is served by Inongo Airport.

== See also ==
- Roman Catholic Diocese of Inongo
