= Inus Airport =

Airport in Bougainville, Papua New Guinea

- IATA: IUS; ICAO: none

Summary
- Serves: Inus, Bougainville Island, Papua New Guinea
- Elevation AMSL: 15 m / 50 ft
- Coordinates: 05°46′59″S 155°09′00″E

Map
- Airport in Papua New Guinea
- Sources: GCM, theAirDB.com, iata.org

Inus Airport (IATA: IUS) is an airfield serving Inus, on the Bougainville Island, in Papua New Guinea.
