= Jaime Ortiz Betancur Airport =

Jaime Ortiz Betancur Airport Chigorodó Airport
- IATA: IGO; ICAO: SKIG

Summary
- Airport type: Public
- Serves: Chigorodó, Colombia
- Elevation AMSL: 110 ft (34 m)
- Coordinates: 7°40′40″N 76°41′00″W

Map
- Location within Antioquia Department Location within Colombia

Runways
Direction	Length		Surface
Direction	m	ft	Surface
17/35	1,035	3,396	Asphalt
- Sources: GCM

Jaime Ortiz Betancur Airport (IATA: IGO, ICAO: SKIG) is an airport serving the town of Chigorodó in the Antioquia Department of Colombia. The airport is on the north side of the town, across the small Guaduas River, which feeds into the Gulf of Urabá.

At one time during the early 1990s, the airport used to receive commercial airline service from Medellin on Aces Airlines.

== See also ==
- Transport in Colombia
- List of airports in Colombia
