= IDK =

IDK may refer to:

== Music ==
- IDK (rapper), British-American rapper
- "IDK" (song), a 2020 song by Lil Tecca
- "IDK Y", a 2022 song by Joel who

== Other uses ==
- Abbreviation for I Don't Know
- Indulkana Airport (IATA: IDK), in Indulkana, South Australia, Australia; see List of airports by IATA airport code: I
- Internationale der Kriegsdienstgegner/innen, the German section of War Resisters' International
- Internal derangement of the knee, an alternative named for an anterior cruciate ligament injury

== See also ==
- I Don't Know (disambiguation)
