= Coche Island =

Island of the Nueva Esparta State of Venezuela

Coche
Native name: Isla de Coche
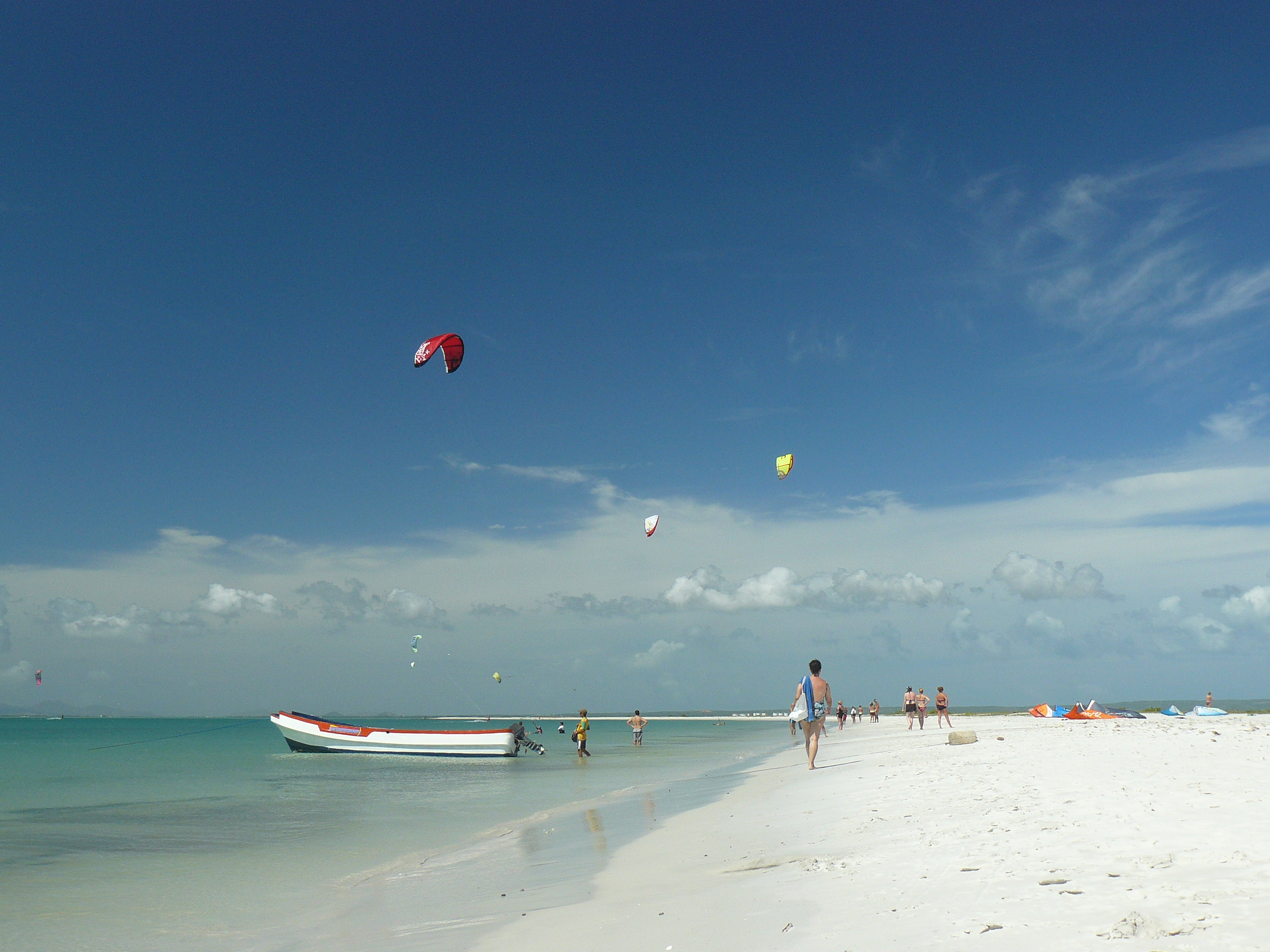
- A beach of the island

- Location within Lesser Antilles Location within Venezuela

Geography
- Location: Caribbean Sea
- Coordinates: 10°46′38″N 63°55′52″W
- Area: 61 km^{2} (24 sq mi)
- Length: 11 km (6.8 mi)
- Width: 6 km (3.7 mi)
- Highest elevation: 28 m (92 ft)

Administration
- Venezuela
- State: Nueva Esparta State
- Municipality: Villalba
- Largest settlement: San Pedro de Coche

Demographics
- Population: 8,756 (2010)

Coche Island (Spanish: Isla de Coche) is one of three islands forming the Nueva Esparta State of Venezuela, located in the Caribbean between Isla Margarita and the mainland. The other two islands are Isla Margarita, the main island of the state, and Cubagua, the smallest. Coche is coterminous with the municipality of Villalba, with the municipal seat at San Pedro de Coche, the largest town. Moreover, Coche Island has continued to sustain the fishing tradition.

It covers an area of 55 km^{2} (21 sq mi) (11 km (7 mi) long by 6 km (4 mi)), with a population of about 8,200 (1999 census). The highest elevation of the island is 60 metres (197 ft) above sea level. The climate is tropical, with an average temperature of approximately 27 to 38 °C (81 to 100 °F).

Other towns on Coche besides San Pedro de Coche are El Bichar, Guinima, El Amparo, El Guamache, and La Uva. The economy depends mainly on tourism.

== History ==
The island was encountered in 1498 by Christopher Columbus. First efforts to settle Coche were made in the early 16th century. There was a previous population of refugees originating from the city of Nueva Cádiz which was destroyed by a tropical storm on Cubagua Island. All settlers, mostly the pearl daughters, abandoned Isla Coche in 1574.

The next settlement took place in the 19th century, and from this date Coche is still inhabited.

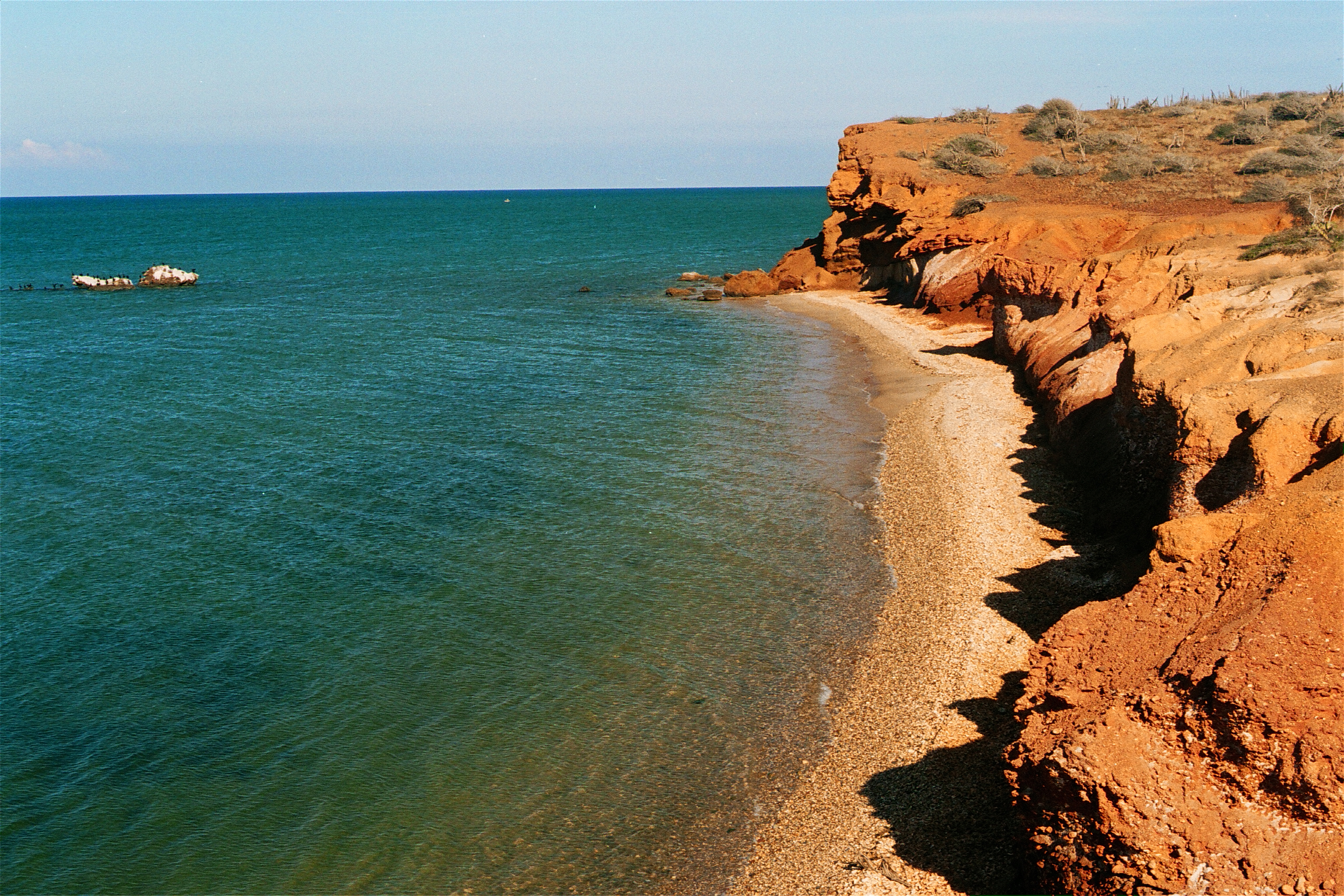
El Amor Beach, Coche Island

The island is contained as the municipality of Villalba, with both having San Pedro de Coche as their capital.

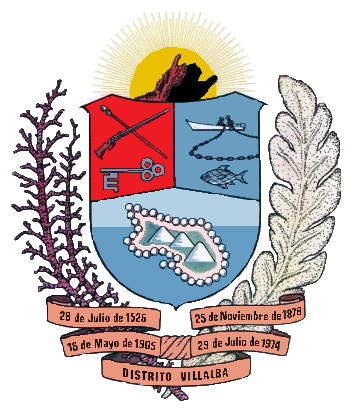
Coat of arms of Villalba

== Airport ==
Andrés Miguel Salazar Marcano Airport serves the island.

== Tourism ==
There are a number of hotels on the island, and both aquatic and terrestrial tours are operated for tourists. For the purposes of tourism, Coche Island maintains close communication with Margarita Island and the Venezuelan mainland Sucre State.

== In fiction ==
The story of the Polish writer Arkady Fiedler's novel "Robinson's Island" (Wyspa Robinsona, 1954) took place in Coche Island. The protagonist Jan (John) Bober, a half-Polish half-English Virginia pioneer, fled from government pursuit by a pirate ship. However it ran into heavy water and wrecked near the island. Jan and his two Arawak companions Arnak and Wagura (former slaves from the ship), the only survivors of the shipwreck, lived in 1725–1726 in the island. Later they received in the island a group of fled slaves from Margarita Island and with combined forces defeated Spanish slaver pursuers and seized their ship. Fearing Spanish revenge, Jan and his followers left the island on the captured ship. Their adventures continued in the two next Arkady Fiedler's novels "Orinoco" (Orinoko, 1957) and "The White Jaguar" (Biały Jaguar, 1980).
