= INo Mobile =

iNo Mobile is a Singapore based mobile phone company that designs, develops and markets mobile phones for niche markets. iNo Mobile is a subsidiary company of Foresight Manufacture (S) Pte Ltd. Their mobile phones are primarily targeted at the elderly, the children of the elderly, namely, the ageing population. The company's key activities include Research and Development, System Integration and the manufacturing of mobile phones targeted mainly at the silver hair group. Its annual turnover was S$7.2 million for the financial year ending 2009.

== Founder ==
Kenneth Lau is the founder of Foresight Manufacture (S) Pte Ltd, trademark owner of "iNO" and internationally recognized as Singapore's pioneer manufacturer and leader of technology and mobile phone solutions that caters to the silver hair community.

== History ==
iNo Mobile first entered the mobile phone market in 2008 with the primary purpose of serving the elderly market, which was non-existent at that time. iNo's first product, the iNo CP09, was launched in 2009 and was a huge success. Sales revenue reached a few million dollars within a few months and was featured on both local and international press. Their success was attributed greatly to their in-depth understanding of the real needs of the elderly market and addressing these needs adequately.

== Products ==
iNO managed to address the needs of men who are serving National Service (NS) in Singapore as well. Until 2012, it was a requirement that mobile phones brought into the camp must not have camera function. Hence, iNo's phones met this requirement and was popular among NS men. However, from 1 September 2012, camera mobile phones will be permitted within 14 Singapore Armed Forces (SAF) camps, which was subsequently increased to include more camps on 1 September 2013. As a result, iNO has been losing market share in the NS men market since camera-equipped mobile devices were permitted in SAF camps. Since the COVID-19 pandemic, Red Zones and Green Zones are merged into "No Unauthorised Photography and Filming" sign as gazetted under the Infrastructure Protection Act; non-camera phones lost its function and were scrapped in 2024.

iNo Mobile launched iNo ONE, the world's first non-camera smartphone in 2012, catering to the small group of people that works in sensitive environment where image capturing devices are strictly not allowed. The iNo Mobile was approved by the Singapore military for use in sensitive areas.

== Future and Overseas Markets ==
Going Forward

iNo Mobile will continue to focus on serving niche markets which are under-served. This resonates well with iNo's motto "爱的深诺", meaning true love in English, as they continue to care for and understand the needs of the overlooked markets and develop products for these markets accordingly.

=== Major customers of iNo Mobile ===
1. Malaysia
  - Out of the 13 states of Malaysia, 7 of them (namely Johor, Malacca, Sabah and Sarawak) distribute the iNo Mobile. Similar to Singapore's National Service regulations, National Service of Malaysia also discourage their soldiers and recruits in bringing phones with camera function into their bunks and camps due to security concerns.
2. Taiwan
  - One of their resellers is 'Yan Do Inc. 盈多有限公司'.
3. Kuwait
  - Situated in Al-Mangaf, a suburb in Kuwait City, in Al-Azizya Commercial Complex.
