= Nueva Cádiz =

Former human settlement in Venezuela

Coordinates: 10°49′26″N 64°10′00″W

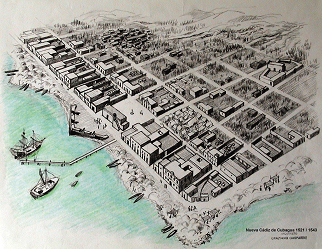
Nueva Cádiz, 1523

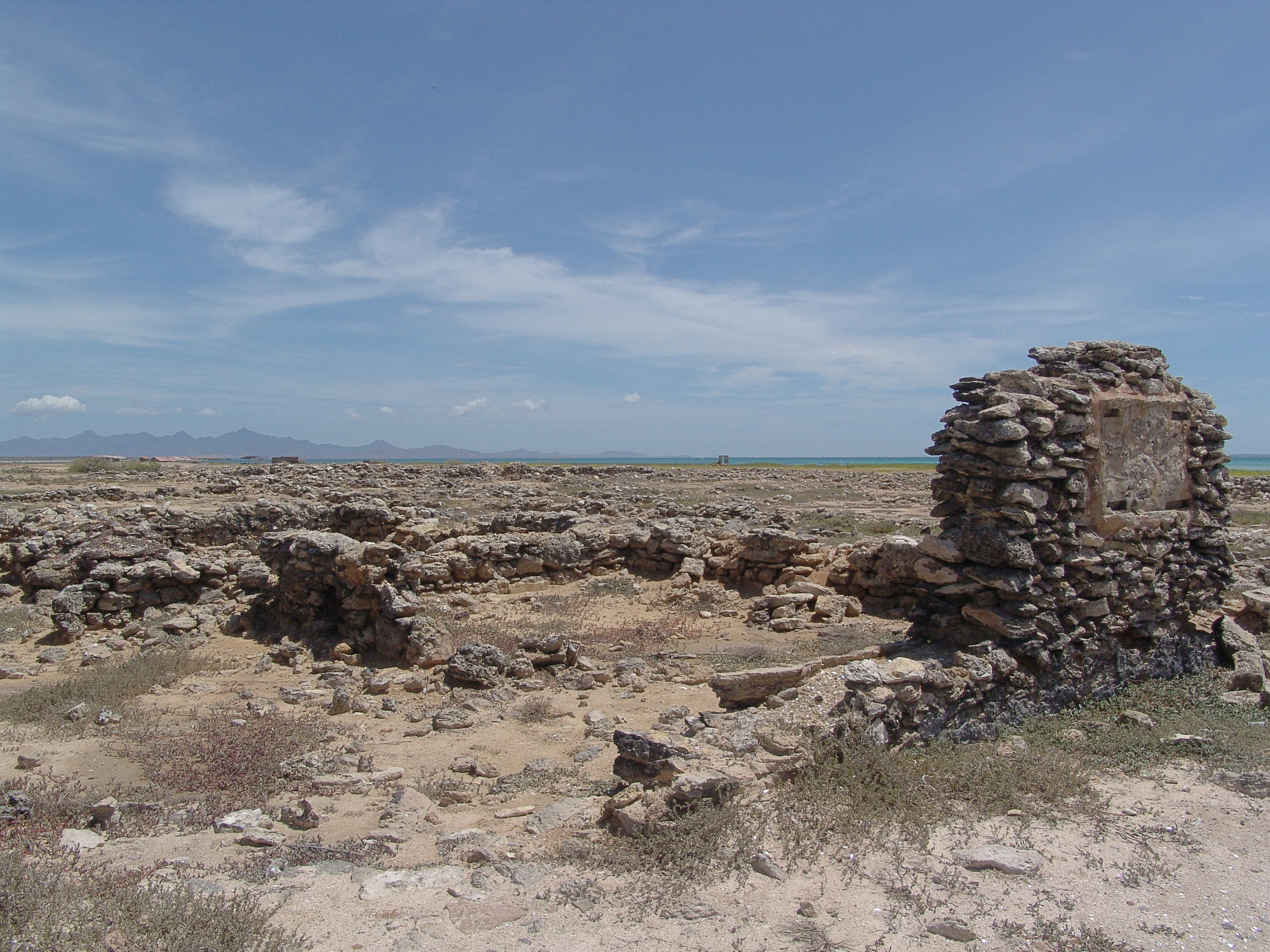
Ruins of Nueva Cádiz

Nueva Cádiz is an archaeological site and former port town on Cubagua, off the coast of Venezuela. First established in 1500 as a seasonal settlement, by 1515 it had become a year-round permanent town. it was one of the first European settlements in the Americas. The settlement was given the name Nueva Cádiz when it was incorporated as a city in 1528.

== History ==
As early as 1502, rancherías were established on Cubagua, occupied for 3–4 months each year during trading. The island was of particular interest because of its rich pearl oyster beds. Eventually, the settlement became permanent and, by 1520, after the great Indian uprising, its resident population surpassed 300. On September 12, 1528 by a royal decree issued by Charles V, Nueva Cádiz was incorporated and became a city named Nueva Cádiz. It became the first Spanish town in South America.

By 1530 Nueva Cádiz had a population of 223 Europeans and 700 natives. At its peak (around 1535), it had over 1500 people. The depletion of the pearl oyster beds, however, became increasingly acute, causing the Spaniards to limit pearl production. In combination with the discovery of new pearl oyster beds on the Guajira Peninsula, this led to a decline of Nueva Cádiz. By 1539 there were less than 50 people left on Cubagua. After a hurricane destroyed the remaining buildings in 1541, the colony was completely abandoned.

The ruins, which are partly submerged beneath the sea, were declared a National Monument of Venezuela in 1979. In the 1950s and 1960s the area was examined by José María Cruxent who published works such as Nueva Cádiz, testimonio de piedra (1955) and Cubagua y el poblamiento oriental de Venezuela en las comienzos (1961) on Nueva Cádiz. The Museo de Nueva Cádiz in La Asunción contains relics unearthed at this site.

== In popular culture ==
In 2015 Venezuelan director Jorge Thielen Armand made a short documentary about the ruins of Nueva Cádiz and the island of Cubagua, Flor de la Mar.

== See also ==
- La Isabela
- Roanoke Colony
