= Cubagua Island =

Island of Nueva Esparta, Venezuela

Native name: Isla de Cubagua
- Map of Cubagua Island

- Cubagua Island within Nueva Esparta

Geography
- Location: Caribbean Sea
- Coordinates: 10°48′42″N 64°11′35″W
- Archipelago: Nueva Esparta
- Highest elevation: 29 m (95 ft)

Administration
- Venezuela
- Region: Insular
- State: Nueva Esparta
- Municipality: Tubores

Demographics
- Demonym: Cubaguense

Cubagua Island or Isla de Cubagua (Spanish pronunciation: [ˈisla ðe kuˈβaɣwa]) is the smallest and least populated of the three islands constituting the Venezuelan state of Nueva Esparta, after Margarita Island and Coche Island. It is located 16 kilometres (10 mi) north of the Araya Peninsula, the closest mainland area.

== Geography ==
=== Topography ===
The island is 9.2 by 3.6 km (5.7 by 2.2 mi) in size, an elliptical shape with the longer axis east-west. Its area is 22.438 km^{2} (9 sq mi). The coast consists of some beaches as well as cliffs from 5 to 7 metres (16 to 23 ft) high in the south and from 20 to 24 metres (66 to 79 ft) high in the north. The highest elevation of the flat-topped island reaches 32 metres (105 ft).

=== Climate ===
It is dry and lacks surface water bodies (the only freshwater is found in small underground reservoirs). Annual precipitation is 250 millimetres (10 inches), which is the value of a dry desert. Temperatures are close to 25 °C (77 °F) year-round with little fluctuation.

=== Vegetation ===
The desert-like (xerophytic) vegetation of the essentially barren island includes a number of cactus species such as Cardón de Dato (Ritterocereus griseus), Buche, Melón de Cerro, Sabana o Monte (Melocactus caesius), Guamacho (Pereskia guamacho), and Opuntia tuna as well as a few legumes (family Fabaceae) such as Mesquite (Prosopis juliflora), Divi-divi (Caesalpinia coriaria), Poorman's Friend (Stylosanthes viscosa), and the Sangre Drago (Croton flavens).

=== Fauna ===
The island has small populations of hares, feral goats and a large population of dogs.

=== Transportation ===
The island of Cubagua has no streets or roads. It is served by ferries and other boats from Punta de Piedras, the capital of the municipality of Tubores located 8 km (5 mi) to the northeast on Isla Margarita. The passage takes less than 2 hours. The boat landing pier is located at the eastern end of Playa Charagato, the main settlement of Cubagua.

A lighthouse marking Punta Charagato lies in the northeast to aid the Isla Margarita ferry and another lighthouse is situated at Punta Brasil in the northwest to aid the ferries of Punta de Piedras and Puerto la Cruz.

== History ==
The first human settlement on Cubagua has been dated to 2325 BC, a time within the Meso-Indian Period (5000-1000 BC).

In 1498, Cubagua was sighted by Christopher Columbus along with Margarita island. Later in 1499 Spanish expeditions returned to exploit abundant pearl oysters, enslaving the indigenous people and harvesting the pearls intensively. They became one of the most valuable resources of the incipient Spanish Empire in the Americas since 1501 but by 1513 the local indigenous population had been devastated. When it was realized that the Lucayan people of Bahamas were practiced at diving for conchs the Spanish sent some of them to Cubagua as pearl divers. Within two years the southern Bahamas were largely depopulated. The Spanish may have carried away as many as 40,000 Lucayans by 1513. The first enslaved Africans arrived in Cubagua between 1526 and 1527 to work in pearl fishing. In 1528, Cristóbal Guerra founded the city of Nueva Cádiz, the first settlement to hold the title of "city" in Venezuela. The city which reached a population between 1,000 and 1,500, became a synonym for the suppression by the Hispanic Conquistadores in South America. By 1531 the depletion of the pearl oyster beds, however, became increasingly acute, causing the Spaniards to limit pearl production. In combination with the discovery of new pearl oyster beds on the Guajira Peninsula, this led to a decline of Nueva Cádiz. By 1539 there were less than 50 people left on Cubagua. Nueva Cádiz was destroyed in an earthquake followed by a tsunami in 1541.

The complete exhaustion of the pearl oyster beds of Cubagua in 1857 determined the definitive abandonment of this island and from then on it would be visited by fishermen who would improvise ranches. The ruins have been declared a National Monument of Venezuela in 1979.

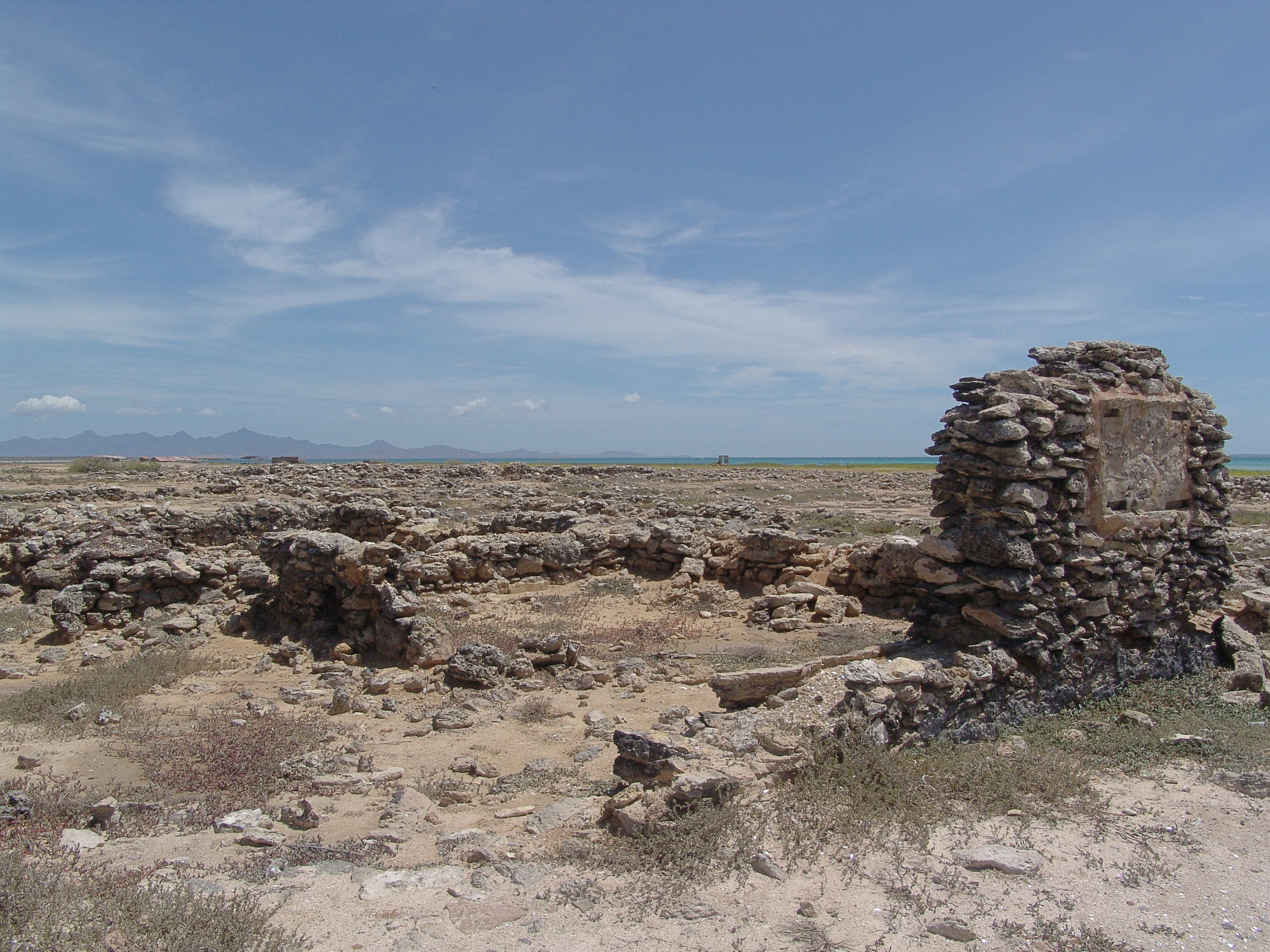
Ruins of Nueva Cádiz

== Administration ==
Cubagua is part of the municipality of Tubores, one of 11 municipalities of the state of Nueva Esparta.

== Population ==
Human activity dates from the 24th century BC, but the first people did not settle here in a permanent fashion. Instead the island was used as a source of oysters, for food, and for pearls. The lack of vegetation or fresh water made permanent settlement nearly impossible. Today the island still has temporary fisherman, but few to no permanent residents.

According to an unofficial population census conducted by the Instituto del Patrimonio Cultural in August 2007, the island had 51 residents of which 19 were children. The population resides in the following 4 communities in the island's northwest:

- Playa Falucho
- Playa Charagato (the largest settlement)
- Punta Charagato
- Punta la Cabecera (close to the ruins Nueva Cádiz)

In addition, on some maps a settlement called Punta Arenas appears in the Southwest. Satellite images reveal about 5 buildings at that site. A small settlement of about 4 buildings can be made out about midway between Punta La Horca (the westernmost point of Cubagua) and Punta Arenas south of Punta El Lamparo. A pair of buildings can be seen on the southern bay of Manglecito just east of Punta Manglecito.

The population exceeds 300 during the year when seasonal fishermen from the Venezuelan mainland state of Sucre are included.

== In popular culture ==
In 2015, Venezuelan director Jorge Thielen Armand made a short documentary about the island of Cubagua, Flor de la Mar.

== See also ==
- Cariaco Basin
