= Kilaguni =

- Location in Kenya; Placement on map is approximate
- Coordinates: 02°54′00″S 38°04′12″E
- Country: Kenya
- County: Taita-Taveta County
- Elevation: 2,750 ft (840 m)

Kilaguni is a location in Kenya.

== Location ==
Kilaguni is a location in Tsavo West National Park, Taita-Taveta County, in southeastern Kenya, close to the International border with the Republic of Tanzania.

It lies approximately 100 kilometres (62 mi), by road, northwest of Voi, the nearest large town, on the Mombasa-Nairobi Highway. Kilaguni's location is approximately 275 kilometres (171 mi), by road, northwest of the coastal city of Mombasa, the nearest large city.

== Overview ==
Kilaguni sits at an elevation of 2,750 feet (840 m) above sea level. It is the location of Kilaguni Lodge, a private hospitality establishment. A road from here (C103-West) leads west to the town of Oloitokitok, at the border with Tanzania, approximately 77 kilometres (48 mi) from Kilaguni. The same road (C103-East) leads east to the town of Tsavo, along the Mombasa-Nairobi Highway, approximately 60 kilometres (37 mi) east of Kilaguni. The location is also served by Kilaguni Airport.

== Population ==
The entire Tsavo West National Park, where Kilaguni is located, had a total human population of 2,733 according to the 1999 Kenya National Census conducted that year. No further details are available about the population of Kilaguni.

== See also ==
- Kilaguni Airport
- Tsavo West National Park
