= Kilaguni Airport =

- IATA: ILU; ICAO: HKKL

Summary
- Airport type: Public, Civilian
- Owner: Kenya Airports Authority
- Serves: Kilaguni, Kenya
- Location: Kilaguni, Kenya
- Elevation AMSL: 2,750 ft / 840 m
- Coordinates: 02°54′00″S 38°04′26″E

Map
- Location of Kilaguni Airport in Kenya; Placement on map is approximate

Runways
Direction	Length		Surface
Direction	ft	m	Surface
01/19	5,200	1,600	Unpaved
12/30	5,200	1,600	Unpaved

Kilaguni Airport is an airport in Kenya.

== Location ==
The airport, (IATA: ILU, ICAO: HKKL) is located in Kilaguni, Taita-Taveta County inside Tsavo West National Park, in southeastern Kenya, close to the International border with the Republic of Tanzania.

Its location is approximately 217 kilometres (135 mi), by air, southeast of Nairobi International Airport, the country's largest civilian airport. The geographic coordinates of this airport are:2° 54' 0.00"N, 38° 4' 26.00"E (Latitude:-2.900000; Longitude:38.073889).

== Overview ==
Kilaguni Airport is a small airport that serves the location of Kilaguni and the adjacent areas of Tsavo National Park. Situated at 2,750 feet (840 m) above sea level, the airport has two unpaved runways, each 5,200 feet (1,600 m) long.

== Airlines and destinations ==
Airlines	Destinations
Safarilink	Amboseli, Nairobi–Wilson

== See also ==
- Kenya Airports Authority
- Kenya Civil Aviation Authority
- List of airports in Kenya
