= Inongo Airport =

- IATA: INO; ICAO: FZBA

Summary
- Airport type: Public
- Location: Inongo
- Elevation AMSL: 1,040 ft / 317 m
- Coordinates: 1°56′50″S 18°17′09″E

Map
- Location within DRC

Runways
Direction	Length		Surface
Direction	m	ft	Surface
08/26	1,200	3,937	Dirt
- Source: GCM Google Maps

Inongo Airport (IATA: INO, ICAO: FZBA) is an airstrip serving Inongo, a city on the eastern shore of Lake Mai-Ndombe in Mai-Ndombe Province, Democratic Republic of Congo.

The Inongo non-directional beacon (Ident: INO) is 0.7 nautical miles (1.3 km) west-southwest of the airstrip.

== See also ==
- Transport in the Democratic Republic of the Congo
- List of airports in the Democratic Republic of the Congo
