= Chigorodó =

- Municipality and town
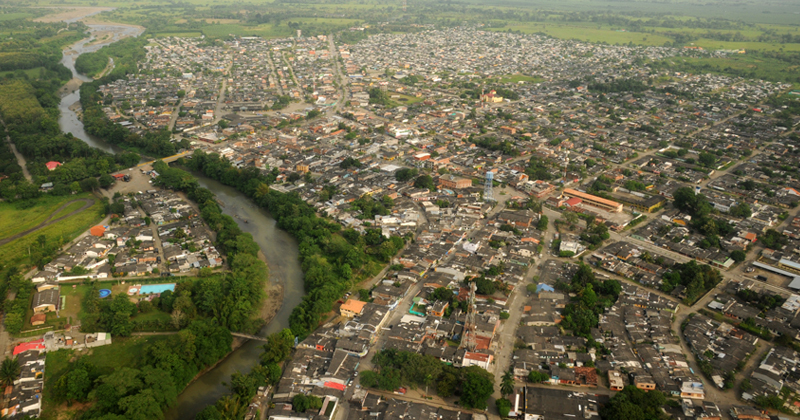

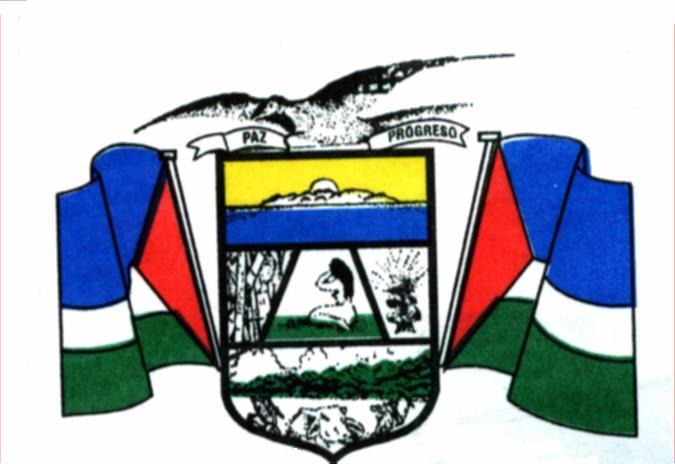
- Flag Coat of arms

- Location of the municipality and town of Chigorodó in the Antioquia Department of Colombia
- Coordinates: 7°40′N 76°41′W
- Country: Colombia
- Department: Antioquia Department
- Subregion: Urabá
- Founded: 1878

Government
  - Mayor: Daniel Alvarez Sosa

Area
  - Municipality and town: 608 km^{2} (235 sq mi)
  - Urban: 3.56 km^{2} (1.37 sq mi)
- Elevation: 34 m (112 ft)

Population (2020 est.)
  - Municipality and town: 86,239
  - Density: 142/km^{2} (367/sq mi)
  - Urban: 50,581
  - Urban density: 14,200/km^{2} (36,800/sq mi)
- Demonym: Chigorodoseños
- Time zone: UTC-5 (Colombia Standard Time)
- Area code: 57 + 4
- Website: Official website (in Spanish)

Chigorodó (Spanish pronunciation: [tʃiɣoɾoˈðo]) is a town and municipality in Antioquia Department, Colombia. It is part of the Urabá Antioquia sub-region.

== Transportation ==
It is served by the Jaime Ortiz Betancur Airport, which once had commercial air service to Medellin on ACES Colombia Airlines during the early 1990s.

== Residents ==
- Jaime Castañeda, cyclist

== Climate ==
Chigorodó has a tropical rainforest climate (Af) with heavy to very heavy rainfall year-round.

Climate data for Chigorodó (Palmera La), elevation 58 m (190 ft), (1981–2010)
Month	Jan	Feb	Mar	Apr	May	Jun	Jul	Aug	Sep	Oct	Nov	Dec	Year
Mean daily maximum °C (°F)	31.2 (88.2)	31.7 (89.1)	32.0 (89.6)	31.4 (88.5)	31.3 (88.3)	31.1 (88.0)	31.0 (87.8)	31.0 (87.8)	31.0 (87.8)	30.9 (87.6)	30.5 (86.9)	30.7 (87.3)	31.2 (88.2)
Daily mean °C (°F)	27.2 (81.0)	27.7 (81.9)	27.8 (82.0)	27.6 (81.7)	27.4 (81.3)	27.3 (81.1)	27.1 (80.8)	27.2 (81.0)	27.1 (80.8)	27.1 (80.8)	27.0 (80.6)	27.0 (80.6)	27.3 (81.1)
Mean daily minimum °C (°F)	22.3 (72.1)	22.2 (72.0)	22.9 (73.2)	22.9 (73.2)	22.9 (73.2)	22.7 (72.9)	22.4 (72.3)	22.4 (72.3)	22.1 (71.8)	22.2 (72.0)	22.4 (72.3)	22.6 (72.7)	22.5 (72.5)
Average precipitation mm (inches)	142.2 (5.60)	87.5 (3.44)	120.6 (4.75)	270.7 (10.66)	427.9 (16.85)	449.2 (17.69)	396.5 (15.61)	414.3 (16.31)	443.6 (17.46)	455.1 (17.92)	363.2 (14.30)	313.9 (12.36)	3,803.9 (149.76)
Average precipitation days (≥ 1.0 mm)	9	7	9	16	20	23	24	23	23	23	21	16	201
Average relative humidity (%)	81	78	78	82	83	83	83	84	84	84	83	84	82
Mean monthly sunshine hours	105.4	107.3	65.1	81.0	74.4	75.0	80.6	96.1	81.0	105.4	90.0	86.8	1,048.1
Mean daily sunshine hours	3.4	3.8	2.1	2.7	2.4	2.5	2.6	3.1	2.7	3.4	3.0	2.8	2.9
Source: Instituto de Hidrologia Meteorologia y Estudios Ambientales
