= Nordicphotos =

Swedish collective photo agency

- Type: Stock photography
- Founded: 2000
- Headquarters: Reykjavík, Iceland, Iceland

NordicPhotos is a collection of seven Nordic image collections, Tiofoto, Mira, Greatshots, IMS, Siluet, Nordic and the royalty free collection, Simply North. Together it is one of the largest image collections of Nordic imagery, with over 5 million images and 300 photographers.

== History ==
NordicPhotos was founded in 2000 by Arnaldur Gauti Johnson, Kjartan Dagbjartsson, Hreinn Ágústsson and Thor Ólafsson with funding from The Icelandic New Business Venture Fund. In 2003 the company started expanding and has for the past years, strengthened its foundation when acquiring some of the most well known and respected picture agencies in Sweden, with a history dating back more than 60 years. Today NordicPhotos has established itself as one of the leading picture agencies in the Nordic countries.

NordicPhotos has offices in Reykjavík, Iceland, Stockholm, Sweden and Oslo, Norway and represents many image collections in the Nordic countries.

== Acquisitions ==
- Year 2003 IMS Bildbyrå, Sweden (founded 1946)
- Year 2003 Mira Bildarkiv, Sweden (founded 1978)
- Year 2004 Tiofoto, Sweden (founded 1958)
- Year 2006 Greatshots, Sweden (founded 1992)
- Year 2007 GV-Press, Norway (founded 1988)
- Year 2008 Spegla, Sweden (founded 2006)
- Year 2014 Gagnvirki, Iceland

== Photographers represented by NordicPhotos ==
- Hans Hammarskiöld
- Lennart Olsson
- Georg Oddner
- Anders Petersen
- Sten Didrik Bellander
- Harry Dittmer
- Sven Gillsäter
- Rune Hassner
- Tore Johnson
- Hans Malmberg
- Pål-Nils Nilsson
- Micke Berg
- Nina Korhonen
- Thorbjörn Larsson
- Tina Miguel
- Conny Ekström
- Theresia Bråkenhielm
- Moa Karlberg
- Richard Yngwe

== See also ==
- Stock photography
