= Mikrut =

Mikrut is a Polish surname. Notable people with the surname include:

- Dariusz Mikrut (born 1979), Polish chess master
- Karol Mikrut (born 1992), Polish luger
- Luka Mikrut (born 2004), Croatian tennis player
- Jack Mikrut Poland born Swedish photographer
