= Karol Pinkas =

Polish chess player (1950–2023)

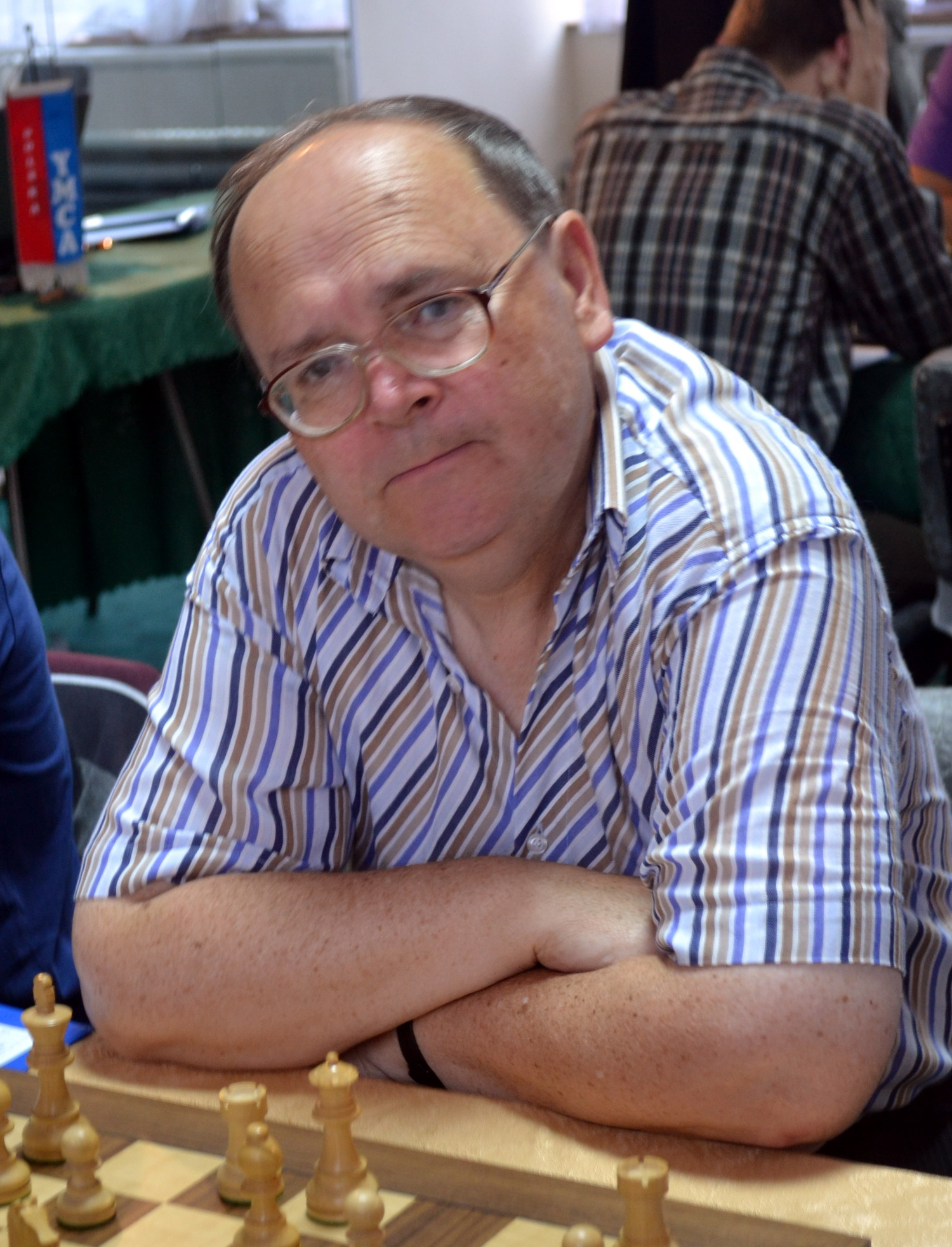
- Pinkas in 2011

Personal information
- Born: 13 February 1950 Wisła, Poland
- Died: 7 June 2023 (aged 73) Wisła, Poland

Chess career
- Country: Poland
- Title: International Master (1986)
- Peak rating: 2405 (January 1983)

Karol Pinkas (13 February 1950 – 7 June 2023) was a Polish chess International Master (1986).

== Chess career ==
In 1973 Karol Pinkas appeared for the first time in the finals of Polish Chess Championship, taking 12th place in Gdynia. Until 1993, he appeared in the final tournaments nine times, achieving the best result in 1977 in Piotrków Trybunalski then he took the 6th place. From the mid-1970s Karol Pinkas began to be successful in national chess tournaments. In 1976 he shared the 1st place in the Swiss-system tournament in Świeradów-Zdrój (among others with Krzysztof Pytel and Zbigniew Szymczak) and took 2nd place in the international chess tournament in Katowice. In 1980, Karol Pinkas was 2nd in Białystok and 2nd in the "open" in Wrocław. In 1981, he single-handedly won the next open tournament in Świeradów-Zdrój (before Zbigniew Jaśnikowski). In 1982 Karol Pinkas won in Puck and was 2nd in Słupsk, while in 1985 he won in Mysłowice and shared 2nd place (together with, among others, Jan Przewoźnik and Jacek Bielczyk) in Katowice (in both of these tournaments he fulfilled the norm for the title of chess International Master). In 1993 in Katowice he played games with listeners of Polskie Radio. In 2002, Karol Pinkas shared the 1st place in Jaworzno, and the next year he won in this city. In 2005 he took second place (behind Dariusz Mikrut) in Chrzanów.

Karol Pinkas competed many times in the Polish Blitz Chess Championships, achieving the greatest success in 1989 in Miętne, where he won the silver medal. Also he won three medals in Polish Team Chess Championship: 2 silver (1973, 1975) and bronze (1976).

Karol Pinkas reached his career highest rating on 1 January 1983, with a score of 2405 points, he was ranked 9th-10th place among Polish chess players.

In addition to good results in tournament play, Karol Pinkas was also successful in Correspondence chess, winning in 1978 the Polish Correspondence Chess Championship. On the rating ICCF list in October 2006 he had 2383 points.

Pinkas was the co-author of the book Śląskie Ciekawostki Szachowe (Silesian Chess Curiosities) presenting chess in Silesia in two languages: Silesian and Polish.

== Death ==
Pinkas died in Wisła on 7 June 2023, at the age of 73.
