= Tio fotografer =

Twentieth-century Swedish photography collective

Tio fotografer (English: 'Ten photographers'), also known as Tiofoto, was a Swedish photography collective founded on 10 October 1958 in Stockholm.

== History ==
Pictorialism as practiced in photography club competitions and exhibitions promoted a romantic national pride during the Second World War in neutral Sweden. Post-war, the country's young photographers reacted against the painterly pretensions of such practitioners whom they derisively nicknamed 'Rosenlunderiet' after an old peoples' home in Stockholm.

In 1949 some of the young photographers, dubbed "De Unga" (The Young), who were to form Tio fotografer participated in an exhibition organised by editor of FOTO magazine Lars Wickman. It was an open provocation of the conservative photographic establishment.

The majority of the exhibitors returned to their specialities in fashion, journalism, nature photography, and so on, while the second-youngest, Rune Hassner, took up the cause of the young radicals, writing polemics in the trade journals.

In 1949 Stockholm's 'Young Photographers' Rune Hassner, Tore Johnsson, Sven Gillsater, Hans Hammarskiold and others saw themselves developing a new 'international language of photography.' They were amongst many Scandinavian photographers of the post-war period to seek opportunities elsewhere in Europe. Tore Johnsson and Rune Hassner, went to Paris. When New York replaced Paris as the desirable destination for upcoming photographers in the 1960s Lennart Nilsson began there, before turning to scientific photography. Over the next decade members met occasionally and informally, in London, Cuba, New York or Hong Kong, and the idea of a photographic cooperative developed.

At a reunion on 10 October 1958 in Stockholm the ten photographers, who in the meantime had traveled and developed their careers, founded the collective Tio fotografer ('Ten photographers'). Ten years after their initial exhibition, the group formed their agency Tiofoto. The co-operative shared office, studio, and darkroom facilities in Stockholm, but otherwise remained independent in style and approach.

== Members ==
- Sten Didrik Bellander (1921–2001)
- Harry Dittmer (1910–2000)
- Sven Gillsäter (1921–2001)
- Rune Hassner (1928–2003)
- Georg Oddner (1923–2007)
- Lennart Olson (1925–2010)
- Hans Hammarskiöld (1925–2012)
- Tore Johnson (1928–1980)
- Hans Malmberg (1927–1977)
- Pål Nils Nilsson (1929–2002)

By the 1980s, to the ten founding members were added fifty new members.

== Activity ==
Tio's activities started with exhibitions: Lund in 1958, then Tio fotografer pa Svensk Form in Stockholm in 1960. Since then Tio had exhibitions in Sweden and abroad and its members have exhibited in Sweden and abroad on an individual basis.

Initially, the main concern of the members of Tio was the field of photojournalism and illustration and most of its members worked as magazine photographers, with some specializing in fashion, wild life, advertising or architecture. From 1965, television was making inroads on the audience for pictorial magazines.Ten years after its formation and without any formal decision, Tio changed its scope; seven of the 10 worked almost full-time work for television, cinema or audiovisual productions. Consequently, the stock sales department, Tiofoto expanded to include a dozen other free-lance photographers and included their material in the files, which by that stage held 200,000 photographic prints, about a million negatives, and a growing file of colour transparencies. Members of the group also made documentary films and television films, totalling, by the 1980s, more than 150 films and television programs, as well as feature films.

The group was influential in Swedish photography and they regularly exhibited at significant venues for photography. A US Library of Congress exhibition toured America during 1971–2, and the whole group was presented at the Hasselblad Centre in 1998.

Others dealt with teaching, conferences, research, and audio-visual production. Several also published many books. Pål-Nils Nilsson, Hans Hammarskiöld, Rune Hassner, Georg Oddner and Lennart Olson held prominent positions in the educational and institutional spheres and they regularly exhibited at significant venues for photography, and in 1998, the year Nilsson became a professor of photography at the Fothögskolan in Gothenburg, the whole group was presented at the Hasselblad Centre founded by Rune Hassner

== Legacy ==
An agency NordicPhotos founded in 2000 by Arnaldur Gauti Johnson, Kjartan Dagbjartsson, Hreinn Ágústsson and Thor Ólafsson, preserves and represents the Tiofoto archive alongside Mira, Greatshots, IMS, Siluet, Nordic and the royalty free collection, Simply North.

== Exhibitions ==
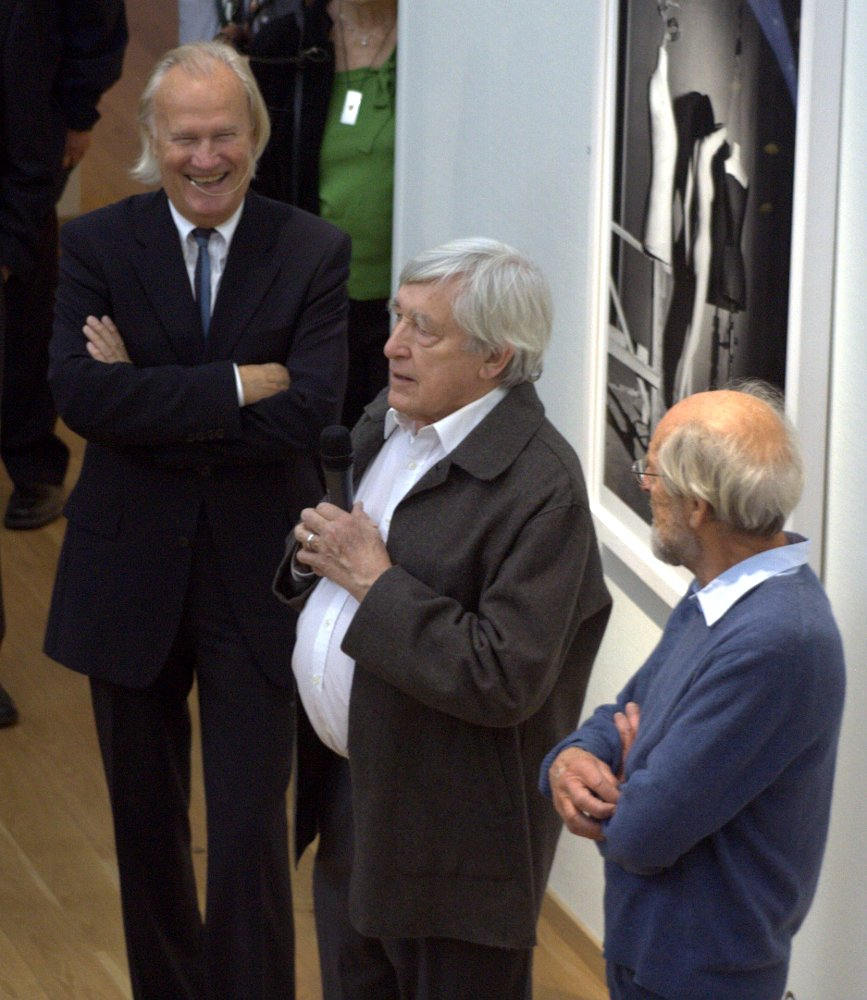
Picture of (from left to right); Hasse Persson; director of the Borås art museum, Hans Hammarskiöld; photographer, Lennart Olson; photographer. Taken at the Tio fotografer exhibition in Borås 2009.

- 1949: Unga Fotografer, Rotohallen, Stockholm
- 1951: Jeunes Photographes Suedois, Kodak Gallery, Paris
- 1960: Tio fotografer pa Svensk Form, Stockholm
- 1971-2: Contemporary Photographs From Sweden. US Library of Congress touring exhibition
- 1976: Tio fotografer, Gal. Aronowitsch, Stockholm
- 1977: Tio fotografer, Rencontres Internationales de Photographie, Arles (travelled to La Photogalerie, Paris)
- 1982: 11 Fotografos Suecos, Consejo Mexicano de Fotografia, México
- 2010, from 4 April: Ten Photographers: Sten Didrik Bellander, Harry Dittmer, Sven Gillsater, Hans Hammarskjöld, Rune Hassner, Tore Yngve Johnson, Hans Malmberg, Pal-Nils Nilsson, Georg Oddner, Lennart Olson. The Eighth International Photography Month in Moscow: Photobiennale 2010, State Museum of Contemporary Art, Gogolevsky boulevard,10, Moscow
- 2010, 10 November–23 January 2011: Tio Fotografiska: The Collective. Institut suédois, 11 rue Payenne, 75003 Paris

== Collections ==
- IMP/GEH, Rochester, USA
- MOMA, New York, USA
- Musée d'Art moderne suédois, Stockholm, Sweden
- Musée municipal de Stockholm, Sweden
- Musée national suédois des Beaux-Arts, Stockholm, Sweden
