= IMS =

IMS may refer to:

== Organizations ==
=== Companies ===
- Integrated Medical Systems International, a former surgical instrument management and clinical consulting company
- Integrated Micro Solutions, a GPU manufacturer
- Intelligent Micro Software, a former developer of Multiuser DOS, REAL/32, and REAL/NG
- IMS Health (ticker symbol NYSE:IMS), a US company providing data services for healthcare
- IMS Associates, Inc., an early computer manufacturer
- IMS Bildbyrå, a Swedish stock photograph agency

=== Institutes ===
- IMS International Medical Services, of the State University Medical Center Freiburg, Germany
- Indian Mathematical Society
- Indian Medical Service, a military medical service in British India
- Indian Missionary Society, an Indian Catholic Religious Institute (Varanasi)
- Insight Meditation Society, a Buddhist organization in Barre, Massachusetts
- Institute of Mathematical Statistics
- International Magicians Society
- International Micropatrological Society
- International Military Staff, the executive body of the NATO Military Committee
- International Monitoring System, a division of the Comprehensive Nuclear-Test-Ban Treaty Organization
- International Mountain Society, for mountain research, Bern, Switzerland
- International Musicological Society, a learned society for musicology in Basel, Switzerland
- Irish Marching Society, Rockford, Illinois, US
- Irish Mathematical Society
- Iranian Mathematical Society

=== Education ===
- IMS Unison University, formerly Institute of Management Studies, India
- Institute of Management Studies, Devi Ahilya University, Devi Ahilya University, India
- Institute of Medical Sciences, Banaras Hindu University, Varanasi, India
- Iowa Mennonite School, former name of Hillcrest Academy, Iowa, US
- Imaduddin School, Malé, Maldives

== Science and technology ==
- Immunomagnetic separation, a laboratory technique
- Indian Mini Satellite bus, Indian Space Research Organisation
- Industrial methylated spirit
- Insulated metal substrate, for power electronics
- Intelligent maintenance system, to predict machine failure
- Intelligent Munitions System, American smart mine
- Intermediate shaft, of a car transmission; see Porsche Intermediate Shaft Bearing issue
- Intermediate syndrome, in organophosphate poisoning
- Intramuscular stimulation or dry needling
- Ion mobility spectrometry
- Irritable male syndrome, an annual behavior in some mammals

=== Computing ===
- IBM Information Management System, a database and information management system
- Internet Map Server, providing maps
- Internet Medieval Sourcebook, a website
- IP Multimedia Subsystem, a framework for delivering services over mobile networks

== Other uses ==
- Indianapolis Motor Speedway, Speedway, Indiana, US
- Integrated master schedule, a US DoD planning tool
- International Measurement System, a handicapping system used in sailboat racing
- International Music Summit, a yearly dance conference held in Ibiza

== See also ==
- Ims, a Norwegian surname
