= Margaret Harker =

British photographer and historian

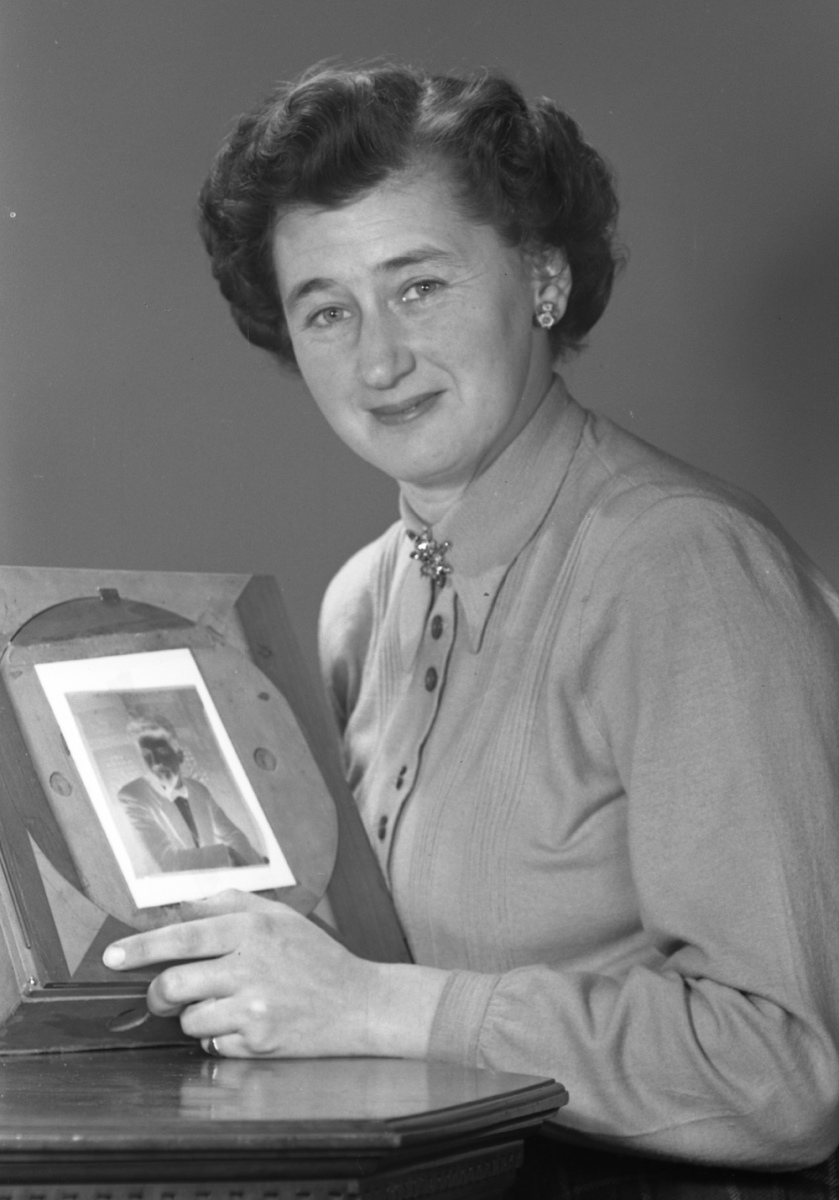
- Harker, 1952
- Born: Margaret Florence Harker; 17 January 1920; Southport, Lancashire, England
- Died: 16 February 2013 (aged 93); Pulborough, West Sussex, England
- Education: Regent Street Polytechnic
- Known for: Architectural photographer, historian and teacher of photography.
- Spouse: Richard Farrand (m. 1972; died 1982)
- Awards: Fellow of the Royal Photographic Society in 1943
- Elected: first woman president of the Royal Photographic Society, 1958 to 1960

Margaret Florence Harker (17 January 1920 – 16 February 2013), was a British photographer and historian of photography. She was the UK's first woman professor of photography, founded the country's first photography degree course, and was the first woman to be president of the Royal Photographic Society.

== Early life ==
Margaret Florence Harker was born on 17 January 1920 at 18 Queens Road, Southport, Lancashire, the daughter of Thomas Henry Harker (1879–1947), a medical practitioner, and his wife, Ethel Dean Harker, née Dyson (1894–1975). She was educated at Howell's School in Denbigh, followed by the Southport School of Art. Her father was a keen amateur photographer, and her parents supported her when from 1940 to 1943, she studied photography at the Regent Street Polytechnic (now the University of Westminster).

== Career ==
Harker started her career an architectural photographer, contributing to the National Buildings Record beginning from its 1941 establishment, and in excess of 1,000 of her negatives are held by its successor body at Historic England.

Harker joined the Royal Photographic Society in 1941, was elected a Fellow in 1943, served on its council from 1951 to 1976, and chaired the applied photographic distinction panel from 1951 until 1992. Harker also became the honorary curator of the society's collection of historic photographs. From 1958 to 1960, Harker was the first woman to be president of the Royal Photographic Society.

In 1943, Harker became a full-time lecturer at Regent Street Polytechnic, and in 1959 became the head of its School of Photography.

Harker started the UK's first degree course in photography at the Polytechnic of Central London. In 1992, when it became the University of Westminster, she was appointed as one of its inaugural first six professors.

Harker was one of the founding members of the European Society for the History of Photography, its Vice President 1978–82, and President 1986–2001. She was editor (1990-1993) of the society's printed journal, PhotoResearcher, published since 1990.

== Publications ==
- Harker, Margaret F. (1950), A Selection of the Pictorial Work of Margaret F. Harker, Royal Photographic Society
- Harker, Margaret F. (1951), Photographing Architecture, Fountain P
- Harker, Margaret F. (1975), Victorian and Edwardian Photographs, Letts & Co., ISBN 978-0-85097-200-9
- Harker, Margaret F.; Royal Photographic Society of Great Britain (1979), The Linked Ring: The Secession Movement in Photography in Britain, 1892-1910, Heinemann, ISBN 978-0-434-31360-0
- Harker, Margaret Florence; Cameron, Julia Margaret Pattle, 1815-1879 (1983), Julia Margaret Cameron, Collins, ISBN 978-0-00-411937-3
- Harker, Margaret Florence; Robinson, H. P. (Henry Peach), 1830-1901 (1988), Henry Peach Robinson: Master of Photographic Art, 1830-1901, B. Blackwell, ISBN 978-0-631-16172-1
- Harker, Margaret F. Henry Peach Robinson: The Grammar of Art. In Weaver, Mike (25 August 1989), British Photography in the Nineteenth Century: The Fine Art Tradition, Cambridge University Press (published 1989), ISBN 978-0-521-34119-6
- Harker, Margaret F. (2000), Photographers of Malta, 1840-1990, Fondazzjoni Patrimonju Malti, ISBN 978-99932-10-03-0

== Collections ==
- Margaret Harker collection in the Historic England Archive
- Photographs attributed to Margaret Harker are held in the Conway Library of art and architecture at The Courtauld.

== Personal life ==
On 20 December 1972, Harker married fellow photographer Richard Farrand (1916–1982).

== Death ==
Harker died on 16 February 2013, of heart failure, after having suffered from dementia, at The Anchorage Care Home in Pulborough, and was buried in the churchyard of St Bartholomew's Church, Egdean.
