= Imms =

Imms is a surname. Notable people with the surname include:

- Augustus Daniel Imms (1880–1949), English educator and entomologist
- David Imms (born 1945), English artist and painter

== See also ==
- Ims
- IMMS, the Institute for Marine Mammal Studies
