= European Society for the History of Photography =

The European Society for the History of Photography (ESHPh), founded in 1978, is a society concerned with the historical events within photography from a European perspective.

The ESHPh publicly hosts symposia, publishes journals, and distributes the "International Letter" to its members. The ESHPh is actively chronicling the historiography of the history of photography in Europe.

== History ==
The founding of the Europäischen Gesellschaft für die Geschichte der Photographie (ESHPh) [European Society for the History of Photography] took place at the first general meeting on 19 November 1978 in Leverkusen, Germany. The decision to form a society of this nature had been taken one year earlier in Antwerp, Belgium. A group of museum curators and photographic historians from six European countries — notably Laurent Roosens (of the Sterckshof Museum, Antwerp), Margaret Harker (the UK's Royal Photographic Society) and Rolf Krauss (German Society for Photography) — came together to establish a new society dealing with the history of photography in a European context.

Since 2001, the presidential headquarters are to be found in Vienna. From 1978 until 1989, those headquarters were in Antwerp; thereafter, until 2001, in Croydon, UK. It is currently based in Vienna, although the website is hosted by the Donau University Krems, Austria.

== The aims of the ESHPh ==
The ESHPh was founded with the primary aim of researching the historical development of photography from its origins up to the present and integrating it within a European context within the social political matrix of photography's inherent interdisciplinary nature. Photographers, general historians and historians of photography, philosophers, sociologists, ethnologists, academics, curators and private collectors as well as many important European institutions and some from further afield all belong to the ESHPh. Alongside its research activities, the ESHPh takes part in a worldwide exchange of information. It supports both the recognition of the history of photography as an academic discipline and the establishment of chairs in the discipline at European universities.

From 1981 until 2004, the society has held symposia in various locations in Europe, as evidenced by diverse publications. For its 30th anniversary in 2008, the ESHPh celebrated an internationally attended photography congress at the Austrian Academy of Sciences, in Vienna, from 6–8 November 2008. This anniversary event was accompanied by an English language commemorative publication and took place as the theoretical focus of the European Month of Photography 2008 in Vienna.

The ESHPh as a society was entered in the Austrian Register of Societies on 3 March 2004. However, the seat of society is connected to the presidency.

The first general meeting, at which the board was elected, took place on 8 June in the WestLicht Gallery in Vienna. The new Executive Committee of the ESHPh was elected at the Society's annual general assembly that was held in Vienna on 4 November 2010, at the invitation of the Department for Pictures at the Austrian National Library.

== Symposia ==
Since 1981, the society has brought together practitioners and specialists with the aim of discussing photography and to create contacts from a variety of disciplines relating to photography.

- 2012 Vienna (A)
  - The Material and Immaterial in Photography
  - 2nd Congress of Photography in Vienna at the MUSA
  - 24 November 2012
  - Felderstraße 6-8, 1010 Vienna
- 2008 Vienna (A) 22nd International Symposium
  - The 30 Years Jubilee of ESHPh
  - 1st Congress of Photography in Vienna at the Austrian Academy of Sciences (Theatre-Hall)
  - 6–8 November 2008
  - Sonnenfelsgasse 19, 1010 Vienna
- 2004 Stockholm (S) 21st International Symposium
  - From Nordic Landscapes to North American Indians Current Trends in Nordic and International History of Photography
  - 9–10 September 2004 at the National Library of Sweden and Moderna Museet, Stockholm
- 2003 Mannheim (D) 20th International Symposium
  - Helmut Gernsheim Reconsidered
  - 12 October 2003 at the Museum of Anthropology and Natural History (Reiss-Engelhorn Museen), Mannheim
- 2002 Maastricht (NL) 19th International Symposium
  - BOXED
  - 11–13 November 2002 at the Academy of Visual Art, Hogeschool Zuyd, Maastricht, Netherlands
- 2001 Vienna (A) 18th International Symposium
  - Photography and Research in Austria – Vienna, the Door to the European East
  - 20–22 June 2001 at the Austrian National Library in Vienna
- 2000 Bradford (UK) 17th International Symposium
  - Retracing the Image: The Emergence of Photography in the Nineteenth Century
  - 16–17 June 2000 at the Museum for Photography, Film & Television, Bradford, UK
- 1999 Udine (I) 16th International Symposium
  - Photography in Italy
  - 5–8 May 1999 at the University of Udine, Italy
- 1998 Antwerpen (B) 15th International Symposium
  - 20 Years of European Society for the History of Photography
  - 8–11 January 1998 at the Congrescentrum‘t Elzenveld, Antwerp, Belgium
- 1997 Helsinki (FIN) 14th International Symposium
  - Finland Shamanism and Beliefs in Europe Photography
  - 9–12 October 1997 at Hanasaari (The Swedish - Finnish Cultural Centre), Helsinki, Finland
- 1997 Brussels (B) 13th International Symposium
  - Photoresearcher ESHPh
  - 18 April 1997 at the Free University Brussels, in collaboration with Higher Institute for Fine Arts and ESHPh Belgium, Brussels, Belgium
  - Essays third symposium 'Image & University' - Philosophy of photography
- 1996 Charleroi (B) 12th International Symposium
  - Questioning the World
  - 25–28 April 1996 at the Museum of Photographie, Charleroi, Belgium
- 1994 Oslo (N) 11th International Symposium
  - 25–28 August 1994 at Lysebu Conference Centre, Oslo, Norway
- 1993 Vilanova (E) 10th International Symposium
  - 28–30 June 1993 at the Town-Hall of Vilanova i la Geltrú, Barcelona, Spain
- 1992 Edinburgh (UK) 9th International Symposium
  - Photography 1900
  - In association of The Scottish Society for the History of Photography
  - 24–26 September 1992 at the National Museum of Scotland, Edinburgh
- 1992 London, (UK) 8th International Symposium
  - The changing Role of Photography in Advertising & Fashion
  - 30 May 1992 at the National Portrait Gallery, London
- 1991 Toulouse (F) 7th International Symposium
  - 27–29 June 1991 at the Galerie du Château d'eau, Toulouse, France
- 1989 Göteborg (SE) 6th International Symposium
  - 28 September – 1 October 1989 at the Department of Design and Crafts, Gothenburg, Sweden
- 1989 Vevey (CH) 5th International Symposium
  - 150th Anniversary of the Invention of Photography
  - 29 June – 2 July 1989 at the Centre Doret, Vevey, Switzerland
- 1988 Antwerpen (B) 4th International Symposium
  - 10 Years Jubilee of the ESHPh
  - 23–25 September 1988 at the Provinciaal Museum voor Fotografie, Antwerp, Belgium
- 1985 Bradford (UK) 3rd International Symposium
  - 11–14 April 1985 at the Museum for Photography, Film & Television, Bradford, UK
- 1982 Antwerpen (B) 2nd International Symposium
  - 5 June 1982 at the Crédit Communal de Belgique, Brussels
- 1981 Bath (UK) 1st International Symposium
  - 9–12 April 1981 at the Royal York Hotel, Bath, UK

== Publications ==
=== PhotoResearcher ===
The society's printed journal, PhotoResearcher, has been published since 1990. 2010 saw the journal published three times a year by contributing authors who are internationally recognised experts in the field of photography.

No. 12 onwards:

- Co-editors: Uwe Schögl and Ulla Fischer-Westhauser

No's. 7–11 (2004–2008)

- Co-editors: Anna Auer, Vienna (A), Alistair Crawford, Aberystwyth (UK).

No. 6 (1994–1996)

- Editorial: Alistair Crawford, University of Wales, School of Arts, Aberystwyth (UK).

No. 5 (1993)

- Editorial: Margaret Harker Farrand, Roy Green (UK).

No's. 1–4 (1990–1992)

- Editorial board: Margaret Harker Farrand, Roy Green, Anthony Hamber, Sidney F. Ray (UK).

== Past presidents ==
- 2004–2008
  - President: Anna Auer (Vienna, Austria)
  - Vice-president: Uwe Schögl (Assistant Director and Senior Curator of Photography at the Picture Archive of the Austrian National Library, Vienna, Austria)
- 2001–2003 (provisory committee)
  - President: Anna Auer (Vienna, Austria)
  - Vice-president: Johan Swinnen (Antwerp/Brussels, Belgium)
- 1997–2001
  - President: Margaret Harker Farrand (Croydon/Surrey, UK)
  - Vice-president: Karl Steinorth (President of the German Society for Photography, Cologne, Germany)
- 1993–1997
  - President: Margaret Harker Farrand (Croydon/Surrey, UK)
  - Vice-president: Karl Steinorth (President of the Deutsche Gesellschaft für Photographie (from 1996), Cologne, Germany)
- 1989–1993
  - President: Margaret Harker Farrand (Croydon/Surrey, UK)
  - Vice-president: Rune Hassner (Stockholm, Sweden)
- 1986–1989
  - President: Margaret Harker Farrand (Egdean, UK)
  - Vice-president: Rune Hassner (Stockholm, Sweden)
- 1982–1986
  - President: Laurent Roosens (Mortsel/Antwerp, Belgium)
  - Vice-president: Margaret Harker (Egdean, UK)
- 1978–1982
  - President: Laurent Roosens (Mortsel/Antwerp, Belgium)
  - Vice-president: Margaret Harker (Egdean, UK)
