= Jack Mikrut =

Swedish photographer

Jack Adam Mikrut is a Swedish photographer.

== Background ==
Born in Kraków, Poland, he emigrated to Canada at an early age. He lived in Luseland and Winnipeg before moving to Sweden in 1975. Jack commenced his career as freelance photographer in 1982. His first larger project was documenting the work of Swedish consultants VBB, now Sweco, in Egypt as they studied tombs in the Valley of the Queens and other Egyptian monuments in order to devise a plan of action to save them from saline corrosion.

In 1984 he began work as a staff photographer at the Swedish national daily newspaper Svenska Dagbladet and was accepted as a member of the picture agency Tiofoto. His international assignments included, among others, a feature on UNDP missions in Mali and Burkina Faso and coverage of the refugee situation after the Iran–Iraq War in 1988 for the Swedish Red Cross.

In 1991 he joined the staff of Pressens Bild, now Scanpix, picture agency. He specialised in news, and sports photography covering most major sports events, including 6 Olympic Games.

Since 1990 he has been the recipient of numerous national and international honors, such as the 2001 Fuji European Sport Photographer of the Year award. In 2002 his black and white portfolio portraying swimmer Emma Igelström placed first in the competition by French sports newspaper L'Équipe and the International Olympic Committee (IOC).

Jack is currently employed as staff photographer at Dagens Industri, a daily business newspaper based in Stockholm Sweden. He is also collaborating as official photographer for the Swedish Olympic Committee and as a consultant on business photography for Activated Logic, Australia.

== Awards ==
- 1990 Swedish Picture of The Year 3rd prize Humour
- 1992 Swedish Picture of The Year 2nd prize Portrait
- World Press Photo diploma excellent work Sport singles
- 1993 Swedish Picture of The Year 3rd prize Sport Portfolio / 3rd prize Open category
- 1994 Swedish Picture of The Year 1st prize Humour
- 1998 Swedish Picture of The Year 2nd prize Sport Portfolio
- 1999 Sport Fuji Press Photo Award Sweden 1st prize
- 2000 Swedish Picture of The Year 3rd prize Spot News / 3rd prize Sport Stories
- 2001 Swedish Picture of The Year 1st prize Sport Feature Stories / 2nd prize Sport Feature singles / 2nd prize Sport Action / 3rd prize Sport Feature Stories
- 2001 1st prize Sport Fuji Euro Press Photo Award Sweden
- 2002 Fuji European Sport Photographer of the Year
- 2002 1st prize Black & White Portfolio Sports competition by IOC and L'Équipe
- 2003 Swedish Picture of The Year 2nd prize / World Handball Photo of The Year 1st prize
- 2004 62nd POYi USA Contest 3rd prize Sports singles
- 2005 Swedish Picture of The Year 3rd prize News
- 2007 Swedish Picture of The Year 1st prize Portrait
- 2007 Society for News Design Award of Excellence photography /single photos
- 2010 Wieliczka Salt Mine Through the Lens] 1st prize Works by Miners category, Wieliczka Salt Mine Through the Lens distinction Saline Labyrinth category
- 2011 68th POYi USA Contest Award of Excellence Portrait category

== Exhibitions ==
- 2005 Digital Photo Fair Sollentuna exhibition: "Travelling with the Crown Princess"
- 2006 Home & Digital Fair Stockholm exhibition: "Travelling with the Crown Princess"
- 2006 TUR Travel Fair Gothenburg exhibition: "Travelling with the Crown Princess"
- 2007 Digital Home and Photo Fair Stockholm exhibition: "Portraits"
