= Dariusz Mikrut =

Polish chess player (born 1979)

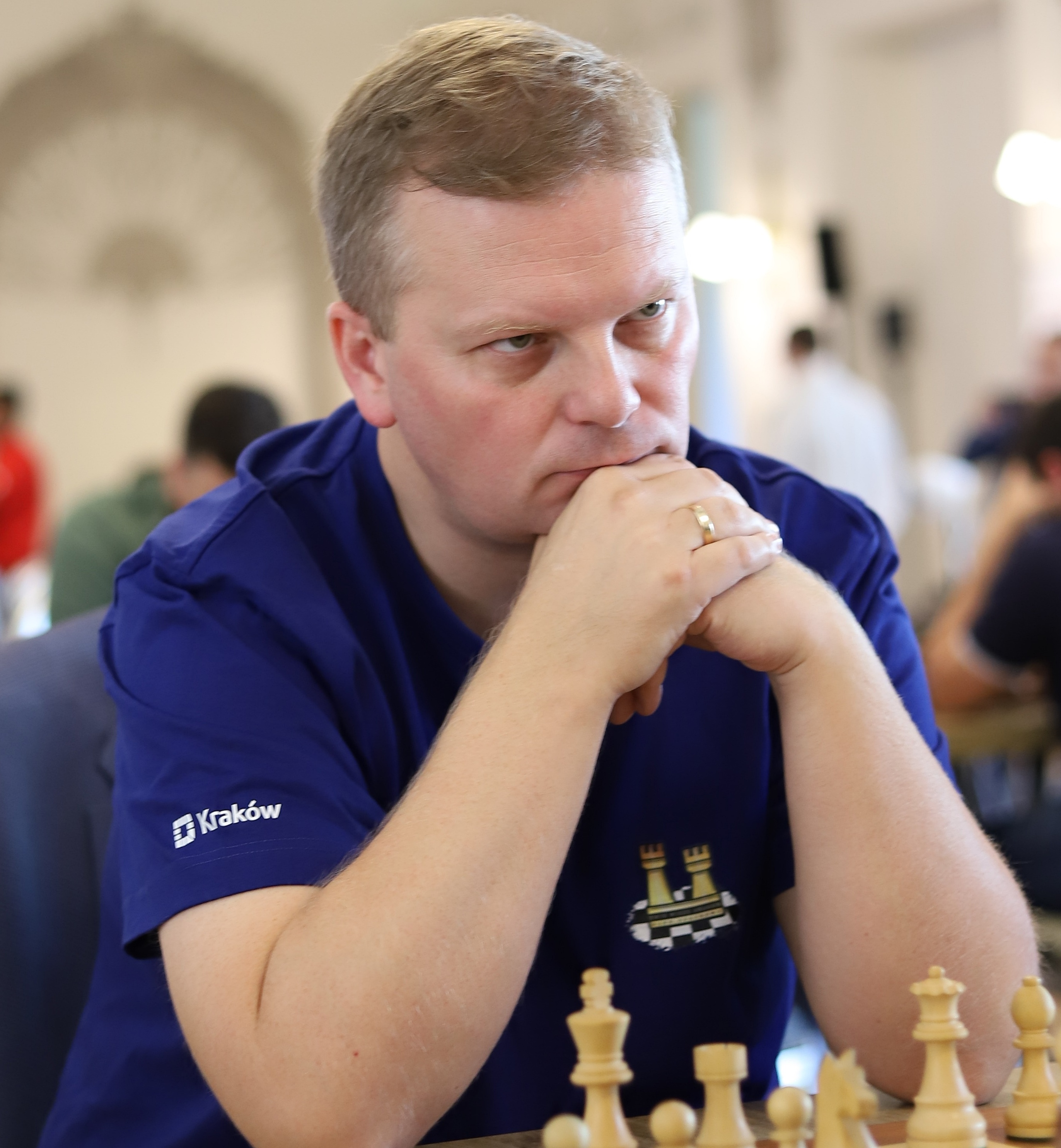
- Dariusz Mikrut in 2021

Personal information
- Born: 17 February 1979 (age 47) Rzeszów, Poland

Chess career
- Country: Poland
- Title: International Master (2006)
- Peak rating: 2433 (January 2007)

Dariusz Mikrut (born 17 February 1979) is a Polish chess International Master (2006).

== Chess career ==
During his career, Dariusz Mikrut advanced to the finals of the Polish Junior Chess Championships three times. In 1997 in Jarosławiec he achieved the best result on the 1st board during the Polish Junior Team Chess Championships (scoring 9½ points in 10 games). In 2001, starting in the colors of the club ZKS Zelmer Rzeszów, Dariusz Mikrut won a bronze medal in Brzeg Dolny Polish Team Blitz Chess Championship. A year later, he took the 1st place in the international chess tournament in Rzeszów and took the 3rd place in the Slovakia Open Chess Championship in Prešov. In 2002 he took the 1st place in Frýdek-Místek. In 2006 he won swiss-system tournaments in Dobczyce and Liberec and took 2nd place in Orlová. In Józef Dominik's memorial in Dobczyce Dariusz Mikrut also triumphed in 2007 and 2008. In 2009, he shared the 2nd place (after Piotr Brodowski, together with, among others, Mirosław Grabarczyk) in Kowalewo Pomorskie. In 2013, he shared the 1st place (together with Artur Jakubiec) in the International Małopolska Chess Championship. In 2016, he repeatedly won bronze medal in Polish Team Blitz Chess Championship. Dariusz Mikrut seven times participated in Polish Team Chess Championship with chess clubs ZKS Zelmer Rzeszów and TS Wisła Kraków (1998, 2002-2003, 2014-2017). In Slovak Chess Extraliga with chess club ŠK Prakovce he won individual gold (2017) and silver (2016) medals.

Dariusz Mikrut achieved the highest rating in his career so far on January 1, 2007, with a score of 2433 points, he was ranked 39th among Polish chess players.

Since 2005 Dariusz Mikrut has been running a chess website Mistrz. He also trains youth chess players.
