= Caroline Hebbe =

Swedish art photographer (1930–2018)

Caroline Hebbe (3 February 1930 – 2018) was a Swedish art photographer active in the 1950s–1970s and working in a subjective style in affinity with the Fotoform movement. She later became an international curator of Swedish arts, crafts and design.

== Career ==
Caroline Hebbe, born 3 February 1930 in Uppsala, Sweden, was a daughter of Per Magnus Hebbe and Brita Hebbe (Benedicks), sister of Agneta Hebbe and half-sister of Marianne Wändell. She had a brief career as a photographer; nevertheless, from 1949, she gained international attention for her ‘subjective’ photography.

After winning some contests she participated in Young Photographers II, where she exhibited nineteen photographs with a mixture of surrealistically inspired motifs, abstract compositions, portraits and documentary imagery, including a black-and-white composition entitled Venini, depicting wire mesh and a twig on an otherwise completely empty beach; an image of a haunting surrealist quality. The exhibition was the starting point for a heated debate in Sweden, as in the rest of Europe, around "the new image”. When an edited second edition of the exhibition toured New York and Paris in 1951, Caroline Hebbe was the remaining female participant.

That year Hebbe married Hans Hammarskiöld (1925–2012), one of the leading names in Swedish photography. In 1952 they undertook a month-long trip to New York to study the new American photography and to meet famous photographers, including Irving Penn, Edward Steichen and W. Eugene Smith. Steichen was the head of the photography department at the Museum of Modern Art. The short meeting led to a lifelong friendship. Both took portraits of Steichen, and Steichen eventually became godfather of the couple's first child, their daughter Suzanne Caroline Hammarskiold, born in 1955. Their other children were Viveca Madeleine Hammarskiold, born 1956 and Richard Hebbe-Hammarskiold (1961).

== Recognition ==
From 1947, during Alfred Westholm’s directorship of the Gothenburg Art Museum the institution had started to collect work in a new category: art photography. Made by contemporary Swedish photographers the acquisitions were first shown in 1953 in the exhibition Swedish Photo Art 1948-1951. In the catalogue, twenty-four artists’ works are illustrated, three of which were by women and one was Fish-net (1951) by Caroline Hebbe. This work was featured in a publication by Otto Steinert, a leader of the subjective photography movement, Fotoform.

Edward Steichen selected work by both Caroline and Hans for The Museum of Modern Art's world-touring The Family of Man exhibition, which was seen by 9 million visitors. In the foreword to the catalogue is portrait of him taken by Caroline Hebbe-Hammarskiöld.

== Later life ==
A letter from March 1977 held in the Grace M. Mayer Collection (Curator of Photography 1964-1968 and Curator of the Edward Steichen Archive 1968-1996 at The Museum of Modern Art) of MoMA, was written by Caroline to Edward Steichen and mentions a visit to New York and her divorce from Hans Hammarskiöld. She later married Jacob Palmstierna and in 1983 became the Exhibition Manager for the Swedish Society of Crafts and Design, and Coordinator Excellence in Swedish Form until 1999, staging exhibitions both in Sweden and in 29 countries internationally, including Faces of Swedish Design at the I.B.M. Gallery of Science and Art in New York, and the Cranbrook Academy of Art in September 1988. She died in 2018 and was buried in Danderyd Municipality, Stockholm County, Sweden.

== Exhibitions ==
- Subjektive Fotografie - Bilder der 50er Jahre, Saarland Museum, Oct 1985 - Nov 1985, Saarbrücken, Germany
- Subjective Photography: Images of the 1950s, Finnish Museum of Photography - Suomen valokuvataiteen museo, Aug 1985 - Sep 1985, Helsinki, Finland
- Subjective Photography: Images of the 1950s, Kulturhuset, Apr 1985 - Jun 1985, Stockholm, Sweden
- Subjective Photography: Images of the 1950s, Västerbottens museum, Feb 1985 - Mar 1985, Umeå, Sweden
- Subjective Photography: Images of the 1950s, Museum Folkwang, Dec 1984 - Feb 1985, Essen, Eskildsen, Ute, Sweden (Curator)
- Subjective Photography: Images of the 1950s, Blaffer Art Museum - University of Houston, Nov 1984 - Dec 1984, Houston, Texas
- Subjective Photography: Images of the 1950s, San Francisco Museum of Modern Art - SFMOMA, Jun 1984 - Jul 1984, San Francisco, California
- Photographs from the Museum Collection, November 26, 1958 – January 18, 1959, the Museum of Modern Art (MoMA), New York City, New York
- The Family of Man, January 24 to May 8 at the New York MoMA and international tour of thirty-seven countries on six continents
- Postwar European Photography, May 26–August 23, 1953, the Museum of Modern Art (MoMA), New York City, New York
- Swedish Photo Art 1948-1951, 1953 at Gothenburg Art Museum.
- Subjektive Fotografie - Internationale Ausstellung moderner Fotografie: Subjektive Fotografie, Hochschule der Bildenden Künste Saar, July 1951 - July 1951, Saarbrücken, Germany
- Young Photographers, 1949, Stockholm, Sweden

== Collections ==
An untitled dye transfer print by Caroline Hebbe-Hammarskiold in the period 1948 1953 is in the collection of the Museum of Modern Art in New York.
