= Paweł Stempin =

Polish chess player (born 1959)

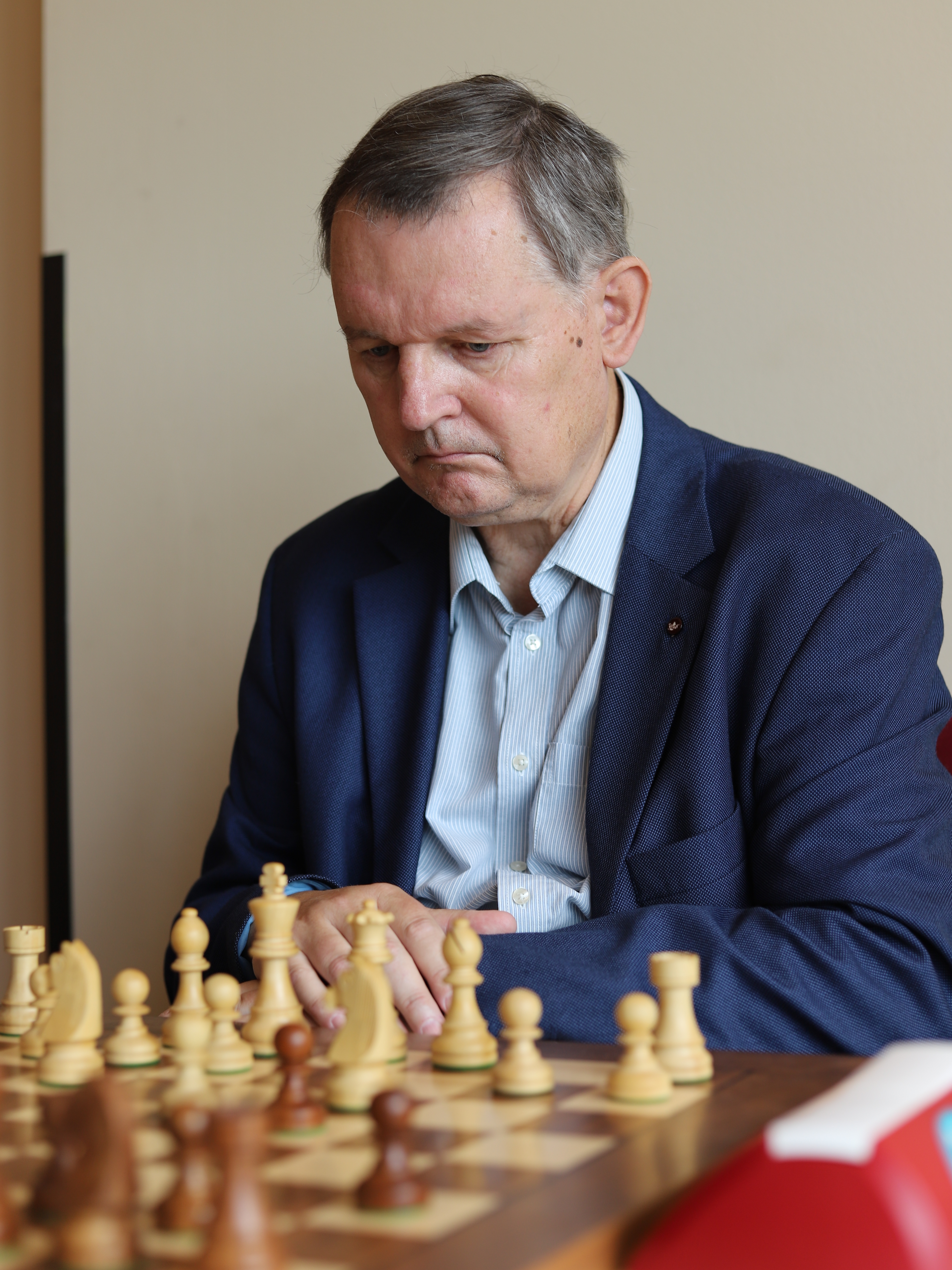
- Paweł Stempin in 2021

Personal information
- Born: 13 July 1959 (age 66) Poznań, Poland

Chess career
- Country: Poland
- Title: International Master (1984)
- Peak rating: 2470 (January 1990)

Paweł Stempin (born 13 July 1959) is a Polish chess International Master (1984).

== Chess career ==
Paweł Stempin began to achieve his first successes in the second half of 1970s. During this period, he won three medals of the Polish Youth Chess Championships: gold (1976, Płock, in U17 age group), silver (1977, Bolesławiec, in U20 age group) and bronze (1975, Legnica, in U17 age group). In 1977, he represented Poland at the World Junior Chess Championship in U20 age group in Innsbruck. In the 1980s Paweł Stempin advanced to the top of Polish chess players. Between 1979 and 1990 he appeared in the finals of Polish Chess Championships ten times, winning three medals: two silver (in Poznań in 1984 and Warsaw in 1990 - after a play-off for the title of Polish Champion with Włodzimierz Schmidt and Zbigniew Jaśnikowski) and bronze (Zielona Góra, 1982). Also he won five medals in Polish Team Chess Championship: gold (1987) and 4 bronze (1985, 1989, 1998, 2001).

In 1984, Paweł Stempin won the international chess round-robin tournament in Poznań, in 1986 he took 1st place in the Swiss-system tournament in Malmö, and three years later he repeated this achievement in the next chess tournament open, played at Lyngby. In 1988, he won the 1st Polish Rapid Chess Championship in Bydgoszcz. Four times (in the years 1982–1989) Paweł Stempin competed in Akiba Rubinstein Memorial in Polanica-Zdrój, the highest place (4th - the best of Poles) taking in 1989.

Paweł Stempin played for Poland in the Chess Olympiads:

- In 1984, at second reserve board in the 26th Chess Olympiad in Thessaloniki (+3, =5, -2),
- In 1988, at first reserve board in the 28th Chess Olympiad in Thessaloniki (+4, =2, -2).

Paweł Stempin played for Poland in the European Team Chess Championships:

- In 1989, at fifth board in the 9th European Team Chess Championship in Haifa (+2, =2, -4).

Paweł Stempin played for Poland in the World Youth U26 Team Chess Championship:

- In 1981, at first reserve board in the 3rd World Youth U26 Team Chess Championship in Graz (+2, =2, -3).

In 1990, for health reasons (despite being nominated), Paweł Stempin did not play for the Olympic chess team in Novi Sad and withdrew from active participation in chess competitions. During his competitive chess career, he published games and analyzes in prestigious chess periodicals: Yugoslav Chess Informant and Dutch New in Chess.

Paweł Stempin reached the highest rating in his career on January 1, 1990, with a score of 2470 points, he was ranked 3rd (behind Aleksander Wojtkiewicz and Aleksander Sznapik) among Polish chess players.
