= Myglaren =

- Poster and DVD cover art
- Written by: Jan Myrdal
- Directed by: Jan Myrdal; Rune Hassner
- Country of origin: Sweden
- Original language: Swedish

Production
- Running time: 86 minutes

Original release
- Network: Sveriges Television
- Release: 31 May 1966

Myglaren was the first made-for-television film produced in Sweden, airing on 31 May 1966.

It was commissioned by the national television broadcaster Sveriges Television and directed by Jan Myrdal and Rune Hassner. The film, which was written by Myrdal, has been labeled as "one of the first successful political films in Sweden." It tells the story of a man, myglaren, who works for the well-being of the employees at an organization presented as "the movement", hinting at the labour movement or the Social Democrats. Through various schemes, he is able to climb the ladder of success and foster himself and his work. The man works flexibly and manipulates his surroundings, allowing him to build a successful career and become a known name in Swedish well-being research. At the end he is assigned to start a governmental authority to foster the well-being of people in the society. The film shows his way to the top through fancy dinners, relationship making, and his handling of the media. Myglaren is 86 minutes long and was filmed in black-and-white.

Photographer Christer Strömholm plays the lead role in the film. The film was a sensation in Sweden and after six airings on television, it reached a larger audience than any prior Swedish film had. Myglaren was a sharp, modern social satire, a format that is unlikely to have been used in any previous Swedish films. Following the multiple airings of Myglaren, the noun "myglare" has been a common expression in Sweden. The dictionary Svensk ordbok defines it as a person who advances his or her own interests by scheming.

Myglaren sparked a debate as to whether or not made-for-television films should qualify for Svenska Filminstitutet's (English: The Swedish Film Institute) quality subsidy. This debate led to a fight between Myrdal and Harry Schein, then-Managing Director of Svenska Filminstitutet. To qualify for the subsidy, the film was resized to a 33 millimeter format and was shown in a cinema once. Despite this, the film did not receive enough quality points in the vote by Svenska Filminstitutet's board of directors. Many believed the vote had been fixed in advance, and Myrdal called Schein a "cultural wangler". When the film was later released in movie theaters for the general public, it was viewed by 297 people, which Schein stated was "hopefully an unbreakable all-time low for Swedish cinema." Myglaren was released on DVD in 2004 by the distributor Folkets Bio.
