= Zbigniew Jaśnikowski =

Polish chess player (born 1955)

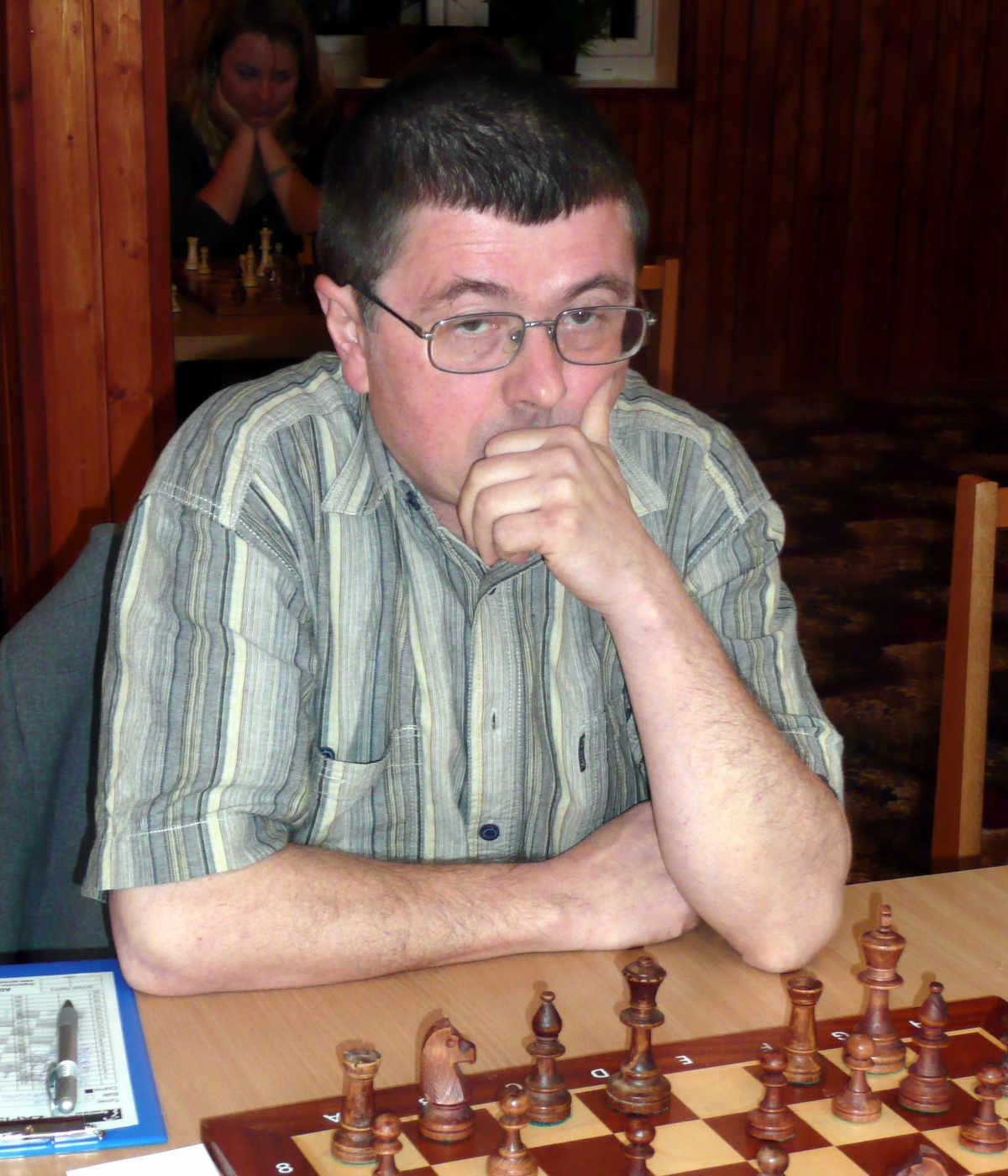
- Zbigniew Jaśnikowski in 2008

Personal information
- Born: 15 May 1955 (age 71) Wrocław, Poland

Chess career
- Country: Poland
- Title: International Master (1981)
- Peak rating: 2475 (January 1994)

Zbigniew Jaśnikowski (born 15 May 1955) is a Polish chess International Master (1981).

== Chess career ==
In 1976 Zbigniew Jaśnikowski made his debut in the Swiss-system tournament final of Polish Chess Championship in Bydgoszczy, taking 13th place with 63 players. Until 1992 he participated in the finals of the national chess championship ten times, achieving the greatest success in 1990 in Warsaw, where (after with Włodzimierz Schmidt and Paweł Stempin) won the bronze medal. Also he won three medals in Polish Team Chess Championship: silver (1999) and 2 bronze (1990, 2000).

Zbigniew Jaśnikowski achieved his first serious successes in 1980, winning international chess tournament in Pristina and taking 3rd place in the international chess tournament in Wrocław. In 1987 he won the open chess tournament in Warsaw (before Pavel Blatný), in 1988 - in Esbjerg (North Sea Cup, tournament B), while in 1989 and 1990 he won twice in Aarhus. In 1990 Zbigniew Jaśnikowski also won in Douai (against Nino Kirov, Zigurds Lanka, Gennadij Timoscenko, Aleksander Wojtkiewicz and Andrei Sokolov) and Taastrup (tournament B), and in 1991 - in Dubai. In 1992, he shared the 1st place (together with Aloyzas Kveinys and Mirosław Grabarczyk) in the open tournament Akiba Rubinstein Memorial in Polanica-Zdrój, while in 1994 Zbigniew Jaśnikowski took the 1st place in Memorial of Tadeusz Gniot]] in Police. One of his recent successes was a victory in Berlin in 1999.

Zbigniew Jaśnikowski played for Poland in the Chess Olympiads:

- In 1988, at second reserve board in the 28th Chess Olympiad in Thessaloniki (+1, =2, -1),
- In 1990, at first reserve board in the 29th Chess Olympiad in Novi Sad (+3, =3, -1).

Zbigniew Jaśnikowski played for Poland in the European Team Chess Championships:

- In 1989, at sixth board in the 9th European Team Chess Championship in Haifa (+1, =1, -2).

Zbigniew Jaśnikowski achieved the highest rating in his career on January 1, 1994, with a score of 2475 points, he was ranked 6th among Polish chess players. Since 2000, he participates very rarely in chess tournaments classified by International Chess Federation.
