= Rune Hassner =

Swedish photographer and film director

- Rune Hassner at 31 in America
- Born: 13 August 1928; Östersund, Sweden
- Died: 20 July 2003 (aged 74); Stockholm, Sweden
- Occupation: Photographers
- Years active: 1947–1990s
- Known for: photojournalism

Rune Hassner (13 August 1928 – 19 July 2003) was a Swedish photographer and film director. He directed around fifty documentaries and two feature films, including Myglaren, and illustrated numbers of books and articles with his photography.

== Photographer ==
=== Early career ===
Born to Elin Agata (née Nordin) and Johan Viktor Albin Hessner on 13 August in Östersund in central Sweden, Rune Hassner took up photography in 1942. He started professional work at the age of 19 in 1947 as a press photographer for Uisntidningen and Ostersunds-Postenin in Östersund. From 1947 to 1949 he worked assisting fashion and advertising photographer Rolf Winquist, at the Ateljé Uggla (Uggla Studio) in Stockholm.

=== Ethos ===
Pictorialism as practiced in photography club competitions and exhibitions promoted a romantic national pride during the Second World War in neutral Sweden. Post-war, Hassner joined a counter-reaction among the country's young photographers who reacted against such painterly pretensions, practitioners of which they derisively nicknamed 'Rosenlunderiet' after an old peoples' home in Stockholm.

Hassner exhibited in 1949 with some of the other young photographers, dubbed "De Unga" (The Young), who were to form the cooperative Tio fotografer. Their show, organised by editor of FOTO magazine Lars Wickman, amounted to open provocation of the conservative photographic establishment. The majority of the exhibitors returned to their specialities in fashion, journalism, nature photography, and so on, while Rune Hassner took up the cause of the young radicals, writing polemics in the trade journals.

=== Paris ===
At the age of 21, like many other young Swedish practitioners, he traveled to Paris and was there for eight years as a freelance photographer undertaking reportage and press work, specialising in the subjects of culture, politics and fashion.

He first exhibited solo at the Rotohallen, Stockholm and published his first book, Parispromenad. He also wrote for Swedish photographic periodicals on the new European photography, though his ideals were those of a more personally and poetically engaged photojournalist. In a 1951 issue of the magazine Fotografisk årsbok he wrote:

...values, lines and tones scattered on paper by optical and chemical means or processes; that's really that photography is [ but ] you don't have to use cheap tricks or things that hit and miss to make good pictures; despite all the aesthetic means of expression and subtleties, honour will always be given to the one who with the camera dares to go on the attack against violence and oppression, who dares to poke at habitual thinking and falsehood [ . . . ] The photograph that gives voice to human freedom, to the values of freedom, to humanity will always be valuable, even if it will not be accepted as great photography in aesthetic connoisseur circles.

At 26, his street photography, made with a Rolleiflex, was published in Camera magazine in 1954, with a commentary in which he discussed his love of making candid images in the city environment, his technique and motivation;

For these photos I used a Rolleiflex, ultra-sensitive film, often ordinary developing paper to get details even in poor lighting; camera set at 3m, exposure usually ½s sec and aperture 5.6 or 8; I carried the camera around in my hand, always with one finger on the trigger, and often snapped immediately without consulting the viewfinder. As long as you carry the device inconspicuously in your hand, you can get very close to people without them reacting [ . . . ] Tired of working in the studio with the camera on wheels, with a lot of lamps, with large format negatives, retouching and smiling for the public, the opportunity and freedom to observe the real face of the people on the street drew me.

By contrast he attacked the experimental photography in the exhibition Subjektive Fotografie as constituting just another form of superficially picturesque aesthetic play. Though apparently retrograde, this stance was consistent with his conviction that photographs should communicate something consequential.

=== International commissions ===
Hassner journeyed during 1953-4 with writer Olle Strandberg to Algiers, across the Sahara, Niger, Cameroon, French Equatorial Africa and the Belgian Congo, Nairobi in Kenya, Rhodesia and South Africa, to Madagascar and then Sudan and Egypt to photograph for Strandberg's book Jambo, later reissued by Houghton and Miffin and by international publishers, with his African pictures being included in other publications. One reviewer remarked that the "photography by Rune Hassner adds immensely to the reader's enjoyment of the book."

In December 1955 he flew to New York and then, in February 1956 to Hawaii to work there as a stills photographer on a documentary film production, and in June traveled in Central America via Puerto Rico, and to India, USA, Australia and Asia. A photograph, from October that year, of barricades in Budapest during the Russian invasion appeared in a November 1956 LIFE magazine credited to 'Rune Hassner from Gamma.' The newspaper Svenska Dagbladet awarded him for his photography in 1957.

=== Tio fotografer ===
Hassner returned to Sweden in 1958 and became one of the founders that year of the professional collective Tio fotografer ('Ten Photographers') with Sten Didrik Bellander (1921–2001), Harry Dittmar, Sven Gillsäter (1921–2001), Georg Oddner(1923–2007), Lennart Olson (1925–2010), Hans Hammarskiöld (1925–2012), Hans Malmberg, Tore Johnson, and Pål Nils Nilsson, and their subsequent photo agency Tiofoto in 1959. The co-operative, each paying a set fee and shared profits, office, studio, and darkroom facilities in Stockholm, but otherwise remained independent in style and approach. Hassner was also associated with the American agency Black Star, founded in 1936.

The group Tio fotografer was influential in Swedish photography and they regularly exhibited at significant venues for photography. Hassner's photographs of workers in China were included amongst work of the other members in a US Library of Congress traveling exhibition during 1971-2, and the whole group was presented at the Hasselblad Centre in 1998.

A retrospective of his photography toured major galleries in Sweden and Camden Art Centre in London over the years 1982-86.

== Filmmaker ==
In common with many other photographers of his generation and in the group Tio fotografer, Rune Hassner switched from still photography to film when the Swedish and international picture magazines which had sustained their practice were gradually displaced by television. His work in film was a direct continuation of his photo reportage; from 1965, in his late thirties, Hassner produced many documentaries for Swedish television, including programs on photographers Rolf Winquist and Brassaï. Like the emerging documentarians, the Briton Richard Leacock and American Pennebaker, Hassner used light camera equipment to produce the 1966 travel documentary of the carnival in Trinidad, Jump up. The film's socio-critical tone amid the flow of song, rhythms and music, was about the music as an expression of popular resistance to oppression. In the same spirit, in 1969 Hassner made Bilder för miljoner, an extended documentary series on the history of mass-produced photographic art, emphasising its socially critical function, and as a political weapon. It was renamed 'Images for the Millions' for an English version produced for the School of Journalism in the University of Minnesota.

With the writer Jan Myrdal, he produced, in black-and-white and on a small budget, the first Swedish made-for-television feature film Myglaren (1966) recognised as "one of the first successful political films in Sweden", and which, according to Myrdal "described official Sweden, which was then developing into [a] kleptocracy." They followed that with Hjalparen (1968), and in 1978 collaborated on six films about China for Swedish television, Myrdal having dedicated his book Chinese Journey, photographed by his wife Gun Kessle, to Hassner in 1965.

== Academic, curator, historian ==
Hassner flew to New York to speak alongside Ralph Morse, Ken Heyman, Milton Greene and Wayne Miller at the annual Photojournalism Conference at the University of Miami in April 1960, and in February 1973 again presented in the United States, in a panel 'Photojournalism: A Matter of Life and Death' with Richard Olsenius and R. Smith Schuneman in conjunction with the exhibition "Margaret Bourke-White: Photojournalist" at the Walker Art Center.

Hassner contributed to the founding, with its editor Jan Myrdal, of the left-wing journal Folket i Bild/Kulturfront in 1971 and in 1977, was a Founder-Member and Board Member of the European Society for the History of Photography. He was head of the first university photography course, Institutionen for Fotografi, at Goteborgs Universitet from 1983 and founder/head of the Hasselblad centre in Gothenburg 1988-94. He was an advisor on the third edition of Martin Evans' Amanda Hopkinson's Contemporary Photographers, in which several of his films and publications on photographers are referenced, also advisor to Houston Fotofest 1986 and 1988,

Innovations during Hassner's curatorship at the Hasselblad Centre include Art, Industry, and the State, which examined fourteen issues of the then neglected Soviet propaganda magazine USSR in Construction of 1930-36, in which artists and photographers Alexander Rodchenko, Varvara Stepanova and Max Alpert introduced Bauhaus and Constructivist design. The exhibition was also shown in the George R. Brown Convention Center at Houston FotoFest '92.

He became an honorary doctor in 1997 at the Faculty of Humanities at the University of Gothenburg. Naomi Rosenblum notes that in developing collections at the University, Hassner "encouraged interest in the history of American and European photojournalism and social documentation through his extensive curatorial, research, and publishing activities."

== Personal life ==
Rune Hassner was born in Östersund and married Eva Mari Hassner (née Polasek, 1933) in 1958, and they divorced in 1984. They had no children.

== Awards ==
- 1957: Prize bestowed by Stockholm newspaper Svenska Dagbladet

== Legacy ==
In 1998 the Hasselblad Centre acquired Hassner's photographic library.

== Exhibitions ==
=== Individual ===
- 1951: Solo exhibition at the Rotohallen, Stockholm, toured to New York.
- 1951: Teaterhuset, Östersund, Sweden
- 1962: Indian Village, Pub Gallery, Stockholm
- 1962: Nimba, Museum of Art, Eskilstuna, Sweden
- 1962: Indian Village, Domus, Visby, Sweden
- 1962: Indian Village, Domus, Sundsvall, Sweden
- 1962: Indian Village, Casselska, Grängesberg, Sweden
- 1964: Nimba, Norrköpings Museum, Sweden
- 1982: Fotohuset, Göteborg, Sweden (retrospective)
- 1982: Nikon Gallery, Stockholm (retrospective)
- 1983: Västerbottens Museum (retrospective), Umeä; Ornsköldsvik
- 1985: Camden Arts Centre, London (retrospective)
- 1985: Dalarnas Museum, Falun, Sweden (retrospective)
- 1985: Länsmuseet, Gävle, Sweden (retrospective)
- 1985: Upplands Konstmuseum, Uppsala, Sweden (retrospective)
- 1985: Jämtlands läns museum, Östersund, Sweden (retrospective)
- 1986: Norrbottens Museum, Lulea, Sweden (retrospective)
- 1990: Konstmuseet, Trollhättan, Sweden
- 1995: 21 January–19 March: Rune Hassner, Photojournalist. Hasselblad Center, Göteborg, Sweden
- 2004, from 28 February: Rune Hassner Avstamp. fotomuseet Sundsvall, Magasinsgatan 12, Sundsvall

=== Group ===
- 1949: Unga Fotografer, Rotohallen, Stockholm
- 1951: Jeunes Photographes Suedois, Kodak Gallery, Paris
- 1951 12–29 July: Subjektive Fotografie. Staatlichen Schule für Kunst und Handwerk, Saarbrücken
- 1954, 27 November– 27 January 1955: Subjektive Fotografie 2. Staatlichen Schule für Kunst und Handwerk, Saarbrücken
- 1955, 18 July - Spring 1957: C.S. Association Travelling Exhibition of International Photography, 1955–57
- 1957: Internationale Biennale, Venezia
- 1958: FOTOKONST 1958, City Art Gallery, Lund, Sweden
- 1959: Young European Photography, Van Abbemuseum, Eindhoven, Netherlands
- 1963, 27 August– 2 September: Photography 63 / An International Exhibition. An invitational exhibition. A 25 member nominating committee identified photographers under 40 years of age who were invited to submit three photographs each. New York State Exposition
- 1971-2: Contemporary Photographs From Sweden. US Library of Congress touring exhibition
- 1973, 19 May–2 September: Rune Hassner Lima. Catalogue published by Fotografiska museet, Moderna museet. Katalognummer 109. Text of catalog by Rune Hassner, captions to pictures by Sven Johansson.
- 1976: Tio fotografer, Gal. Aronowitsch, Stockholm
- 1977: Tio fotografer, Rencontres Internationales de Photographie, Arles (travelled to La Photogalerie, Paris)
- 1982: 11 Fotografos Suecos, Consejo Mexicano de Fotografia, México
- 1984: Subjektive Fotografie: Images Of the 50's. Fotografische Sammlung in Museum Folkwang.
- 2004, from 17 October: Rune Hassner Fotografier. BildMuseet, Umeå University
- 2010, from 4 April: Ten Photographers: Sten Didrik Bellander, Harry Dittmer, Sven Gillsater, Hans Hammarskjöld, Rune Hassner, Tore Yngve Johnson, Hans Malmberg, Pal-Nils Nilsson, Georg Oddner, Lennart Olson. The Eighth International Photography Month in Moscow: Photobiennale 2010, State Museum of Contemporary Art, Gogolevsky boulevard,10, Moscow
- 2010, 10 November–23 January 2011: Tio Fotografiska: The Collective. Institut suédois, 11 rue Payenne, 75003 Paris

== Collections ==
- Moderna Museet, Stockholm, Sweden
- Library of Congress, Washington, DC. USA
- Bibliothèque nationale de France, Paris
- Norsk Fotohistorisk Forening, Oslo
- Museum of Photography (Valokuvamuseon), Helsinki
- Provincial Museum voor Fotografie, Antwerp
- Museum Folkwang, Essen, Germany
- Hasselblad Center, Göteborg, Sweden

== Filmography ==
- Jump up (1966)
- Myglaren (1966)
- Hjälparen (1967)
- Photo by Boubat (1967)
- Bilder för miljoner (1970)
- Ansikten och fragment av blommor, about Rolf Winqvist (1970)
- Brassai (1971)
- Pittsburgh – porträtt av en stad, about Eugene W. Smith (1971)
- Realismens triumfer – Honoré de Balzac (1975)
- Kina mot år 2000 (1978)
- Bilden som vapen I, II och III (1978, 1982, 1988), 13 programs for television on the history of the caricature and political imagery, with Jan Myrdal, with 7 supplementary broadcasts.

== Publications ==
- Aurén, Sven Anders Göte; Hassner, Rune (1950). Parispromenad. Wahlström & Widstrand. OCLC 35454274.
- Hassner, Rune (1951). Sköna Frankrike. Foto: Rune Hassner; text: Sven Stolpe. Wahlström & Widstrand. OCLC 35588654.
- Hassner, Rune (1953). Liftare och läckergommar. Wahlström & Widstrand. OCLC 186173357.
- Olle, Strandberg (1954). Jambo. Rabén & Sjögren/Vi. OCLC 186240285.
- Aurén, Sven (1957). Paris och parisarna. Wahlström & Widstrand. OCLC 186100230.
- Det nya Kina (1957)
- Strandberg, Olle (1958). O. Lättjans Öar : En Färd Till Karibiska Sjön Med Komubus I Kölvattnet (in Swedish). Stockholm: Raben & Sjögren-Tidningen Vi. OCLC 470128697.
- Hassner, Rune; Andersson, Sven O. (1962). Vår Indiska By. Stockholm: Rabén & Sjögren. OCLC 28492758.
- Hassner, Rune (1971). André Kertész: Fotografien, 1913-1971. Stockholm: Moderna Museet.
- Riis, Jacob August; Hassner, Rune (1987). Jacob A. Riis: Socialreporter Med Kamera (in Swedish). Lucida. ISBN 978-91-87300-00-4.
- Hassner, Rune (1977). Bilder för miljoner : bildtryck och massframställda bilder från de första blockböckerna, oljetrycken och fotografierna till den moderna pressens nyhetsbilder och fotoreportage (in Swedish). Internet Archive. [Stockholm] : Sveriges radio : Rabén & Sjögren. ISBN 978-91-29-49919-3.
- Hasselblad Center; Hassner, Rune (1989). Rolf Winquist : Porträttör : En Återblick På En Ledande Svensk Ateljéfotografs Arbeten 1940-1968 (in Swedish). Göteborg: Hasselblad Centre. OCLC 81747003.
- Hassner, Rune; Jonsson, Rune; Myrdal, Jan; Örnberg, Sune (1993). Rune Hassner : Foto (in Swedish). Stockholm, Sweden: Nilsson & Bergholm. ISBN 9789163019210.
- Hassner, Rune (1990-01-01). "SSSR na strojke". Fund og Forskning i Det Kongelige Biblioteks Samlinger. 29: 167. doi:10.7146/fof.v29i1.40936. ISSN 2246-6061.
- Hassner, Rune; Erna and Victor Hasselblad Foundation (1996). The Hasselblad Awards 1980-1995. Göteborg, Sweden: Erna and Victor Hasselblad Center for Photography. ISBN 9789163040221. OCLC 39830541.
- Hassner R. Bilder & Ord : Bibliografi Filmografi Utställningsförteckning Med Mera. Göteborg: Konst- och bildvetenskapliga institutionen Univ. 2002.
