= Piotr Brodowski =

Polish chess player (born 1989)

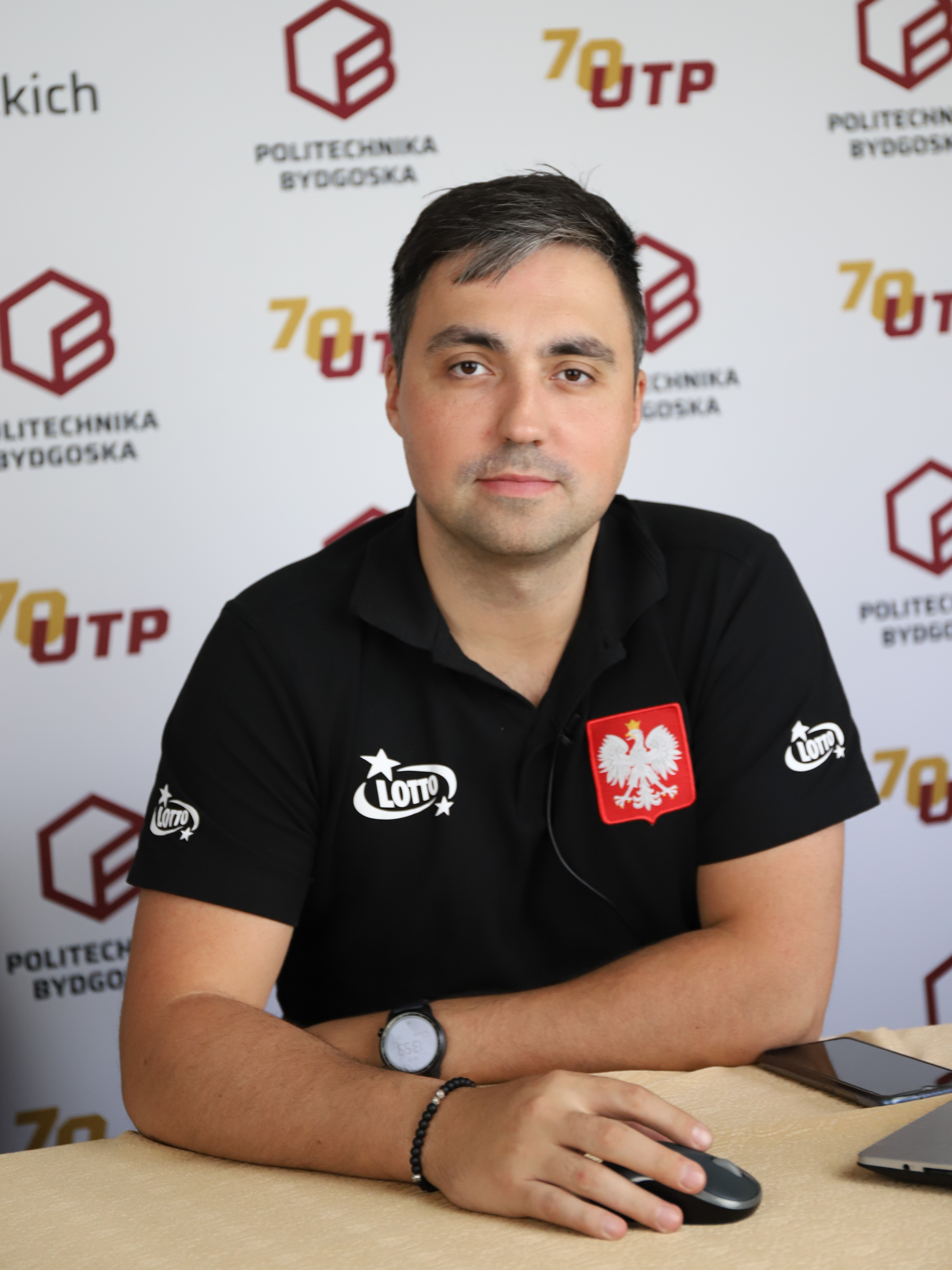
- Piotr Brodowski in 2021

Personal information
- Born: 18 February 1989 (age 37) Głogów, Poland

Chess career
- Country: Poland
- Title: International Master (2016)
- FIDE rating: 2452 (July 2026)
- Peak rating: 2474 (October 2024)

Piotr Brodowski (born 18 February 1989) is a Polish chess International Master (2016).

== Chess career ==
Piotr Brodowski competed many times in the finals of Polish Youth Chess Championships in various age groups and winning five medals: gold (Wisła 1999 - U10 age group), silver (Żagań 2002 - U14 age group) and three bronze (Krynica Morska 1999 - U10 age group; Kołobrzeg 2000 - U12 age group; Środa Wielkopolska 2008 - U20 age group). In 2009, in Bydgoszcz Piotr Brodowski with chess club Odrodzenie (Kożuchów) won Polish Team Blitz Chess Championship. He five times participated in Polish Team Chess Championship with various chess clubs (2002, 2009, 2011, 2014, 2016). In Czech Chess Extraliga with chess club A64 Valoz Grygov Piotr Brodowski won silver (2011) medal. In 2015, in Poznań he ranked 11th in Polish Chess Championship. In 2018, in Szczawno-Zdrój Piotr Brodowski won bronze medal in Polish Blitz Chess Championship.

Piotr Brodowski successes in international chess tournaments include:

- shared 3rd place in Wrocław (2007, after Vadim Shishkin and Mirosław Grabarczyk, together with, among others, Tomasz Warakomski),
- shared 1st place in Gdańsk (2007),
- shared 1st place in Frýdek-Místek (2008),
- shared 2nd place in Lubawka (2008, after Paweł Jaracz, together with Łukasz Cyborowski),
- shared 1st place in Szklarska Poręba (2009),
- 1st place in Kowalewo Pomorskie (2009).

Piotr Brodowski achieved the highest rating in his career so far on 1 July 2016, with a score of 2457 points.
