= Johan Swinnen =

Johan Swinnen may refer to:

- Johan Swinnen (diplomat)
- Johan Swinnen (economist)
