= Georg Oddner =

Swedish photographer (1923–2007)

Georg Oddner (17 October 1923 – 7 October 2007) was one of Sweden's greatest photographers from the 20th century.

Oddner was a jazz musician and studying advertising in the 1940s when he first came into contact with photography through John Melin, art director at Svenska Telegrambyrån in Malmö, the largest advertising agency in Scandinavia. From there, Oddner began working a variety of advertising jobs, including industry, architecture, and clothing, as well as for SAS. In the mid-1950s Oddner traveled to California, South America, the Soviet Union, and the far east. During these travels he was able to pursue photography for his own purposes. With Sten Didrik Bellander (1921–2001), Harry Dittmar, Sven Gillsäter (1921–2001), Rune Hassner(1928–2003), Hans Malmberg and Lennart Olson (1925–2010), Hans Hammarskiöld (1925–2012), Tore Johnson, and Pål Nils Nilsson, he was a member of the professional collective Tio Fotografer ('Ten photographers') formed in 1958, and their subsequent photo agency Tiofoto. The group was influential in Swedish photography. They regularly exhibited at significant venues and the whole group was presented at the Hasselblad Centre in 1998,

He predominantly used Hasselblad and Leica equipment. His favorite photographers included Henri Cartier-Bresson and Richard Avedon.

== Sources ==
- Georg Oddner ville förstå och förklara , Sydsvenskan 7 October 2007.
