= Ims =

Ims is a Norwegian surname. Notable people with the surname include:

- Gry Tofte Ims (born 1986), Norwegian footballer
- Rolf Anker Ims (born 1958), Norwegian ecologist

== See also ==
- IMS (disambiguation)
