= The Icelandic New Business Venture Fund =

The Icelandic New Business Venture Fund (also known as the New Business Venture Fund or the NBVF for short) is an independent company owned by the Icelandic government. It began operations in 1998 after a 1997 reorganization of the banking sector of Iceland. The organization is supervised by the Ministry of Industry and Commerce. Its purposes are strengthening the economy of Iceland and increasing its internationalization. Some of the organization's activities included helping to start Icelandic New Energy and providing start-up capital to companies. It was founded with a budget of ISK 5 billion. However, the organization was not a major success and made few notable accomplishments.

== History ==
The Icelandic New Business Venture Fund was founded in 1998 with an allocation of ISK 5 billion. It was formed as part of substantial alterations to the structure of the Icelandic financial market. These alterations included the merging four investment credit funds owned by the state into the fund and the Icelandic Investment Bank. The organization did poorly due to a global stock market decline. However, it did manage to fund the Blue Lagoon, a major tourist attraction in Iceland. According to the OECD Economic Surveys: Iceland 2006, this was the organization's only notable achievement. In 2004, it received another ISK 1 billion followed by another ISK 1 billion in December 2005.

== Activities ==
The Icelandic New Business Venture Fund is a venture capital fund.

Activities of the fund include providing start-up capital to companies in return for an ownership stake in those companies. They also provide grants and loans. However, few of their investments have proven to be viable and the organization has made few achievements towards their goal; its performance was described in the OECD Economic Surveys: Iceland 2006 as "disappointing".

The fund once entered an agreement with Technological Institute of Iceland to launch a program for supporting "new and innovative" companies. As of 2002, the program was to be implemented by IMPRA on a budget of ISK 60,000,000. Along with the Trade Council of Iceland, the organization has also provided institutional and financial support to the music industry.

An Export Credit Guarantee Department is also operated by the fund. Along with several other organizations, the fund helped to form Icelandic New Energy, a company that aims to eliminate fossil fuel usage in Iceland and have hydrogen fuel be used instead.
