= Hans Malmberg =

Swedish photojournalist

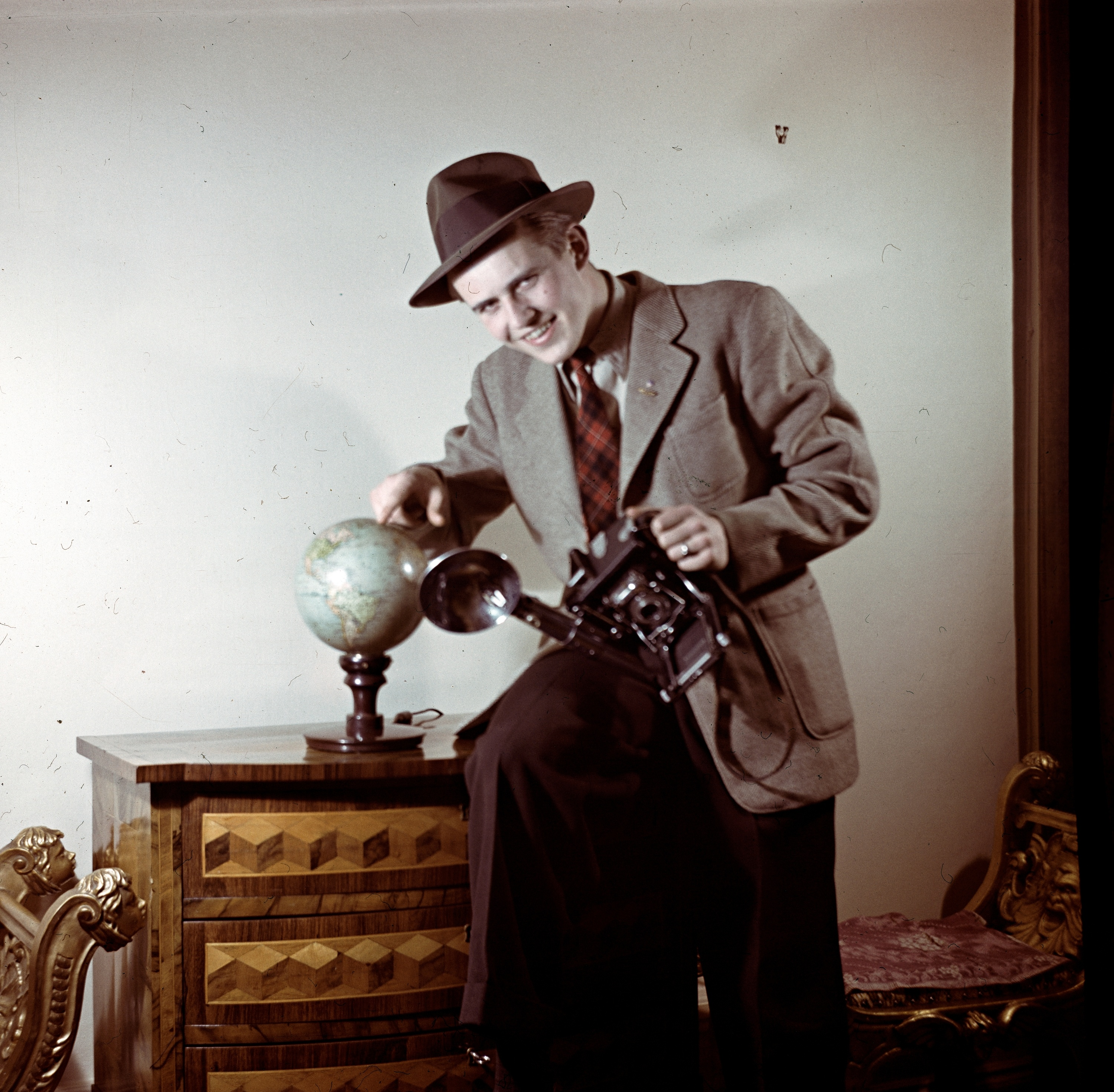
- Malmberg holding a press camera
- Born: 20 September 1927; Solna, Sweden
- Died: 1 September 1977 (aged 49); Vällingby Sweden
- Education: autodidact
- Known for: Photojournalism
- Movement: Tio Fotografer

Hans Henry Malmberg (20 September 1927 in Solna – 1 September 1977 in Vällingby) was a Swedish photojournalist. He was a member of the photographic collective Tio fotografer (Ten photographers).

== Early life and education ==
Malmberg was born on 20 Sept 1927 in Solna, the son of Zewi Eleonora (née Andersson) and foreman Linus Eugen Malmberg. He studied photography at the apprenticeship and vocational school in Stockholm 1941–43, then was assistant at Pressfoto Per Meyerhöffer 1943–46 until he joined Sven Gillsäter at the Pressfoto-bildnytt picture agency 1947–48.

Like other Swedish photographers in their early 20s and inspired by the photojournalism appearing in the major international picture magazines, he rejected the prevailing conservative styles and joined the group Unga fotografer (Young Photographers) with Sten Didrik Bellander, Astrid Bergman, Ellen Dahlberg, Sven Gillsäter, Hans Hammarskiold, Rune Hassner, Tore Johnson, Lennart Nilsson, Lars Nordin and Tor-Ivan Odulf. They ventured out to portray a world that was being rebuilt after the chaotic time post-WW2. The group exhibited in Sweden and internationally over 1949–51, supported by the newspaper Svenska Dagbladet's cultural critic Ull Hård al Segerstad and Aftonbladet's Kurt Bergengren.

== Career ==
Malmberg subsequently went freelance in 1949, and his work appeared in Carl Adam Nycop's Se magazine 1949–1958 including reportage on the Korean War in 1950 totalling about fifty pages over eight issues; in Vi from 1958 and through the 1960s; and in Stockholms-Tidningen. Also during that decade he developed trick techniques for still images for the 1962 Swedish sci-fi film Nils Holgerssons underbara resa ('Adventures of Nils Holgersson') based on Selma Lagerlöf's novel, his material being also published in book form. He also covered the USA, Korea, Suez, Egypt, Iran, Cuba and various countries in Europe, later also from Africa and Southeast Asia, developing a subjective language with a human warmth and solidarity.

=== Tio Fotografer ===
With Sten Didrik Bellander (1921–2001), Harry Dittmar, Sven Gillsäter (1921–2001), Rune Hassner(1928–2003), Georg Oddner(1923–2007), Lennart Olson (1925–2010), Hans Hammarskiöld (1925–2012), Tore Johnson, and Pål Nils Nilsson, he was a member of the professional collective Tio Fotografer ('Ten photographers') formed in 1958 and their subsequent photo agency Tiofoto. The group was influential in Swedish photography and they regularly exhibited at significant venues, and together showed in a retrospective at the Hasselblad Centre in 1998. Malmberg became the group's archivist.

At this time, he also took a great interest in the organization and building up of the activities of the photography collective Ten Photographers.

=== Portraitist ===
Malmberg made portraits of Charlie Chaplin in Switzerland, George Bernard Shaw in England, and Ernest Hemingway in Havana, Cuba.

=== Recognition ===
Malmberg was twenty-seven when curator Edward Steichen selected his photograph of a Swedish bride, backlit by low sunlight and being greeted by her groom at the door of the chapel, for the Museum of Modern Art's 1955 world-touring exhibition The Family of Man seen by 10 million visitors, and in its catalogue.

== Publications ==
Malmberg published illustrated books including; Island (Iceland) in 1951; Dalälven - Industrifloden (Dalälven - Industrial river) in 1957; and the monograph Hans Malmberg: Reporter och flanör ('Hans Malmberg: Reporter and flâneur') published by Rune Jonsson in 1989.

== Personal life and legacy ==
Malmberg married Margrét Guðmundsdóttir (b.1928, Iceland) on 13 Dec 1950. They divorced in 1971 and on 16 February 1972 in Spånga, he married Ingrid Agneta Mälargård (b.1945), daughter of police chief Emric Carlsson Mälargård.

He died on 1 September 1977 and is buried in the memorial grove at Råcksta Cemetery.

Malmberg is represented in the Museum of Modern Art, and there are 363 of Malmberg's images in the Nordic Museum.

== Exhibitions ==
- 1949: Unga forografer, Stockholm
- 1953, 26 August–23 May: Postwar European Photography. MoMA
- 1955, 24 January–8 May: The Family of Man MoMA
- 1951: Jeunes photographes suédois, Paris
- 1971: Contemporary photographers from Sweden. Touring show of more Etna 70 photographs from the Library of Congress, Washington D.C.
- 1973, 18 August–16 September: Contemporary Photographs from Sweden Oklahoma Science and Arts Foundation, Vair Park.
- 1977: Tio Fotografer, La Photogalerie, Paris
- 1977: Reflexions n°1, Canon Photo Gallery, Amsterdam
- 1981: Rétrospective, Fotograficentrum, Stockholm

== Bibliography ==
- Hassner, Rune: Hans H Malmberg. In Karlsson Åsa. Svenskt Biografiskt Lexikon Band 34 Strömberg-Swensson. Svenskt Biografiskt Lexikon 2019.
