= Hans Hammarskiöld =

Swedish photographer (1925–2012)

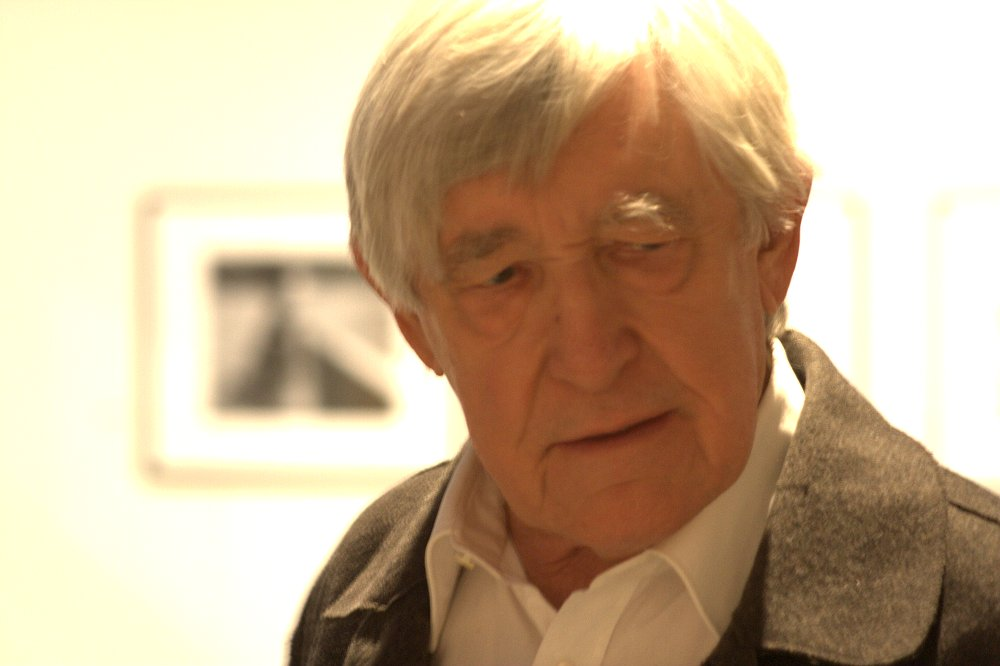
Hans Hammarskiöld in 2009

Hans Arvid Hammarskiöld (17 May 1925 – 12 November 2012) was a Swedish professional photographer. He was active in most genres—for many years he worked as an industrial photographer, but was especially noted for his portraits.

== Career ==
Hammarskiöld was born in 1925 in Stockholm. His breakthrough as a professional photographer came in the 1950s when he worked all over the world. In 1955 his work, along with that of his wife Caroline Hebbe, was selected by Edward Steichen for the world-touring Museum of Modern Art exhibition and book The Family of Man, seen by 9 million visitors. Hammarskiöld worked 1954-1956 for British Vogue.

Hammarskiöld was the last surviving member of the group Tio fotografer (Ten Photographers), which formed in 1958 and was influential in Swedish photography for decades as the illustrations agency Tiofoto. The group included Sten Didrik Bellander (1921–2001), Harry Dittmar, Sven Gillsäter (1921–2001), Rune Hassner (1928–2003), Hans Malmberg (1927-1977), Pål-Nils Nilsson (1929–2002), Georg Oddner (1923-2007), and Lennart Olson (1925–2010).

He is best known as a portraitist and art photographer. Examples of Hammarskiöld's portraiture are his humorous photographs of pop artist Claes Oldenburg in 1966 carrying a huge tube of toothpaste, Pontus Hultén shouting and dressed in an over-decorated coat in 1984, and his profile portrait of Professor Ragnar Josephson in 1965.

In connection with the centennial anniversary of his birth, Fotografiska Stockholm presented the exhibition Hans Hammarskiöld: A Life of Highlights, in 2025.

== Recognition ==
In 2009, a selection of seventy of Hammarskiöld's portraits was on display at the National Museum in Stockholm.

His portraits were later donated to the National Swedish Portrait Gallery.

== Death ==
Hammarskiöld died in 2012 on Lidingö, east of Stockholm, after a short illness, and is buried in the memorial grove at Lidingö cemetery.

== Bibliography ==
- Värmland det sköna ('Country Beauty') 1951
- Stockholmskärlek ('I Love Stockholm') 1953
- Objektivt sett ('Objectively Speaking') 1955
- Billa och jag ('Billa and Me') 1959 (reissued 2009)
- Lillasyster och jag ('Little Sister and Me') 1960
- Promenad på Djursholm ('Walking Around Djursholm') 1964
- Hans Hammarskiöld 1979
- Storsudret 1987
- Subjektivt sett ('Subjectively Speaking') 1993
- Nära Linné ('Near Linné') 1993
- Stockholms fasader ('Stockholm's Facades') 1993 (with Anita Theorell)
- Fasader i Göteborg ('Facades in Gothenburg') 1996
- Stockholm 1997
- Minnets stigar ('The Paths of Memory') 2001 (with Anita Theorell and Per Wästberg)
- En gång i Sverige ('Once in Sweden') 2003
- Resa i tysta rum ('Journeys to Silent Places') 2004 (with Anita Theorell and Per Wästberg)
- Pål Svensson, skulptör ('Pål Svensson, Sculptor') 2005 (with Eva Ström)
- Foto Hammarskiöld : tiden och ljuset ('Hammarskiöld Photographs: Time and Light') 2008
- Profiler ('Portraits') 2009

== Links ==
- Hammarskiöld website
- DigitalMuseum with examples of work
- Memorial website
