= Pål-Nils Nilsson =

Swedish photographer and filmmaker

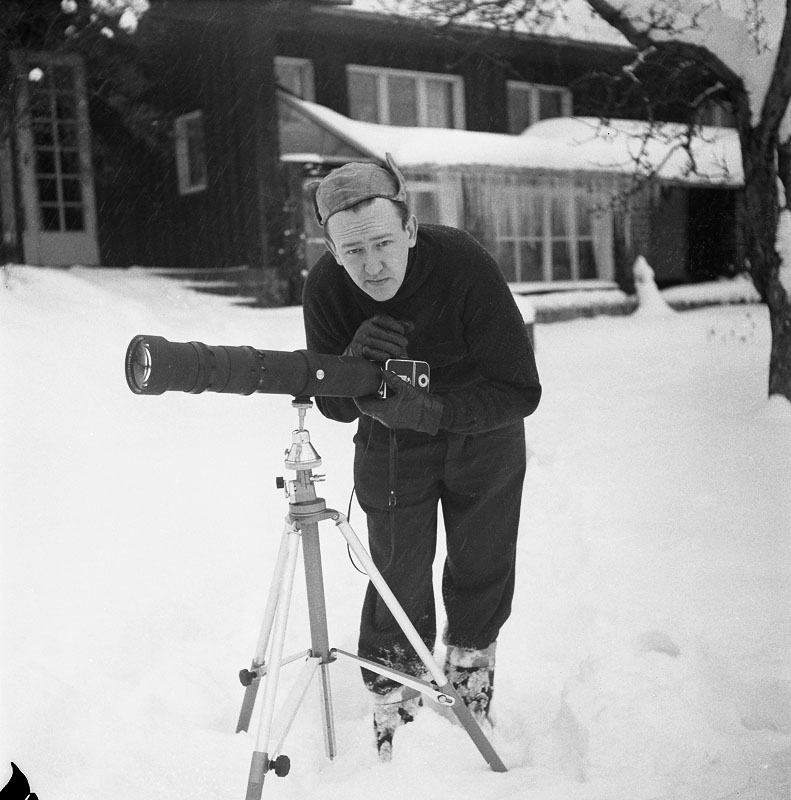
- Born: 7 July 1929; Rome
- Died: 25 May 2002 (aged 72)
- Occupation: Photographer

Inge Pål-Nils Nilsson (7 July 1929 – 25 May 2002), was a Swedish photographer and filmmaker active from the 1950s to the 1990s.

== Early life ==
Pål-Nils Nilsson was the son of sculptor Robert Nilsson (1894–1984) and celebrated textile artist Barbro Nilsson (1899–1983). After their marriage in 1928 the couple went abroad on a three-year artist scholarship, living mainly in Rome, where their son Pål-Nils Nilsson was born in 1929. Back in Sweden, the family lived in Stockholm. Summers were spent in Lerberget in the south of Höganäs, Robert Nilsson's home region.

== Professional photographer ==
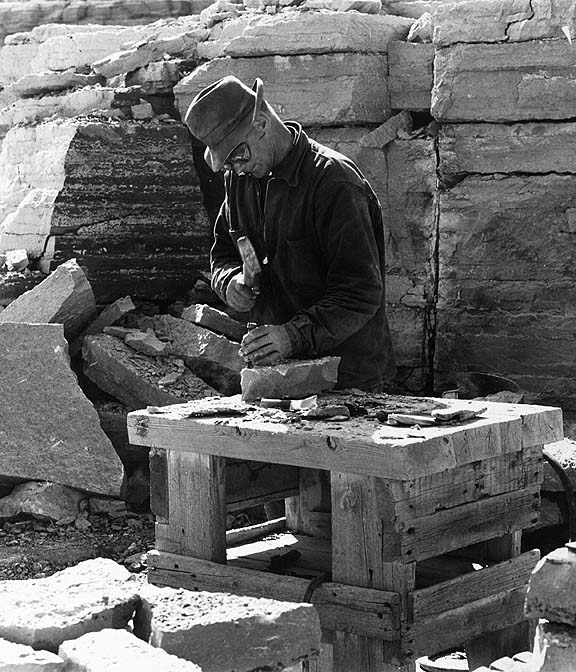
Pål-Nils Nilsson (c.1960) Stonemason

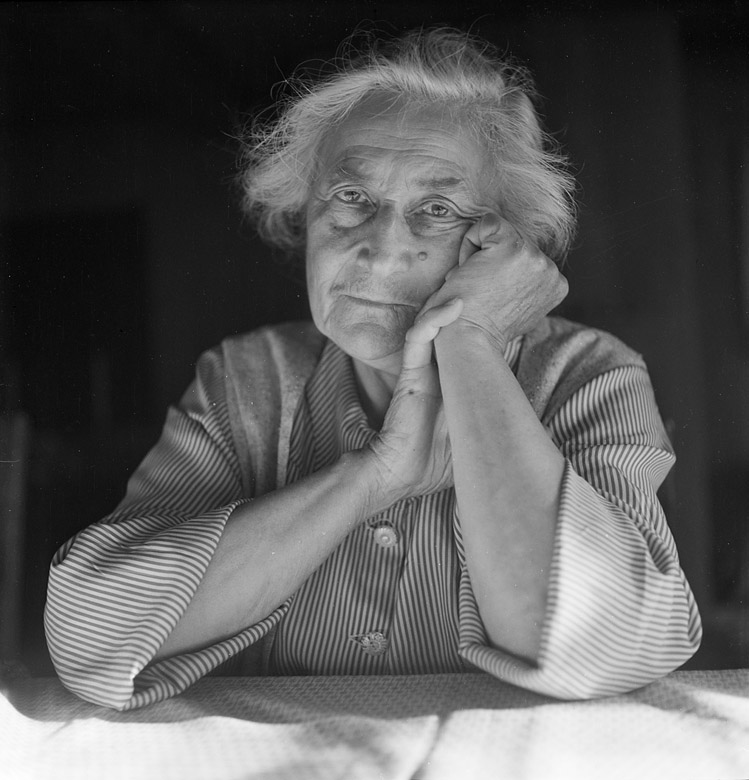
Pål-Nils Nilsson (1953) Painter and garden architect Emma Lundberg, grandmother of Pål-Nils Nilsson.

Nilsson started as an advertising photographer and with Sten Didrik Bellander (1921–2001), Harry Dittmar, Sven Gillsäter (1921–2001), Rune Hassner(1928–2003), Hans Malmberg (1927–1977), Georg Oddner(1923–2007), and Lennart Olson (1925–2010), Hans Hammarskiöld (1925–2012), Tore Johnson, and Hans Malmberg was a member of the professional collective Tio Fotografer ('Ten photographers') formed in 1958 and their subsequent photo agency Tiofoto. The group was influential in Swedish photography especially because among its members, Pål-Nils Nilsson, Hans Hammarskiöld, Rune Hassner, Georg Oddner and Lennart Olson held prominent positions in the educational and institutional spheres and they regularly exhibited at significant venues for photography, and the whole group was presented at the Hasselblad Centre in 1998, the year Nilsson became a professor of photography at the Fothögskolan in Gothenburg.

== Work and recognition ==
In particular, Nilsson has become famous for photos of Swedish landscapes and cultural environments and for his films for television. From 1955 for 30 years, he illustrated the Swedish Tourist Association's annual journals and other books. He worked on stories that promoted the interests of the minority group, the Sámi people of Lapland. His photographs of the reindeer round-up in Sweden were featured in The Times in 1965.

Edward Steichen included Nilsson in the world-touring Museum of Modern Art exhibition The Family of Man that was seen by 9 million visitors; it is a slow-shutter picture of a rapt young girl listening to a pianist amidst the swirling throng of an adult party. Nilsson was included in two other MoMA exhibitions; Postwar European Photography, 26 May – 23 August 1953, and Photographs from the Museum Collection, 26 November 1958 – 18 January 1959.

== Personal life ==
In 1954, at age 24, Nilsson married photographer Ingegärd Nanny Kristina Nilsson (1931–2002) who was born in Gothenburg, and they had two children. They divorced in 1973.

== Collections ==
- The Riksantikvarieämbetet has acquired 300,000 of Pål-Nils Nilsson's landscapes and cultural images for its Antiquarian-Topographical Archives
- The Royal Library has portraits and stock photographs by Pål-Nils Nilsson.
- Represented at the National Museum in Stockholm.

== Publications ==
- Jansson, Sven B. F. (Sven Birger Fredrik); Nilsson, Pål-Nils; Svenska turistföreningen (1980), Runstenar, Svenska turistföreningen, ISBN 978-91-7156-015-5
- Nilsson, P.-N. (1956). Landskap. From series: Vi fotograferar, Stockholm: Bonnier.
- Viggo Sten Møller: A book about Barbro Nilsson, with pictures by Pål-Nils Nilsson, Trevi, Stockholm 1977, ISBN 91-7160-299-2
- Vägval (projekt), Nilsson, P.-N., & Landstingsförbundet. (1991). Vägval: Hälso- och sjukvårdens övergripande strukturer och framtiden. Stockholm: Landstingsförb.
- Nilsson, P.-N., Reuterswärd, B., Reuterswärd, H., & Rädda barnen. (1988). Från barn till barn, fjärran syskon: Om barn i Peru till barn i Sverige : en berättelse hur det gick till när svenska barn samlade pengar till barn på Andernas högplatå. Stockholm: Rädda barnen. Lindström, P. (2008). Svart på vitt om Tio fotografer. Lund: Historiska media.
- Nilsson, P.-N., & Ruong, I. (1967). Duov'dagat ja bargot: Låkkamušat sámi-gillii. Stockholm: SÖ-förl.
- Nilsson, P.-N., Olson, L., Grünstein, D., Penn, I., Shore, S., Pare, R., Wiklund, P., ... Camera obscura. (1983). Camera obscura: 1983. Stockholm: Camera obscura.
- Nilsson, P.-N., & Hård, . S. U. (1963). Nordiska Galleriet: Nybrogatan 11, Stockholm ö, 67 05 55. Snekkersten: Mobilia.
- Jansson, S. B. F., Nilsson, P.-N., & Svenska turistföreningen. (1980). Runstenar. Stockholm: Svenska turistföreningen.
