= Egdean =

Village in West Sussex, England

Coordinates: 50.97006°N 0.57955°W

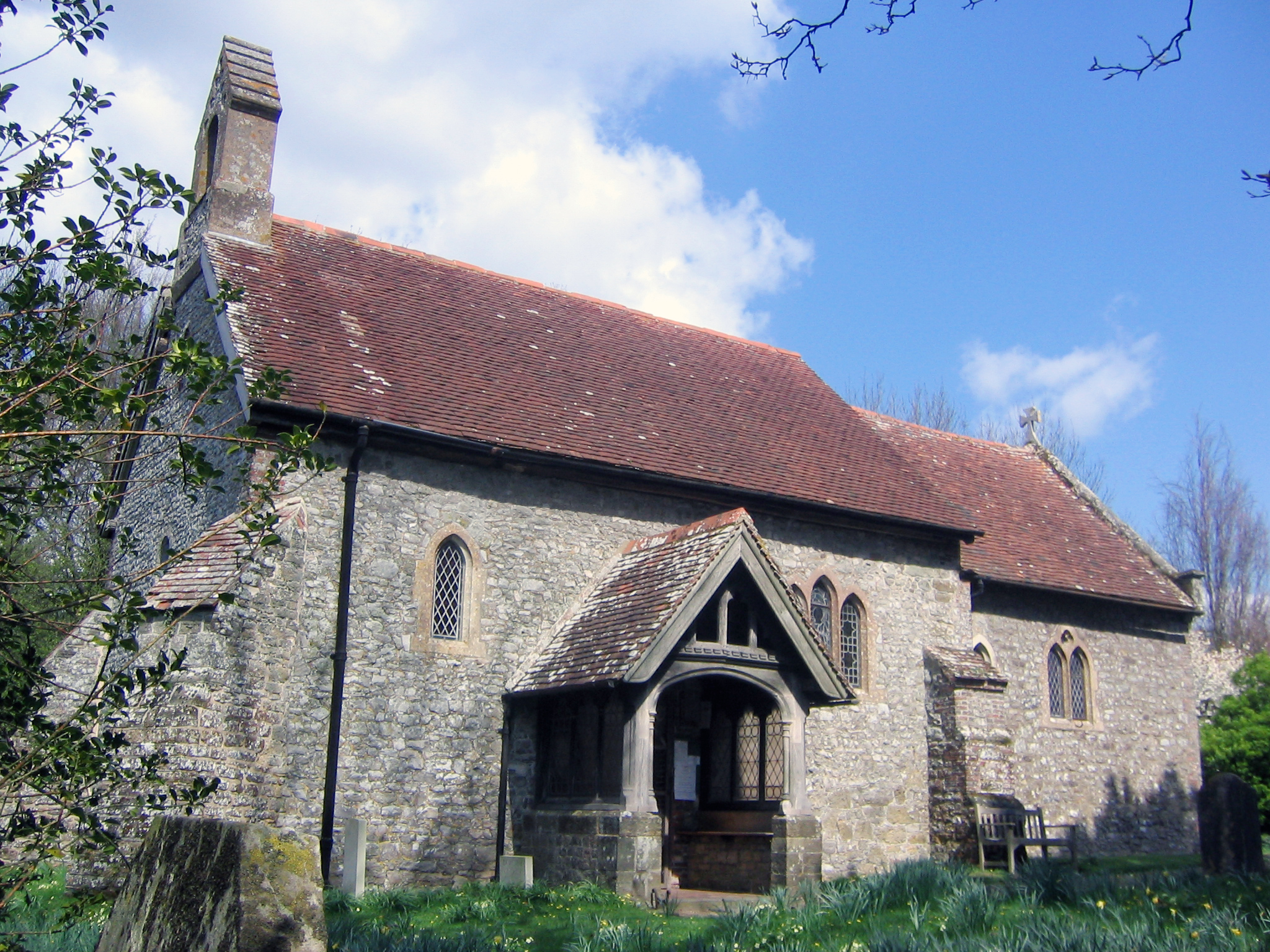
- Church of St. Bartholomew

- Location within West Sussex
- OS grid reference: SU998199
- Civil parish: Petworth
- District: Chichester
- Shire county: West Sussex
- Region: South East
- Country: England
- Sovereign state: United Kingdom
- Post town: Pulborough
- Postcode district: RH20 1
- Police: Sussex
- Fire: West Sussex
- Ambulance: South East Coast
- UK Parliament: Arundel and South Downs

Egdean (pronounced Egg-deen) is a small village in the civil parish of Petworth, in the Chichester district of West Sussex, England. It lies just off the A283 road 1.7 miles (2.8 km) southeast of Petworth. In 1931 the parish had a population of 82. On 1 April 1933 the parish was abolished and merged with Petworth.

In earlier centuries a horse fair was held at Egdean. It was one of the last occasions on which the 3rd Earl of Egremont was seen out in public before he died in 1837. The earl gave a £20 prize for the best three-year-old colt or filly.

The Anglican church of St Bartholomew, dating from the 16th century, is in regular use.
