= Mirosław Grabarczyk =

Polish chess grandmaster (born 1971)

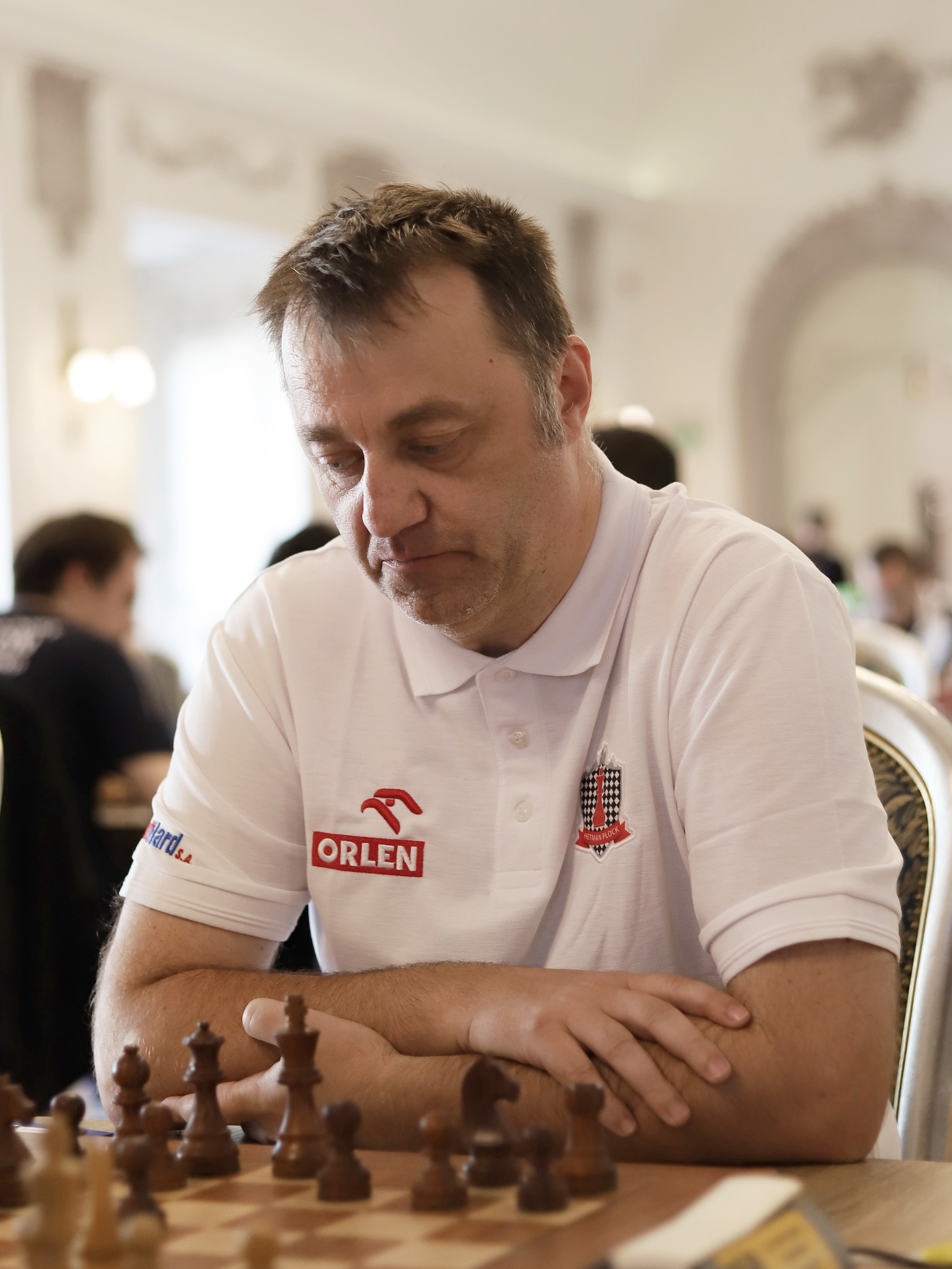
- Grabarczyk in 2021

Personal information
- Born: 3 January 1971 (age 55) Płock, Poland

Chess career
- Country: Poland
- Title: Grandmaster (2002)
- Peak rating: 2525 (July 1996)

Mirosław Grabarczyk (born 3 January 1971) is a Polish chess grandmaster.

== Chess career ==
Grabarczyk has been one of the leading Polish chess players since the 1990s. In 1993 and 1995 he finished second in the Polish Chess Championship. He won the Polish Blitz Chess Championship in 1994 and finished third in this event in 1993 and 2013. He finished second in the Polish Rapid Chess championship in 1995. He has also competed successfully in several Polish Team Chess Championships.

In 1996 Grabarczyk won two international tournaments in Polanica-Zdrój and Police. In 2009 he shared third place in the Scandinavian Open in Copenhagen. In 2014 he won the International Chess Championship Malopolska seniors and juniors in Kraków.

Grabarczyk played for Poland in the European Team Chess Championship:

- In 1997, at fourth board in the 11th European Team Chess Championship in Pula (+2, =5, -2),
- In 2001, at reserve board in the 13th European Team Chess Championship in León (+0, =3, -0).

== Personal life ==
Grabarczyk's brother Bogdan is also a well-known chess player who holds the FIDE International Master title (1998). In 1994, Bogdan finished second in the Polish Championship.
