= Ida (given name) =

Feminine given name

- Gender: Female

Origin
- Origin: Ancient Germanic

Other names
- Derived: Old Norse 'ið' meaning 'deed' or 'action'
- Related names: Iida, Idella

Ida is a feminine given name found in Europe and North America. It is popular in Scandinavian countries, where it is pronounced Ee-da.

The name has an ancient Germanic etymology, according to which it means ‘industrious’ or ‘prosperous’. It derives from the Germanic root id, meaning "labor, work" (also found in "Iði"). Alternatively, it may be related to the name of the Old Norse goddess Iðunn.

Ida also occurs as an anglicisation of the Irish feminine given name Íde.

Ida is a currently popular name in the Nordic countries and is among the top 20 names given to girls born in 2019 in Denmark. It was among the top 20 names for newborn girls in Norway in 2013 and among the top 50 names for newborn girls in Sweden in 2013. It was among the top 10 names for girls born to Swedish speaking families in Finland in 2013. Finnish variant Iida was among the top ten most popular names given to newborn girls in Finland in 2013.

Ida was at its height of popularity in the United States in the 1880s, when it ranked among the top ten names for girls. In an essay from Frank Leslie's Sunday Magazine written in 1887, Ida is a favored name meaning "God-like". It remained among the top 100 most popular names for girls there until 1930. It last ranked among the top 1,000 names for girls in the United States in 1986.

Notable people with the name include:

== People ==
- Ida Applebroog (1929–2023), American painter
- Ida A. T. Arms (1856–1931), American missionary-educator, temperance leader
- Ida Auken (born 1978), Danish Member of Parliament infamously known for her piece "Welcome to 2030"
- Ida Baccini (1850–1911), Italian children's author
- Ida Bachmann (1900–1995), Danish librarian and journalist
- Ida Barney (1886–1982), American astronomer
- Ida Bothe (fl. 1881–1890), German-American artist and educator
- Ida Botti Scifoni (1812–1844), Italian painter, sculptor and designer
- Ida Carloni Talli (1860–1940), Italian actress
- Ida Cook (1904–1986), British campaigner for Jewish refugees and romance novelist
- Ida Corr (born 1977), Danish singer and songwriter
- Ida, Countess of Boulogne (1160–1216), French noblewoman
- Ida M. Curran (1863–1948), American journalist and editor
- Ida Daly (1901–1985), American disability community leader
- Ida Wharton Dawson (1860–1928), American social worker and clubwoman
- Ida d'Este (1917–1976), Italian educator, partisan and politician
- Ida Di Benedetto (born 1945), Italian actress and film producer
- Ida Dixon (1854–1916), American golf course architect
- Ida Dwinger (born 1957), Danish actress
- Ida Horton East (1842–1915), American philanthropist
- Ida Ekeroth Clausson (born 1991), Swedish politician
- Ida Engberg (born 1984), Swedish techno DJ
- Ida Finney Mackrille (1867–1960), American suffragist and women's political leader in California
- Ida M. Flynn (1942–2004), American computer scientist, textbook author, and professor
- Ida Galli (born 1939), Italian actress
- Ida Genther Schmidt (1902–1999), American anatomist, medical college professor
- Ida Gomes (1923–2009), Polish-born Brazilian actress
- Ida Haendel (1928–2020), British violinist
- Ida Henriette da Fonseca (1802–1858), Danish opera singer
- Ida Hulkko (born 1998), Finnish swimmer
- Ida Jenshus (born 1987), Norwegian musician
- Ida Karlsson (born 2004), Swedish ice hockey player
- Ida Kleijnen (1936–2019), Dutch chef
- Ida Kors (born 1982), Swedish politician
- Ida Krehm (1912–1998), Canadian-American pianist
- Ida Kuoppala (born 2000), Finnish ice hockey player
- Ida Laurberg (born 2000), Danish singer and songwriter
- Ida Lewis (disambiguation), several people
- Ida Lien (born 1997), Norwegian biathlete
- Ida Marie Lipsius (1837–1927), German writer
- Ida Ljungqvist (born 1981), Swedish model
- Ida Loo-Talvari (1901–1997), Estonian opera singer
- Ida Dorothy Love (1908–1990), Australian nurse and midwifery educator
- Ida Lupino (1918–1995), American actress and film director
- Ida Malosi, lawyer and judge from New Zealand
- Ida Madsen (born 1994), Danish singer
- Ida Elizabeth Brandon Mathis (1857–1925), American businesswoman and farmers' advocate
- Ida McCain (1884–after 1937), American architect
- Ida McNeil (1888–1974), American broadcaster and flag designer
- Ida McQuesten (1869–1945), American politician
- Ida Mingle (1884–1948), American writer, teacher, faith healer
- Ida Møller (1872–1947), Danish operatic soprano
- Ida Nettleship (1877–1907), English artist
- Ida Göthilda Nilsson (1840–1920), Swedish sculptor
- Ida Nilsson (born 1981), Swedish trailrunner and ski mountaineer
- Ida Noddack (1896–1978), German scientist
- Ida Nowakowska (born 1990), Polish-American actress
- Ida Nudel (1931–2021), Russian refusenik
- Ida Odinga (born 1950), Kenyan businesswoman, activist and educator
- Ida of Bernicia (died 559), King of Bernicia
- Ida of Lorraine (1040–1113), French saint and noblewoman
- Ida of Nivelles (1190–1231), beatified Belgian Cistercian nun and mystic
- Ida Laura Pfeiffer (1797–1858), Austrian explorer and writer
- Ida Pinto-Sezzi (1852–????), Italian painter
- Ida von Plomgren (1870–1960) feminist, one of first Swedish women's foil fencing champions.
- Ida Praetorius, Danish ballerina
- Ida Quaiatti (1890–1962), Italian opera soprano
- Ida Redig (born 1987), Swedish singer, actress, music producer and songwriter
- Ida Rodríguez Prampolini (1925–2017), Mexican academic, art historian and cultural preservationist
- Ida Rubinstein (1885–1960), Russian ballet dancer
- Ida Mary Barry Ryan (1854–1917), American philanthropist
- Ida Sammis (1865–1943), American suffragist and politician
- Ida Saxton McKinley (1847–1907), American first lady and wife of President William McKinley
- Ida Schreiter (1912–1948), German concentration camp warden executed for war crimes
- Ida von Schulzenheim (1859–1940), Swedish painter
- Ida Scudder (1870–1960), American missionary
- Ida Sherman Jenne (1860–1934), American clubwoman and philanthropist
- Ida Silfverberg (1834–1899), Finnish painter
- Ida Štimac (born 2000), Croatian alpine skier
- Ida Tarbell (1857–1944), American journalist
- Ida Törnström 1862–1949, Swedish painter, poet
- Ida Vihuri (1882–1929), Finnish politician
- Ida Vitale (born 1923), Uruguayan poet, Miguel de Cervantes Prize 2018
- Ida von Boxberg (1806–1893), German-born archaeologist
- Ida B. Wells (1862–1931), American journalist and civil rights activist
- Ida L. White (fl. 1862–1901), Irish poet, also published simply as "Ida"
- Ida Wood (1838–1932), American recluse
- Ida Wyman (1926–2019), American photographer
- Iida Yrjö-Koskinen (1857–1937), Finnish politician

== Fictional characters ==
- Princess Ida, eponymous heroine of Gilbert and Sullivan's comic opera
- Ida Barlow, in the British television series Coronation Street
- Ida Blankenship, in the American television series Mad Men
- Ida Lowry, a character from the 1985 dystopian black comedy film film Brazil

== Other figures ==
- Ida, daughter of Corybas and mother of Minos, in Greek mythology
- Ida (goddess), a goddess in Hinduism

== See also ==
- Ida (disambiguation)
