= Ida =

Ida or IDA may refer to:

== Arts and media ==
=== Film and television ===
- ID:A, a 2011 Danish film
- Ida (film), a 2013 Polish film
- Ida Galaxy, a fictional galaxy in the Stargate TV series

=== Music ===
- Ida (band), a U.S. indie rock group
- Ida (singer), a Danish singer on X Factor

=== Other arts ===
- Ida (Middleverse), a fictional android librarian in comic books
- Ida (novel), 2017, by Alison Evans
- Princess Ida, the comic opera's eponymous fictional heroine

== Mythology and religion ==
=== Greek mythology ===
- Ida (mother of Minos), daughter of Corybas, the wife of Lycastus king of Crete, and the mother of the "second" king Minos of Crete
- Ida (nurse of Zeus), who along with her sister Adrasteia, nursed Zeus on Crete
- Mount Ida, a sacred mountain

=== Other religions ===
- Ila (Hinduism) or Idā, a Vedic goddess

== Businesses and organizations ==
=== Advocacy organizations ===
- In Defense of Animals, a non-profit organization for animal rights activism
- International Dark-Sky Association, a U.S.-based non-profit organization
- International Desalination Association, a global organization dedicated to desalination, desalination technology and water reuse
- International Disability Alliance, an international alliance of individuals to defend the rights of those with disabilities
- International Dispensary Association Foundation, a NGO dedicated to improving access to medications in the developing world
- International Documentary Association, a non-profit organization promoting documentary film, video and new media
- International Dyslexia Association, a non-profit education and advocacy organization

=== Industry and professional organizations ===
- Indian Dental Association
- Information Design Association
- Ingeniørforeningen i Danmark or Danish Society of Engineers, an association for engineers and others in technology
- Investment Dealers Association of Canada, now part of the Investment Industry Regulatory Organization of Canada

=== Research organizations ===
- Institute for Defense Analyses, a U.S. non-profit corporation that administers three federally funded research and development centers
- Issues Deliberation Australia/America, a public policy think tank based in South Australia and Texas
- International Desalination Association, a global organization dedicated to desalination, desalination technology and water reuse

=== Other businesses and organizations ===
- IDA Ireland, formerly the Industrial Development Authority
- I.D.A. (drug store), originally Independent Druggists' Alliance, a Canadian drug store
- Idaho Falls Regional Airport (IATA airport code IDA)
- Infocomm Development Authority of Singapore, a statutory board of the Singapore government
- International Depositary Authority, established by the Budapest Treaty for the deposit of biological material for the recognition of patents, such as the Microbial Culture Collection
- International Development Association of the World Bank Group
- Investment Delivery Authority, a government agency in New South Wales, Australia
- Islamic Democratic Alliance, aka Islami Jamhuri Ittihad, a defunct Pakistani electoral alliance

== People ==
- Ida (given name), including people so named
- Ida (surname), a list of people so named
- Ida (singer), a Danish singer on X Factor

== Places ==
=== Multiple places ===
- Mount Ida (disambiguation)

=== United States ===
- Ida, Arkansas, an unincorporated community
- Ida, Kentucky, an unincorporated community
- Ida, Louisiana, a village
- Ida County, Iowa
- Ida Township, Michigan
  - Ida, Michigan
- Ida Township, Douglas County, Minnesota
- Ida Lake, Shelby Township, Blue Earth County, Minnesota
- Ida, Virginia, an unincorporated community
- Ida., one of the abbreviations of Idaho

=== Other countries ===
- Ida Ridge, British Columbia, Canada
- Ida, a community in Cavan Monaghan Township, Ontario, Canada
- Ida (barony), in County Kilkenny, Ireland
- Ida, Nigeria, a railway station in Nigeria
- Ida (river), Slovakia
- Ida, Eastern Cape, a town in South Africa near Otto Du Plessis Pass
- Ida Valley, a locality in Central Otago, New Zealand
- Ida, Vologda Oblast, Russia
- Ida, Russia, a list of rural localities

== Science and technology ==
=== Astronomy ===
- Ida Facula, a mountain on Amalthea, a moon of Jupiter
- 243 Ida, an asteroid
- International Docking Adapter, a docking adapter for the International Space Station

=== Computing ===
- Intel Dynamic Acceleration, a technology for increasing single-threaded performance on multi-core processors
- Interactive Disassembler (now IDA Pro), a popular software disassembler tool for reverse engineering
- IDA*, an iterative deepening depth-first search algorithm
- Interactive Data Analysis, a software package for SPSS
- Interchange of Data across Administrations (IDA), a predecessor programme to the IDABC in European eGovernment

=== Biology and medicine ===
- 3,4-Isopropylidenedioxyamphetamine, an amphetamine drug
- Ida (plant), a genus in the family Orchidaceae
- Iminodiacetic acid, a dicarboxylic acid amine
- Intradural anesthesia or spinal anaesthesia
- Iron-deficiency anemia
- Ida, a fossil of the early primate genus Darwinius, species Darwinius masillae

=== Other uses in science and technology ===
- Incremental Dynamic Analysis, a method for assessing the seismic behavior of structures
- Industrial Denatured Alcohol
- Isotope dilution analysis

== Other uses ==
- List of storms named Ida
- Ida (sword), a type of sword used by the Yoruba people
- Ida (yoga), a Nadi in Indian medicine and yoga
- USS Ida (1863), a Union Navy steamer of the American Civil War
- Individual Development Account, an asset building tool for low-income families
- Idaho Falls Regional Airport (IATA airport code IDA)
- Idaxo-Isuxa-Tiriki language (ISO 639-3 code "ida")

== See also ==
- Idas (disambiguation)
- Ita (disambiguation)
- Itta (592–652), wife of Pepin of Landen and mother of Saint Begga
