= Silfverberg =

Silfverberg is a surname. Notable people with the surname include:

- Anna Willcox-Silfverberg (born 1992), New Zealand freestyle skier and television reporter
- Hans Silfverberg (born 1943), Finnish entomologist
- Ida Silfverberg (1834–1899), Finnish painter
- Jakob Silfverberg (born 1990), Swedish ice hockey player
- Jan-Erik Silfverberg (born 1953), Swedish ice hockey player
- Karl Silfverberg (1899–1978), Swedish Air Force major general
