= Ida, Russia =

Ida (Russian: Ида) is the name of several rural localities in Russia:

- Ida, Irkutsk Oblast, a settlement in Bokhansky District of Irkutsk Oblast
- Ida, Vologda Oblast, a settlement in Idsky Selsoviet of Gryazovetsky District of Vologda Oblast

== See also ==
- Ida (disambiguation)
