= Mingle =

Mingle may refer to:

- Mingle, agile project management software developed by Thoughtworks
- Mingle, a game played in the TV series Squid Game season 2
- Alex Mingle (born 1948), Ghanaian footballer
- Ida Mingle (1884–1948), American New Thought writer, teacher, and faith healer

== See also ==
- Mingles, a British confectionery
- Mingles (restaurant), Seoul, South Korea
