= Roxane Cohen Silver =

Health psychologist

- Occupations: Vice Provost & Distinguished Professor of Psychological Science
- Awards: APA Distinguished Service to Psychological Science (2007); APA Distinguished Contributions to Psychology in the Public Interest (2011)

Academic background
- Education: Northwestern University

Academic work
- Institutions: University of California, Irvine

Roxane Cohen Silver (born August 1955) is a social, health psychologist known for her work on personal, national, and international traumas and how people cope with these traumas. She holds the position of Vice Provost for Academic Planning & Institutional Research and Distinguished Professor of Psychological Science, Public Health, and Medicine at the University of California, Irvine.

Silver is the Past-President of the Federation of Associations in Behavioral and Brain Sciences. She has served on the U.S. Department of Homeland Security's Homeland Security Advisory Council and on the Board of Directors of Psychology Beyond Borders, a nonprofit organization focused on disaster relief.

== Awards ==
In 2024 Silver was elected a member of the American Academy of Arts & Sciences. Silver received the American Psychological Association (APA) Award for Distinguished Service to Psychological Science in 2007. She was awarded the Public Advocacy Award from the International Society for Traumatic Stress Studies in 2010 for "outstanding and fundamental contributions to advancing social understanding of trauma". In 2011, she received both the American Psychological Association Award for Distinguished Contributions to Psychology in the Public Interest and the Award for Outstanding Service to the Field of Trauma Psychology (APA, Division 56, Trauma Psychology).

== Biography ==
At age 17, Silver discovered a career path for herself in psychology. Her close friend's father was diagnosed with a brain tumor and died within three months of his diagnosis. Since her friend was only a teenager, it was hard to cope with the loss. This event triggered Silver's interest in how people cope with traumatic events and she turned to psychology as her career choice.

Silver received her B.A. degree in psychology with highest distinction and honors at Northwestern University in 1976. She continued her education at Northwestern, graduating in 1982 with a Ph.D. in social psychology. As an undergraduate and graduate student, Silver worked with Philip Brickman, whose suicide profoundly influenced her thinking about how people cope with traumatic events. Silver's dissertation, supervised by Camille Wortman, was titled Coping with an undesirable life event: A study of early reactions to physical disability.

Silver's research on coping and adjustment in response to traumatic events and natural disasters has been funded by the National Science Foundation.

== Research ==
Silver's research team studies how people cope with traumatic life events. She was the Principal Investigator of a multi-year national project that studied the emotional impact of the September 11 attacks on people in the United States. She found that the attack caused long-term mental and physical health effects, including post-traumatic stress and increases in cardiovascular ailments. Silver also found that the traumatic stress was not limited to those who were in the area of the September 11 attacks; people throughout the nation were experiencing trauma from the attacks as well.

Silver's studies examined how social constraints on discussions of a traumatic experience can interfere with cognitive processing of and recovery from loss, and have explored associations between intrusive thoughts and depressive symptoms. In one of her well-publicized longitudinal studies, Silver and her colleagues examined resilience among people who had had to cope with negative events such as natural disasters, divorce, a recent death, or illness. They observed that people who were going through difficult personal events often learned ways to ease the pain of traumatic stress and actually had higher life satisfaction and lower distress than people who had no history of adversity.

Silver has collaborated with other psychologists in studying people's mental health during the COVID-19 pandemic. The researchers examined stress and depressive symptoms that people began experiencing at the beginning of March 2020 and how they coped with the deaths of family members and friends caused by COVID-19. The researchers concluded that the media's continuous coverage of COVID-19 increased stress and anxiety. After studying how people dealt with depression and anxiety due to COVID-19, Silver and her colleagues concluded that technology use during this time helped promote mental health. The authors emphasized that reaching out to friends, family, and/or professionals to discuss emotions and thoughts were effective ways of coping and improving mental health during this time.

== Books ==
- Friedman, H. S., & Silver, R. C. (Eds.). (2007). Foundations of health psychology. Oxford University Press.
- Silver, R. C., & Updegraff, J. A. (2013). Searching for and finding meaning following personal and collective traumas. American Psychological Association.
