= Camille Wortman =

Clinical health psychologist

- Occupation: Professor of Social Health Psychology
- Spouse: Paul Wortman
- Awards: APA Distinguished Scientific Award for an Early Career Contribution in Psychology (1980)

Academic background
- Education: Carnegie Institute of Technology, Duke University

Camille B. Wortman (born July 2, 1947) is a clinical health psychologist and expert on grief and coping in response to traumatic events and loss. She is an Emeritus Professor of Psychology at Stony Brook University.

Wortman received the American Psychological Association Distinguished Scientific Award for an Early Career Contribution in Social Psychology in 1980, in recognition of her research "providing stimulating and influential analyses of how people react to uncontrollable outcomes and cope with undesirable life events." She was the recipient of a joint award from the APA Science Directorate and the National Science Foundation recognizing the achievements of women in science.

== Biography ==
Wortman was born in a small town near Pittsburgh, Pennsylvania. She had no plans of pursuing academics until she was accepted into Carnegie Institute of Technology in 1965. Wortman enrolled in Daryl Bem's social psychology course and was given a summer research assistantship at the college through him, thus beginning her career in psychology. Around this time, she also met her future husband Paul Wortman, a graduate student in psychology at Carnegie Institute of Technology.

When Paul obtained a faculty position at Duke University, Wortman transferred to Duke, graduating with her Bachelor's degree summa cum laude in 1969. Wortman was accepted into the social psychology program at Duke University, and graduated with a M.A. in 1970 and a PhD in 1972. At Duke, Wortman was mentored by Jack Brehm and Ned Jones. With Brehm, she engaged in research on psychological reactance and learned helplessness, exploring how people cope with situations or outcomes over which they have no control. According to their model, people tend to exhibit reactance (and enhanced performance) when subjected to minor failures or adverse events, but are more likely to exhibit helplessness (and poor performance) when subjected to major failures or adversities.

Wortman and her husband joined the faculty of psychology at Northwestern University in 1972. At Northwestern, she conducted research on coping in response to severe accidents that resulted in spinal cord injury and paralysis, collaborating with her colleagues, Ronnie Janoff-Bulman, Philip Brickman, and others, on studies of how people make attributions of blame.

Wortman, along with her husband, was on the faculty of the University of Michigan before moving to Stony Brook University in 1990. Her research program on stress and mental health of physicians was supported by the National Institute of Mental Health. Her work on bereavement was funded the National Institute on Aging.

== Research ==
Wortman's research career has focused on how humans deal with adverse life events and their experiences of grief and bereavement when losing a loved one. Wortman emphasized the need to "expand our notions of what is a normal reaction to loss." In collaboration with Roxane Cohen Silver, Wortman wrote critical papers on the myths of coping with loss. Their research findings ran counter to the view that mentally healthy people must experience distress after the loss of a loved one. It is common for friends or family members to believe that an individual who does not undergo distress is a cold and unloving person, and therapists may claim that the individual who is not experiencing distress is in denial of their circumstances. However, the longitudinal research of Wortman and her collaborators clearly showed that people have different trajectories and varied ways of grieving.

In one line of her research, Wortman focused on cancer patients, their physicians, and caregivers, and how interpersonal relationships and social supports helped people cope with terminal illness. Counter to the Wortman–Brehm model and its emphasis on hopelessness, Wortman found that people often can find meaning in tragic events and recover from trauma and grief. Wortman's work has sparked interest on how to create effective interventions for people impacted by crisis. In response to the COVID-19 pandemic, Wortman created a list of resources to help people coping with the deaths of their loved ones.

== Books ==
- Carr, D. S., Nesse, R. M., & Wortman, C. B. (Eds.). (2005). Spousal bereavement in late life. Springer Publishing Company.
- Jones, E. E., & Wortman, C. B. (1973). Ingratiation: An attributional approach. Morristown, N.J: General Learning Press.
- Pearlman, L. A., Wortman, C. B., Feuer, C. A., Farber, C. H., & Rando, T. A. (2014). Treating traumatic bereavement: A practitioner's guide. Guilford Publications.
- Wortman, C. B., Loftus, E. F., & Marshall, M. E. (1981). Psychology. Alfred and Knopf.
