= Idas (disambiguation) =

Idas is a Messenian prince in Greek mythology.

Idas or IDAS may also refer to:

- Idas (bivalve), a genus of molluscs
- IDAS (missile)
- Idas (mythology), several figures
- Rivière à Idas (English: Idas River), in Quebec, Canada
- Idas (crater), a crater on Saturn's moon Janus
- IDAS, an indoor distributed antenna system
- Indian Defence Accounts Service, provides financial and audit services to the Indian defence services
- International Design school for Advanced Studies, Hongik University, Seoul, South Korea
- Initial D Arcade Stage, arcade games based on the Initial D manga and anime

== See also ==
- Ida (disambiguation)
