= Jakob Silfverberg =

Swedish ice hockey player (born 1990)

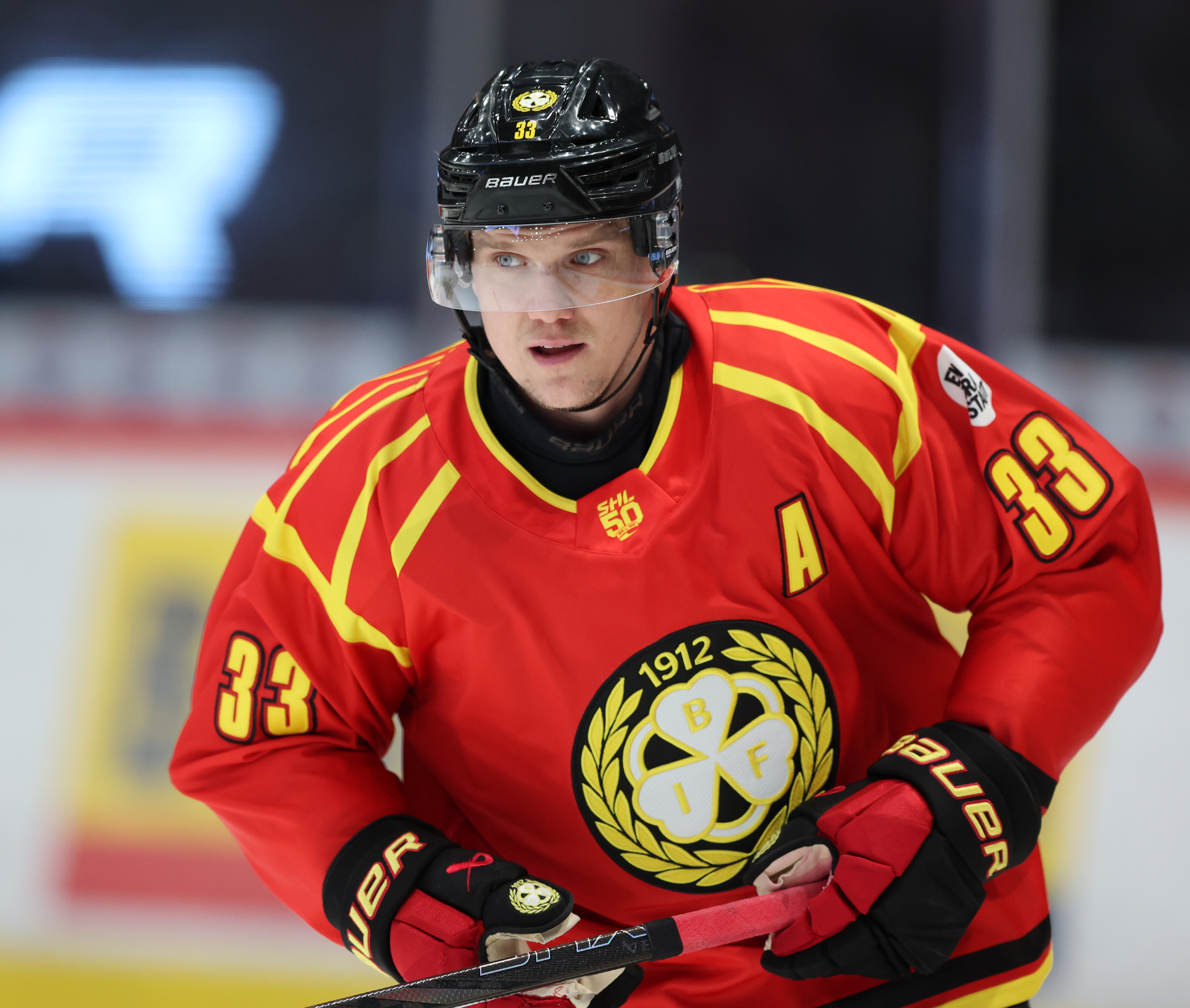
- Silfverberg with Brynäs IF in February 2026
- Born: 13 October 1990 (age 35) Gävle, Sweden
- Height: 188 cm (6 ft 2 in)
- Weight: 94 kg (207 lb; 14 st 11 lb)
- Position: Right wing
- Shoots: Right
- SHL team Former teams: Brynäs IF; Ottawa Senators; Anaheim Ducks
- National team: Sweden
- NHL draft: 39th overall, 2009; Ottawa Senators
- Playing career: 2008–present

Jakob Erik Silfverberg (born 13 October 1990) is a Swedish professional ice hockey player who is a winger for Brynäs IF of the Swedish Hockey League (SHL). He previously played for the Anaheim Ducks and for the Ottawa Senators of the National Hockey League (NHL). He was drafted in the second round, 39th overall, by the Ottawa Senators in the 2009 NHL entry draft. He has played for the Sweden's national team on multiple occasions, earning bronze and silver medals. He won the Swedish championship in 2012 with Brynäs.

== Playing career ==
=== Brynäs IF (2008–2012) ===
Silfverberg began his professional playing career in the Swedish Elitserien (now called the SHL) with Brynäs IF in the 2008–09 season. In the 2010–11 season, Silfverberg led the team in goals with 18 goals. He finished the season setting a then career-high in goals (18) and 34 points in 53 games, finishing third on the team in scoring. In the 2011–12 season, Silfverberg was named the winner of the Guldhjälmen award as the most valuable player (MVP), as voted by the players in the league, for the regular season, as well as the Guldpucken as player of the year. He finished the regular season with 24 goals and 54 points in 49 games, ranking second in the Elitserien scoring race behind Robert Rosén of AIK, who scored 21 goals and 39 assists for 60 points.

Silfverberg's offensive success continued in the Elitserien playoffs, and his production was a large factor in Brynäs' eventual Swedish championship title, scoring 13 goals and seven assists for 20 points. His 13 goals set a new record for total goals scored by a single player in the playoffs, surpassing Daniel Alfredsson's previous record of 12 goals set in the 2004–05 season. Ultimately, Silfverberg was also awarded the Stefan Liv Memorial Trophy as the MVP of the playoffs. During the semifinals, Silfverberg took over the role as the captain of Brynäs, following Andreas Dackell's retirement due to a knee injury. He also wore the number 100 on his jersey during the second half of the season, in honor of Brynäs' 100th anniversary (the club was founded in 1912).

=== Ottawa Senators (2012–2013) ===
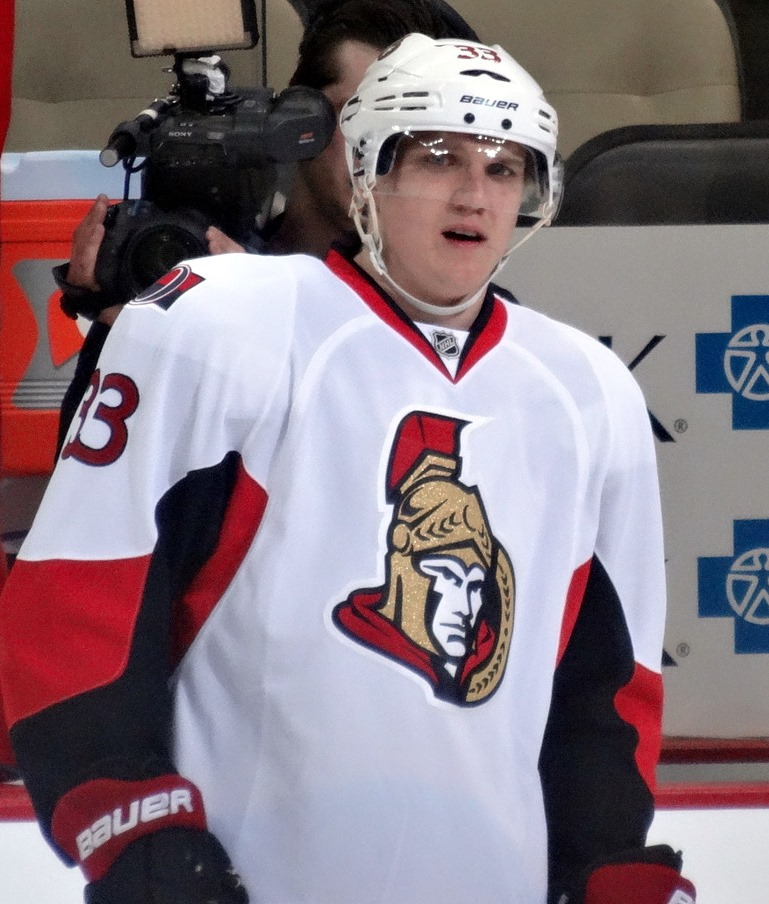
Silfverberg with the Ottawa Senators in May 2013

Silfverberg was drafted by the Ottawa Senators of the National Hockey League (NHL) in the second round of the 2009 NHL entry draft, 39th overall. On 30 May 2011, he signed a three-year, entry-level contract with Ottawa. After the 2012 Elitserien playoffs concluded, Silfverberg joined the Ottawa Senators for their run in the 2012 Stanley Cup playoffs. He made his NHL, as well as his Stanley Cup playoff, debut on 23 April 2012, in Game 6 of the Eastern Conference quarterfinals series against the New York Rangers. Registering nine minutes of ice time, Silfverberg recorded one shot on goal in the Senators' 3–2 loss. The Senators were eliminated from the playoffs in Game 7 of the series.

The next season was postponed due to the 2012–13 NHL lockout and Silfverberg was sent to Ottawa's American Hockey League (AHL) affiliate, the Binghamton Senators to start the 2012–13 season. In the second Senators game after the resolution of the lockout, Silfverberg scored his first career NHL goal on 21 January 2013, against José Théodore of the Florida Panthers in a 4–0 win. He scored twice against Ondřej Pavelec of the Winnipeg Jets on 17 March in a 4–1 win. He finished his rookie season with ten goals and 19 points in 48 games.

=== Anaheim Ducks (2013–2024) ===
On 5 July 2013, Silfverberg was traded to the Anaheim Ducks, along with forward Stefan Noesen and a first-round draft pick in 2014, in exchange for forward Bobby Ryan. He made his debut in the opening game of the 2013–14 season against the Colorado Avalanche. Though the Avalanche won 6–1, that one goal for Anaheim was Silfverberg's first goal as a Duck. In his first season with Anaheim, Silfverberg scored ten goals and 23 points in 52 games.

On 15 August 2014, the Ducks announced they had re-signed Silfverberg as a restricted free agent to a one-year, $850,000 contract. During the 2014–15 season, he continued to increase his scoring numbers, recording 13 goals and 39 points. He scored only one goal in his first 27 games, then broke out for 11 goals in the next 43. He followed up this strong play with four goals and 18 points in 16 playoff games as the Ducks went to the Western Conference finals, where they were defeated by the Chicago Blackhawks.

On 7 August 2015, the Ducks signed Silfverberg a four-year contract extending until the 2018–19 season with an annual salary cap hit of $3.75 million. In the 2016–17 season, with a new coach, Randy Carlyle, Silfverberg set new career highs in goals with 23 and points with 49, playing alongside Ryan Kesler and Andrew Cogliano on the second line. On 15 March 2016, he scored his first NHL hat trick in a 7–1 win over the New Jersey Devils. Silfverberg scored two goals against the Colorado Avalanche in a 5–1 victory on 31 January 2017. During the 2017–18 season, he missed five games due to upper body injury, returning on 11 December 2017.

On 13 February 2019, Silfverberg scored the only goal in a 1–0 win over the Vancouver Canucks in general manager Bob Murray's coaching debut after Carlyle had been fired. On 20 February, the Ducks announced they had re-signed Silfverberg to a five-year contract worth $26.25 million and will carry an annual cap hit of $5.25 million. He set a career-high in goals with 24 in 73 games during the 2018–19 season. At the beginning of the 2019–20 season, Silfverberg was named an alternate captain for the Ducks. He was selected to play in the 2020 NHL All-Star Game as the Ducks' lone representative, as his scoring pace at the mid-point of the season set him on course to set new personal bests. However, he withdrew from playing in the game to attend the birth of his second child and was replaced by Max Pacioretty of the Vegas Golden Knights. He finished the season with 21 goals in 66 games.

During the pandemic-shortened 2020–21 season, Silfverberg scored eight goals and 16 points in 47 games. He suffered a season-ending hip injury in April that caused him to miss the remainder of the season. He returned for the 2021–22 season but struggled, scoring only one goal in his first 32 games and twelve points overall. On 21 March 2022, Silfverberg was ruled out with blood clots in his right leg, forcing him to miss two weeks. Silfverberg was healthy for the 2022–23 season, playing in 81 games, scoring ten goals and 26 points.

On 11 April 2024, Silfverberg announced that he would retire from the NHL at the end of the 2023–24 season.

=== Return to Brynäs IF (2024) ===
On 15 April 2024, Brynäs IF announced that Silfverberg had signed a two-year contract with the club. The contract was renewed for an additional season on 18 February 2026 and will thus expire at the end of the 2026–27 season.

== International play ==
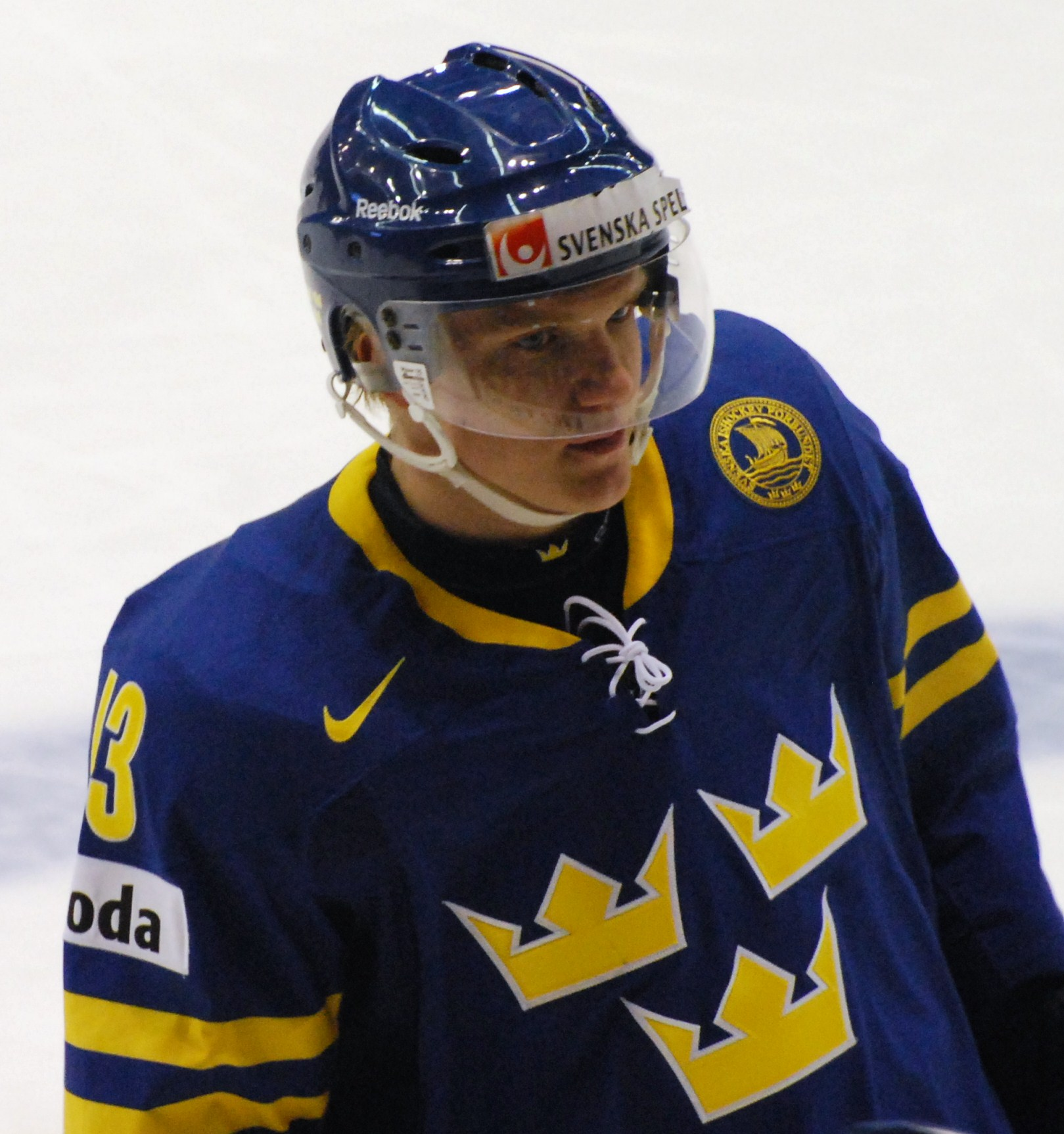
- Playing for Sweden at the 2010 World Junior Championships

Medal record

Men's ice hockey

Representing Sweden

Olympic Games
Silver medal – second place	2014 Sochi	

World Championships
Silver medal – second place	2011 Slovakia	

World Junior Championships
Bronze medal – third place	2010 Canada	

Silfverberg represented Sweden at the 2010 World Junior Championships held in Saskatchewan, Canada, scoring in the team's first game of the tournament. In the bronze medal game, he scored two goals in an 11–4 win over Switzerland. He also played for the Sweden squad for the 2011 IIHF World Championship, earning a silver medal in a 6–1 loss to Finland.

Silfverberg represented his country again at the 2012 World Championship, however Sweden was ousted in the quarterfinals by the Czech Republic. He returned for Team Sweden at the 2014 Winter Olympics in Sochi, Russia. Sweden won the silver medal, losing to Canada in a 3–0 shutout by Carey Price. Silfverberg was named to Sweden's team for the 2016 World Cup of Hockey. Sweden was eliminated in the semifinals by Team Europe.

== Personal life ==
Silfverberg's father, Jan-Erik, played defence with Brynäs IF for 11 seasons, winning four Swedish championships (in 1972, 1977, 1978 and 1980), as well as a World Championship silver medal in 1977. Jakob's uncle Conny also played for Brynäs for several seasons, also winning a Swedish championship in 1980 and scoring the most points in the 1984–85 Elitserien season. He married his wife in 2017, with whom he has two children.

== Career statistics ==
=== Regular season and playoffs ===
			Regular season					Playoffs
Season	Team	League	GP	G	A	Pts	PIM	GP	G	A	Pts	PIM
2006–07	Brynäs IF	J18 Allsv	14	3	8	11	6	3	0	0	0	0
2006–07	Brynäs IF	J20	6	1	3	4	0	—	—	—	—	—
2007–08	Brynäs IF	J18 Allsv	5	5	3	8	2	5	3	4	7	2
2007–08	Brynäs IF	J20	30	8	12	20	8	7	3	0	3	2
2008–09	Brynäs IF	J20	30	14	24	38	6	7	1	5	6	4
2008–09	Brynäs IF	SEL	16	3	1	4	2	4	0	0	0	2
2009–10	Brynäs IF	J20	1	1	1	2	0	3	3	2	5	0
2009–10	Brynäs IF	SEL	48	8	8	16	4	5	1	1	2	2
2010–11	Brynäs IF	SEL	53	18	16	34	16	5	0	4	4	2
2011–12	Brynäs IF	SEL	49	24	30	54	10	16	13	7	20	4
2011–12	Ottawa Senators	NHL	—	—	—	—	—	2	0	0	0	2
2012–13	Binghamton Senators	AHL	34	13	16	29	2	—	—	—	—	—
2012–13	Ottawa Senators	NHL	48	10	9	19	12	10	2	2	4	2
2013–14	Anaheim Ducks	NHL	52	10	13	23	12	13	2	0	2	4
2014–15	Anaheim Ducks	NHL	81	13	26	39	24	16	4	14	18	16
2015–16	Anaheim Ducks	NHL	82	20	19	39	32	7	0	5	5	6
2016–17	Anaheim Ducks	NHL	79	23	26	49	20	17	9	5	14	6
2017–18	Anaheim Ducks	NHL	77	17	23	40	18	4	1	1	2	2
2018–19	Anaheim Ducks	NHL	73	24	19	43	28	—	—	—	—	—
2019–20	Anaheim Ducks	NHL	66	21	18	39	14	—	—	—	—	—
2020–21	Anaheim Ducks	NHL	47	8	8	16	18	—	—	—	—	—
2021–22	Anaheim Ducks	NHL	53	5	16	21	30	—	—	—	—	—
2022–23	Anaheim Ducks	NHL	81	10	16	26	32	—	—	—	—	—
2023–24	Anaheim Ducks	NHL	81	7	12	19	24	—	—	—	—	—
2024–25	Brynäs IF	SHL	52	23	24	47	0	17	7	6	13	2
2025–26	Brynäs IF	SHL	52	20	23	43	44	5	3	1	4	0
SHL totals			270	96	102	198	76	53	24	19	43	12
NHL totals			820	168	205	373	264	69	18	27	45	38

=== International ===
Year	Team	Event	Result	GP	G	A	Pts	PIM
2007	Sweden	IH18	1st place, gold medalist(s)	4	1	0	1	2
2008	Sweden	WJC18	4th	5	1	2	3	2
2010	Sweden	WJC	3rd place, bronze medalist(s)	6	3	2	5	0
2011	Sweden	WC	2nd place, silver medalist(s)	9	0	1	1	2
2012	Sweden	WC	6th	8	2	0	2	2
2014	Sweden	OG	2nd place, silver medalist(s)	6	0	1	1	2
2016	Sweden	WCH	3rd	4	0	0	0	2
2023	Sweden	WC	6th	8	0	0	0	0
2026	Sweden	WC	7th	8	2	0	2	4
Junior totals				15	5	4	9	4
Senior totals				35	4	2	6	10

== Awards and honors ==
Award	Year	Ref
NHL
NHL All-Star Game	2020	

Awards and achievements
Preceded by Magnus Johansson	Winner of the Guldhjälmen; 2012	Succeeded by Bud Holloway
Preceded by Viktor Fasth	Winner of the Guldpucken; 2012	Succeeded by Jimmie Ericsson
Preceded by Anders Bastiansen	Winner of the Stefan Liv Memorial Trophy; 2012	Succeeded by Oscar Lindberg
