= Mount Ida (disambiguation) =

Mount Ida, in Greek mythology, can refer to either of two mountains considered sacred:

- Mount Ida (Crete)
- Mount Ida (Turkey) or Phrygian Ida

Mount Ida may also refer to:

== Mountains ==
- Mount Ida (Antarctica)
- Mount Ida, Tasmania, Australia, first ascended by a party that included Evelyn Temple Emmett
- Mount Ida, Heathcote, Victoria, Australia
- Mount Ida (Continental Ranges), British Columbia, Canada
- Mount Ida (Shuswap Highland), British Columbia, Canada
- Mount Ida (Colorado), United States
- Mount Ida (United Kingdom)

== Places ==
=== United States ===
- Mount Ida, Arkansas
- Mount Ida (Davenport, Iowa), a neighborhood that borders the Prospect Park Historic District
- Mont Ida, Kansas
- Mount Ida, Wisconsin, a town
  - Mount Ida (community), Wisconsin, an unincorporated community in the town
- Mount Ida Plantation, a former plantation in Talladega County, Alabama
- Mt Ida (Ellicott City, Maryland), a historic home
- Mount Ida (Scottsville, Virginia), a historic home

=== Elsewhere ===
- Mount Ida, Western Australia, an abandoned town
- Mount Ida (New Zealand electorate), a community and electorate

== Other uses ==
- Mount Ida College, in Newton, Massachusetts
- Mount Ida Gold Mine, a gold mine in Western Australia

== See also ==
- Ida Ridge, an eroded cinder cone in east-central British Columbia, Canada
