= Ida Pinto-Sezzi =

Italian painter

Ida Pinto-Sezzi (1852 in Florence – ?) was an Italian painter.

She was a resident of Florence. At the 1882 Promotrice, she exhibited Ciociara; in 1887, A Friar Cook. In 1887 at Venice, she exhibited La Zingara, depicting a fortune-telling gypsy woman. She also painted a number of landscapes. In 1889, she displayed at the Florentine Società Promotrice of Fine Arts a terracotta amphora painted with figures and landscapes. At the Mostra Beatrice, held in Florence in 1890, she won a silver medal for her work. A portrait of the Queen Magherita of Savoy by Ida Pinto is kept in the "patrimonio del Quirinale" in Rome. This portrait was exhibited in Villa Regina Margherita in Bordighera in the exhibition "Margherita Regina d'arte e cultura".
