= Ida Lewis (disambiguation) =

Ida Lewis (1842–1911) was an American lighthouse keeper,

Ida Lewis may also refer to:

- Ida E. Lewis (born 1934), American journalist
- Ida Lewis (actress) (1848–1935), American actress
- Julia Arthur (1869–1959), born Ida Lewis, Canadian actress
