= Ida M. Curran =

American journalist and editor (1863–1948)

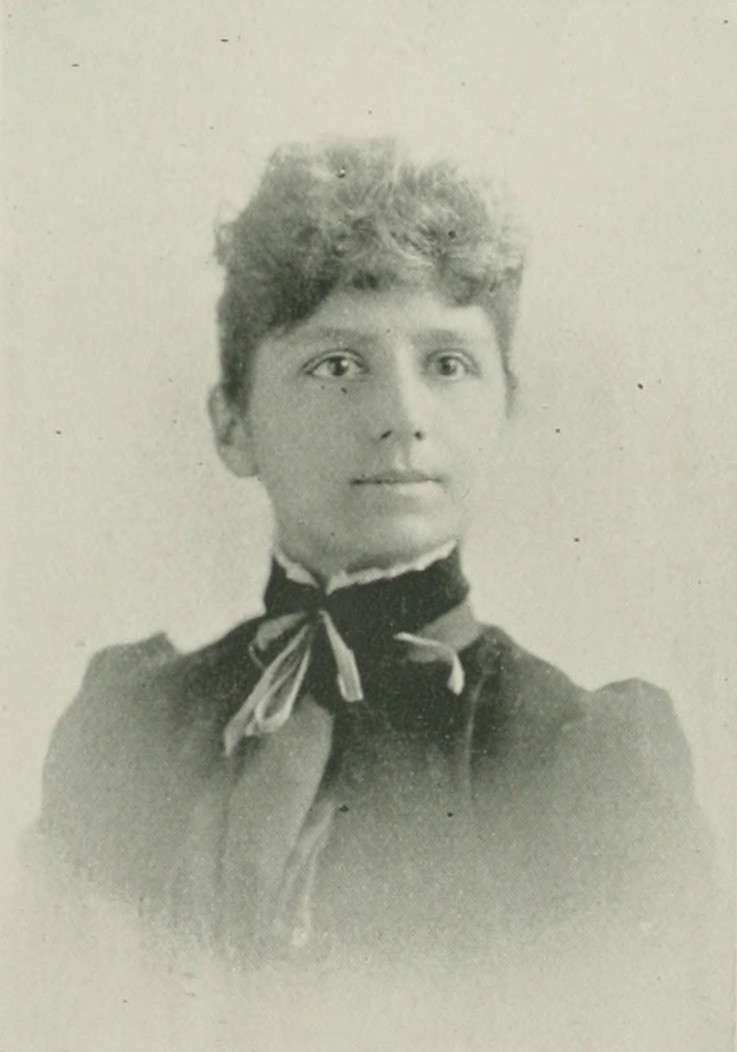
- Born: 1863; Waterbury, Vermont
- Died: January 24, 1948 (aged 84–85); Fresno, California
- Occupation(s): Journalist and editor
- Known for: Woburn City Press

Ida M. Graeber Curran (1863 – January 24, 1948) was an American journalist and editor.

== Early life ==
Ida M. Graeber was an only child born in Waterbury, Vermont. When a child, her family moved to Boston and afterwards to Woburn, Massachusetts.

She early showed a marked talent for literary work, and at school won her highest standing in rhetoric and literature. This proficiency in composition gained for her one of the four class honors in the Woburn high school when she graduated.

== Career ==
As a journalist, Ida M. Curran contributed largely to the Grattan Echo.

Household duties and three children compelled Curran to withdraw for a time from literary labors, but in 1888 she once more became associated with newspaper work, her articles appearing in the Woburn City Press, of which journal she assumed entire control in 1890. The publication belonged to her husband, who was a busy lawyer, and who wanted to sell the paper, but Curran offered to take charge of The Press herself.

Curran admitted in a newspaper story titled "a pretty female editor" that appeared in The Topeka Daily Capital in 1890, that her husband wrote the editorials for the City Press but that she created the remainder of the paper herself. Curran was a member of the New England Woman's Press Association.

She was an accomplished violinist and an amateur actress.

== Personal life ==
Ida M. Curran married Francis A. Curran, the publisher of the Grattan Echo and later owner of the Woburn City Press.

She died on January 24, 1948, in Fresno, California from a stroke.
