= Ida (surname) =

Ida is a surname. Notable people with the surname include:

- Antoinette Nana Djimou Ida (born 1985), French-Cameroonian heptathlete
- Erika Ida (井田 恵里香; born 1994), Japanese cricketer
- Ibrahim M. Ida (born 1949), Nigerian politician
- James Ida (born 1940), New York gangster
- Joseph Ida (1890–?), American gangster and head of the Philadelphia mob in the 1940s and 1950s
- Masataka Ida (井田 正孝; 1912–2004), Japanese lieutenant colonel who conspired to overthrow the government near the end of World War II
- Rina Ida (井田 莉菜; born 1991), Japanese curler

== Fictional characters ==
- Kyoya Ida, the main character of Ice Blade (Jiraishin): see List of Ice Blade characters
- Tenya Ida (飯田 天哉), a character in the manga and anime series My Hero Academia
- Tensei Ida (飯田 天睛), a character in the manga and anime series My Hero Academia
