= USS Ida =

Gunboat of the United States Navy

Coordinates: 30.67°N 88.03°W

History

United States
- Cost: $20,000
- Laid down: date unknown
- Launched: date unknown
- Acquired: 6 March 1863
- In service: 1863
- Out of service: 1865
- Stricken: 1865 (est.)
- Fate: Struck a mine and sank, 1865

General characteristics
- Displacement: 104 tons
- Length: not known
- Beam: not known
- Draught: not known
- Propulsion: steam engine; screw-propelled
- Speed: not known
- Complement: not known
- Armament: one gun; two smoothbore howitzers

USS Ida was a steamer acquired by the Union Navy during the American Civil War. She was used as a towboat and dispatch boat by the Navy, and she provided her services to ships in the blockade squadrons.

Ida was chartered by the Navy in New Orleans, Louisiana, 3 February 1863 and purchased 6 March.

== Assignment ==
She was assigned to the mortar flotilla for use as a dispatch vessel and for towing the motor boats in the swift and tricky currents of the Mississippi River. She operated primarily below Port Hudson, Louisiana, maintaining communication between the flotilla and the squadron flagship. She was also used commandeering and towing off any boats suitable for military use found in the river.

She came under fire while assisting Iberville 3 July but avoided damage. After Port Hudson fell 9 July clearing the entire Mississippi River for Union shipping, Ida continued to operate in the lower river towing oceangoing vessels between the mouth of the river and New Orleans.

Early in 1865, she was ordered to Mobile Bay, where she arrived 1 February. Two weeks later she took on board two smoothbore howitzers in preparation for picket duty.

== Sinking ==
While clearing the main channel of Mobile Bay, Ida struck a torpedo which crushed the timbers on her starboard side, burst her boilers, and tore up her decks on 13 April 1865. In a few moments, she flooded and sank in mid-channel. Three members of her crew were killed and two were wounded. Her wrecked hull was sold 11 September 1865.
