= Ida, Irkutsk Oblast =

Ida Ида
- Village
- Location within Irkutsk Oblast Location within Russia
- Coordinates: 53°18′N 104°29′E
- Country: Russia
- Region: Irkutsk Oblast
- District: Bokhansky District
- Time zone: UTC+8:00

Ida (Russian: Ида) is a rural locality (a settlement) in Bokhansky District, Irkutsk Oblast, Russia. Population: 34 (2010 census);

== Geography ==
This rural locality is located 51 kilometres (32 mi) from Bokhan (the district's administrative centre), 114 kilometres (71 mi) from Irkutsk (capital of Irkutsk Oblast) and 4,452 kilometres (2,766 mi) from Moscow. Nashata is the nearest rural locality.
