= International Desalination and Reuse Association =

The International Desalination and Reuse Association (IDRA) is a non-profit association working to promote water scarcity and solutions to other water problems. Before 2024, the organization was called the International Desalination Association (IDA).

== Formation ==
IDRA was established in 1973 and works to develop and promote the appropriate use of desalination and desalination technology globally in; the water supply, water reuse, water pollution control, water purification, water treatment, and other water sciences and technology. The IDRA does this by encouraging research, promoting and exchanging communication, disseminating information, and supporting education in desalination and water sciences. A non-profit association, IDRA is associated with the United Nations as part of a growing international network of non-governmental organizations (NGOs).

== Membership and activities of IDRA ==
IDRA connects the global desalination and reuse community in many ways. It serves more than 2,600 core members in 60 countries and reaches an additional 4,000 affiliate members around the world. Its membership includes scientists, utilities and other end-users, engineers, consultants, financiers, developers, researchers, and students representing governments, corporations, and academia.

IDRA's educational resources include scholarships, the IDRA Fellowship Program, the Young Leaders Program, and at one time included the IDA Desalination Academy. IDRA's publications and online and multi-media communications are oriented toward the interest of the desalination and reuse industry. Workshops and smaller IDRA conferences, held worldwide, explore specific technical topics. The biennial IDRA World Congress is a larger event focused on the desalination and water reuse community. The World Congress is held in a different country each time.

IDRA partners with governments and NGOs in pursuit of a sustainable water supply, including participation in events such as COP29. In another example, IDRA supports the World Bank's Desalination Community of Practice.

IDRA also provides information to the general public about desalination and water reuse and their role in providing expanded, reliable, and sustainable sources of freshwater worldwide. IDRA's Desalination and Reuse Handbook provides detailed information about the current status of the desalination industry and profiles of many water industry contractors.

IDRA is headquartered in Danvers, Massachusetts in the USA.

== Energy efficiency and environmental responsibility ==
IDRA advocates the development and use of desalination technologies and practices that lower costs, reduce energy requirements and enhance environmental responsibility. IDRA's Energy Task Force is actively engaged in promoting strategies to help the industry further reduce energy requirements.
