= Ida Törnström =

Swedish writer, teacher and painter (1862–1949)

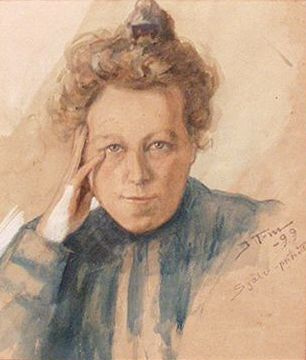
- Self-portrait
- Born: 24 March 1862; Gothenburg, Sweden
- Died: 26 August 1949 (aged 87); Gothenburg, Sweden
- Occupations: Painter, teacher and writer
- Writing career
- Pen name: Sölve

Ida Albertina Törnström, who wrote poetry under the pseudonym Sölve, (24 March 1862 – 26 August 1949) was a Swedish writer, teacher and painter.

== Life ==
Törnström was born in Gothenburg in 1862.

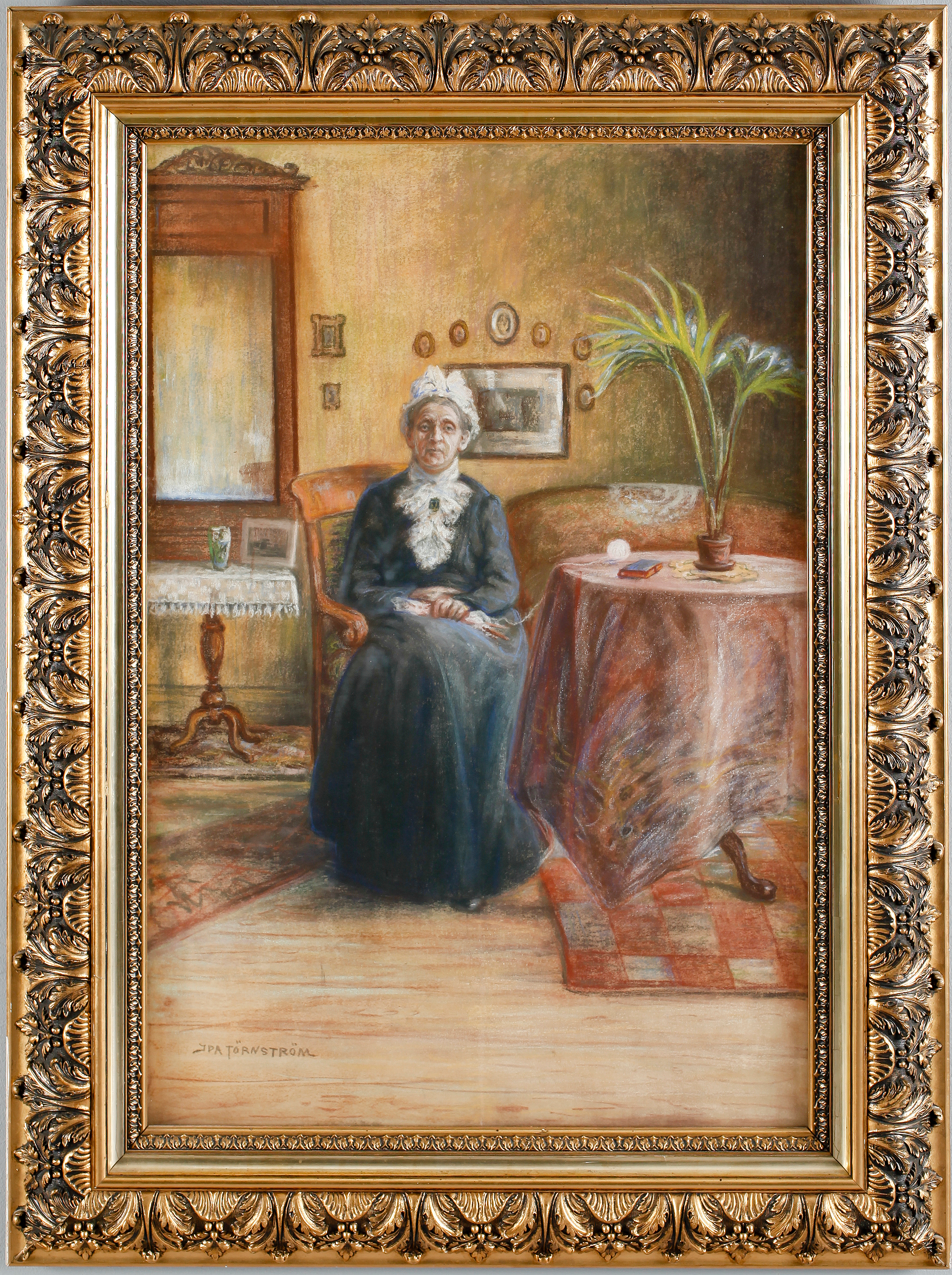
Woman with needlework by Törnström

She was the daughter of Carl Johan Emanuel Törnström and Albertina Strömberg and sister of Anna Törnström. Ida went with her father who was a sea captain to England and Canada in 1875. She returned and completed her schooling in Gothenburg. She continued her studies at the Technical School in Stockholm and then with Reinhold Callmander, Carl Larsson and Bruno Liljefors at Valand's painting school in Gothenburg, 1886– 1889).

In the summer of 1891 she stayed in Portugal and France, where she spent some time in Grez before traveling to Paris. In Paris she studied with the French painter Henri Gervex. She returned to her home town in 1892 where she gave private drawing lessons. She worked as a drawing teacher at the Kjellbergska girls' school in Gothenburg from 1896 and at her teacher's seminar from 1908, at Sigrid Rudebeck's gymnasium from 1908 to 1913 and at the Gothenburg Women's Folk School seminar from 1909 to 1912. Under the pseudonym Sölve, she published her poetry collections Dichterr in 1900 and Rhythmic magic. Collected poems in 1922. In addition, her work appeared in magazines and the daily press.

In 1906, she and her sister Anna published in the journal Varia and their book of travel memories and Gothenburg pictures titled Around the turn of the century, was published in 1937.

Her art consists of still life, interiors and cityscapes from Sweden and Denmark as well as forest landscapes. Her paintings were included in the Salon in Paris in 1892 and she participated in the Swedish Artist's Exhibition in Vienna in 1913. She was involved with exhibitions at the Art Academy in 1911 as well as at Liljevalch's Art Hall in 1917. She participated in collections exhibitions in Lund, Helsingborg and in Gothenburg. She drew several ex-libris and performed several illustrative assignments, including illustrating Viktor Rydberg's poem Childhood Poetry. Törnström is represented at the National Museum in Stockholm and Gothenburg City Museum.

Törnström died in Gothenburg in 1949.
