= Ida McQuesten =

American politician (1869–1945)

Member of the Washington House of Representatives from the 35th district
- In office 1928–1932

Personal details
- Born: November 1869 Lake City, Iowa
- Died: October 25, 1945 (aged 75) Tacoma, Washington
- Party: Republican

Ida McQuesten (November 1869 – October 25, 1945) was an American politician. She was a Republican, representing District 35 in the Washington House of Representatives which included parts of Pierce County, from 1928 to 1932.
