= Jan-Erik Silfverberg =

Swedish ice hockey player

- Born: January 21, 1953 (age 72)
- Height: 180 cm (5 ft 11 in)
- Weight: 174 lb (79 kg; 12 st 6 lb)
- Position: Defense
- Shot: Right
- National team: Sweden
- Playing career: 1970–1982

Jan-Erik Silfverberg (born January 21, 1953) is a former professional ice hockey player. He played defense for 11 seasons with Brynäs IF of the Swedish Elitserien. He is the father of Jakob and Joakim Silfverberg.

== Awards ==
League	Season(s)
Swedish Champion	1971-1972
Swedish Junior Hockey Player of the Year (Årets Junior)	1971-1972
SHL SM-silver medal	1974-1975
SHL Champion	1975–1976, 1976–1977, and 1979–1980
World Championship Silver Medal	1976-1977
