= Psychology Beyond Borders =

Australian-based nonprofit organization

Psychology Beyond Borders (PBB) is an international non-profit organisation focused on the research and treatment of the mental and community health impacts of terrorism and natural disasters. It was created by Issues Deliberation Australia/America (IDA), an international non-partisan public policy and political psychology think tank, in 2005.

== History ==
IDA was founded in 1999 with the goal of establishing an organisation to encourage education and public debate on important issues facing Australia, America, and the world, with a subsidiary mission of conducting research on the public approach to these issues and public decision-making processes. It was incorporated in Australia as an Approved Research Institute and tax exempt charity, and in America as a 501(c)(3) non-profit foundation, and based in Adelaide, Australia and Austin, Texas.

This first International Assembly on Managing the Psychology of Fear and Terror, convened in 2004 by the IDA in Texas, gave rise to Psychology Beyond Borders, which was established in 2005,

In July 2011 IDA became the policy arm of Psychology Beyond Borders.

== IDA ==
=== IDA in Australia ===
In Australia, IDA was known for its use of deliberative opinion polling, an approach to polling which incorporates focused small-group discussions conducted over a multi-day meeting and is considered by its theorists to provide a superior measure of informed public opinion than other forms of polling. Working with the Australian national and local governments, IDA conducted deliberative polls in Australia covering the topics of whether Australia should become a republic (1999); reconciliation between Indigenous Australians and non-Indigenous Australians (2001); the formation of a bill of rights for the Australian Capital Territory (2002); and parliamentary reform in South Australia (2003). In 2007, a national deliberative poll on Australian Muslim/ non-Muslim relations was convened in Canberra.

=== Terrorism work ===
IDA's international work focused on the psychology of terrorism. In August 2004, IDA brought together 90 of the world's experts on managing fear and terror to develop a menu of strategies for managing the psychology of fear and terror from the individual to the global. These strategies were published in a White Paper, Managing the Psychology of Fear and Terror: Strategies for Governments, Communities, Individuals and Service Providers, and a film, Beyond Fear: Finding Hope in the Horror. In September 2006, this documentary was screened on Capitol Hill as part of the commemoration of the fifth anniversary of the 11 September 2001 terror attacks. The four congressmen who co-chair the two congressional caucuses dealing with mental health co-hosted the screening, and additional screenings were planned in the parliaments of other countries.

=== Research ===
IDA conducted also research in political psychology using traditional social scientific methods. This research includes investigations in identification and voting behaviour, the role of women in boards of directors, and the response of populations to large-scale attacks or natural disasters.

== Criticism ==
IDA has been criticised by some commentators for perceived bias in the speakers at deliberative polls. However, other observers have argued that these biases are overblown by critics, and that like other deliberative polls around the world, the informed national dialogue facilitated by the bringing together of a random sample of citizens with competing experts, counters typical flaws in traditional opinion polling.
