= Ida Mingle =

New Thought writer

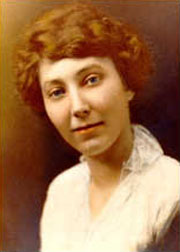
- Born: April 26, 1884; Coshocton, Ohio, United States
- Died: December 27, 1948 (aged 64); Chicago, Illinois, United States
- Resting place: Rosehill Cemetery & Mausoleum
- Occupations: Teacher and author
- Known for: Founder of School of Livable Christianity

Ida Mingle (26 April 1884 – 27 December 1948) was an American New Thought writer, teacher, faith healer, and leader. She was the founder of the New Thought movement known as the School Of Livable Christianity.

== Biography ==
Not much is known about Mingle's personal life except that she was born in Coshocton, Ohio. In 1905, she became a school teacher at Hazelton, Harper County Kansas.

Mingle was the private secretary to Charles Fillmore, the founder of “Unity Movement”. She was instrumental in the Unity movement. She wrote articles for the monthly Unity magazine. She also held lectures and classes, and published courses. In 1919, she moved to Chicago to continue her work under the auspices of the First Unity School of Chicago. Mingle later left the organization and founded her own school known as the School of Livable Christianity.

Mingle died in Illinois on December 27, 1948, at the age of 64.

== Selected writings ==
Mingle was the author of several books, including: (Note: Information in this section largely comes from Contemporary Authors Online with additional material from Amazon.com and Google Books.)

- Science Of Love With Key To Immortality. (1926)
- Spiritual Significance Of The Body. (1936)
- Steps in the Way - Volume 1. (1929)
- Steps in the Way - Volume 2. (1929)
- Universal Significance Of World Events. (1930)
- Poems Of Truth And Meditations. (1924)

Booklets

- The Fourth Dimension (1923)
- The Day of Harvest (1918)

== See also ==
- List of New Thought writers
