= Ida Ridge =

Mountain in British Columbia, Canada

- Location within British Columbia
- Interactive map of Ida Ridge

Highest point
- Elevation: 1,981 m (6,499 ft)
- Coordinates: 51.08°N 119.94°W

Geography
- Location: British Columbia, Canada

Geology
- Rock age: Pleistocene
- Mountain type: Cinder cone
- Volcanic field: Wells Gray-Clearwater volcanic field
- Last eruption: Pleistocene

Ida Ridge is an eroded cinder cone in east-central British Columbia, Canada, located in the southeastern corner of Wells Gray Provincial Park.

== See also ==
- List of volcanoes in Canada
- Volcanism of Canada
- Volcanism of Western Canada
