= Ida Silfverberg =

Finnish painter (1834–1899)

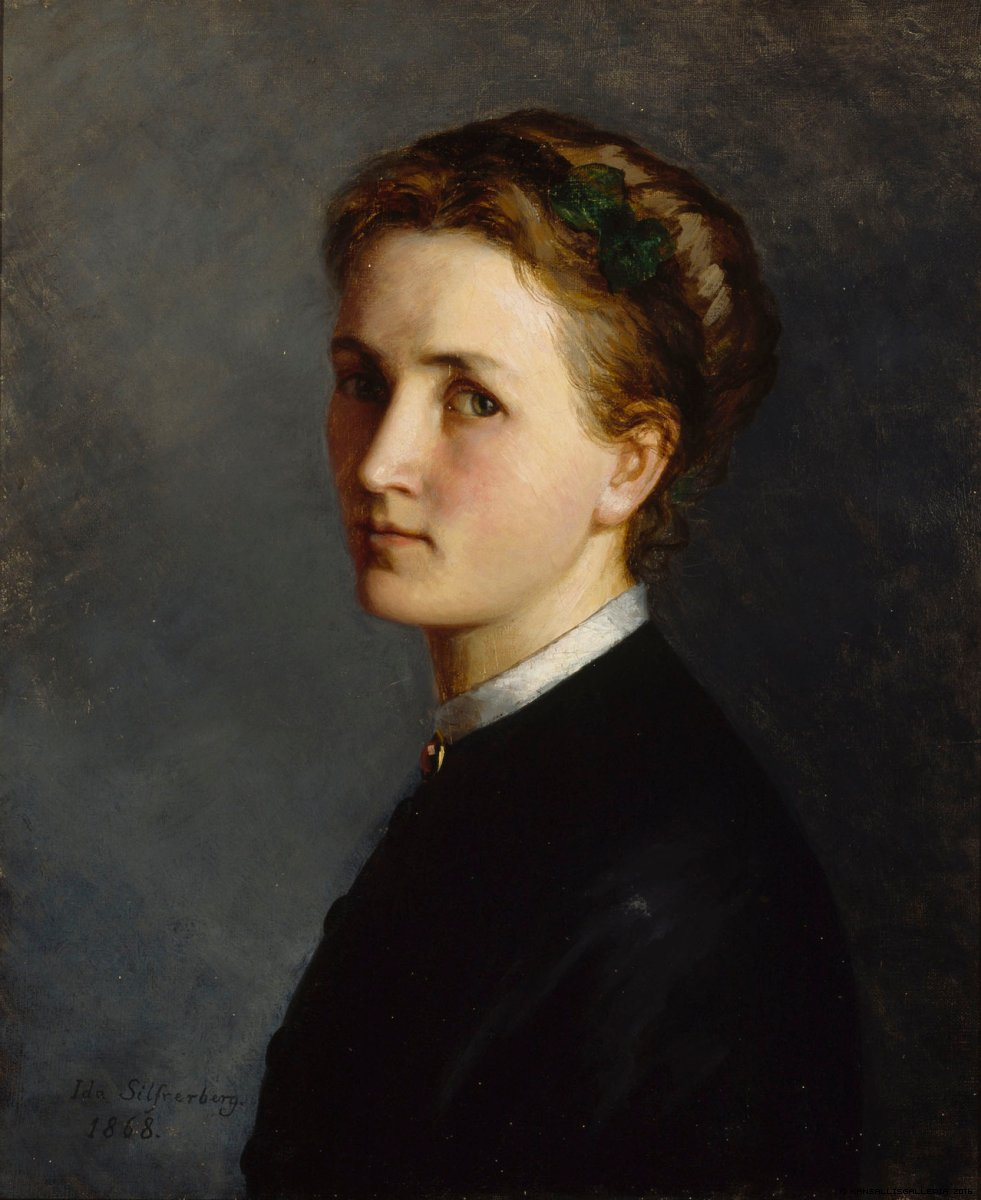
- Self-portrait, 1868
- Born: 23 January 1834; Helsinki
- Died: 23 December 1899 (aged 65); Florence
- Occupations: Artist, copyist

Ida Silfverberg (23 January 1834 – 23 December 1899) was a Finnish painter who painted in Germany, France and Italy.

== Life and career ==
Silfverberg was born in Helsinki on 23 January 1834. By age 15, she began painting copies of paintings at the Finnish Art Association's exhibition in 1849.

She went on to paint copies of paintings by Dutch artists in the collection of the Gemaldegalerie Alte Meister in Dresden. In 1860, she won the second prize for the Finnish Ducat Competition for the promotion of young artists and in 1862, she won the first prize in the same competition.

Silfverberg died in Florence. She is known as a copyist and portraitist as well as for her genre scenes.

== Legacy ==
Silfverberg's Woman teaching a Child to Read was purchased by the Serliachus Museum as being by Pehr Hilleström. Her true signature was only recently discovered after the forged Hillstrom signature was found to be fraudulent.

In 2025, Silfverberg's work was featured in an exhibition Crossing Borders - Travelling Women Artists in the 1800s at the Ateneum in Helsinki, followed by a second showing of the exhibition in the Museum Kunstpalast in Düsseldorf.

== Gallery ==
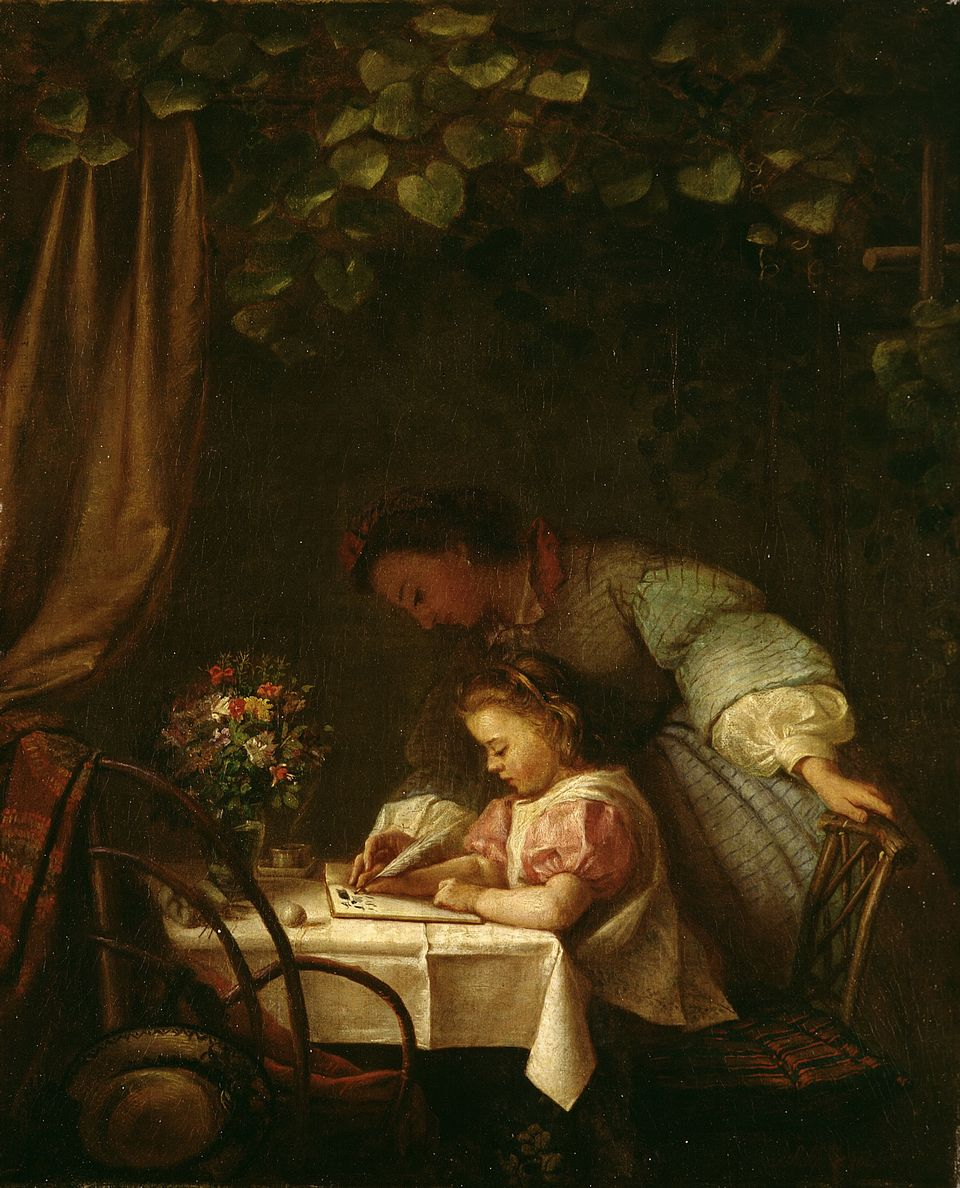
Ida Silfverberg - Woman teaching a Child to Read

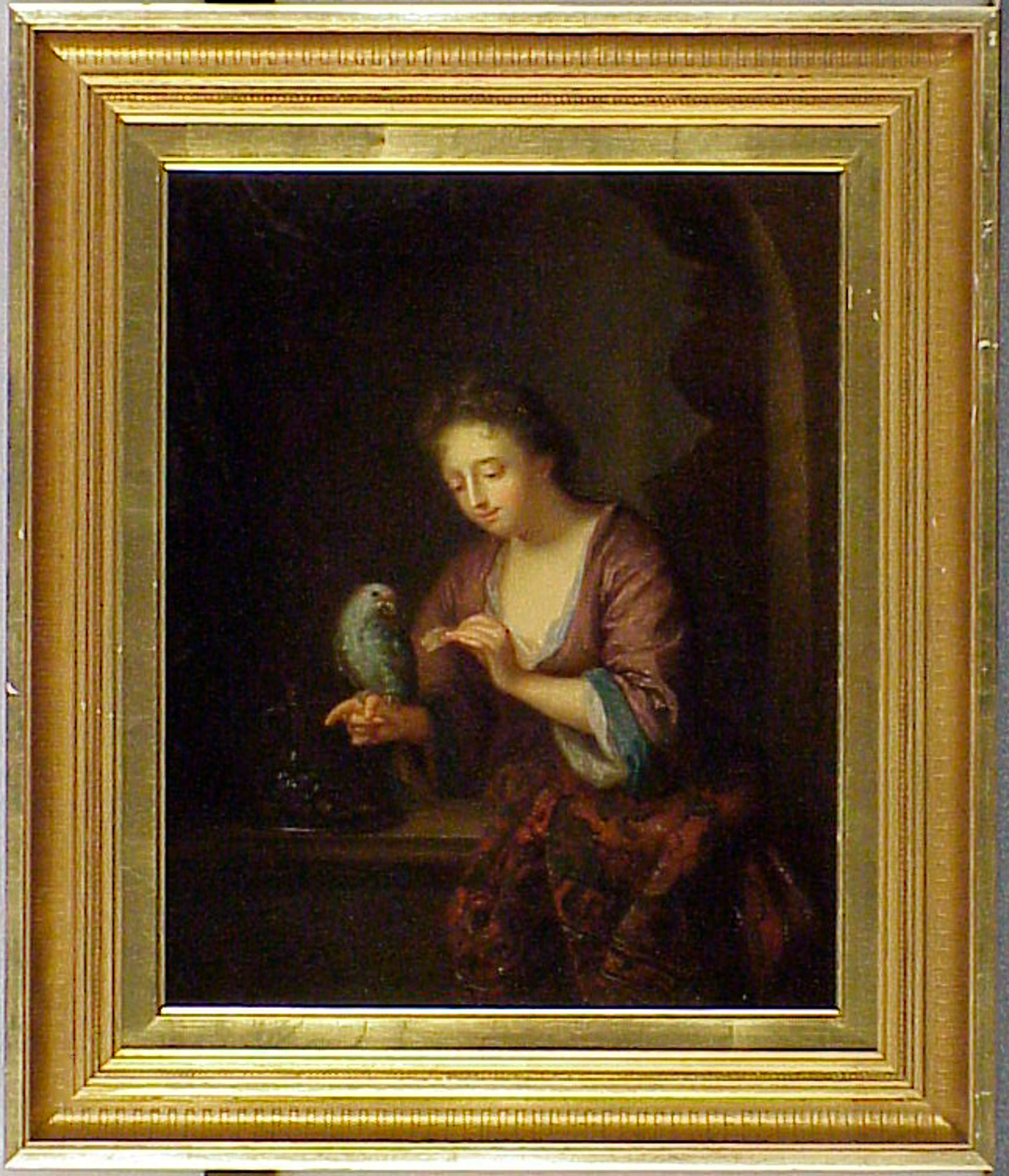
Woman Feeding a Parrot - copy of a painting by Arnold Boonen

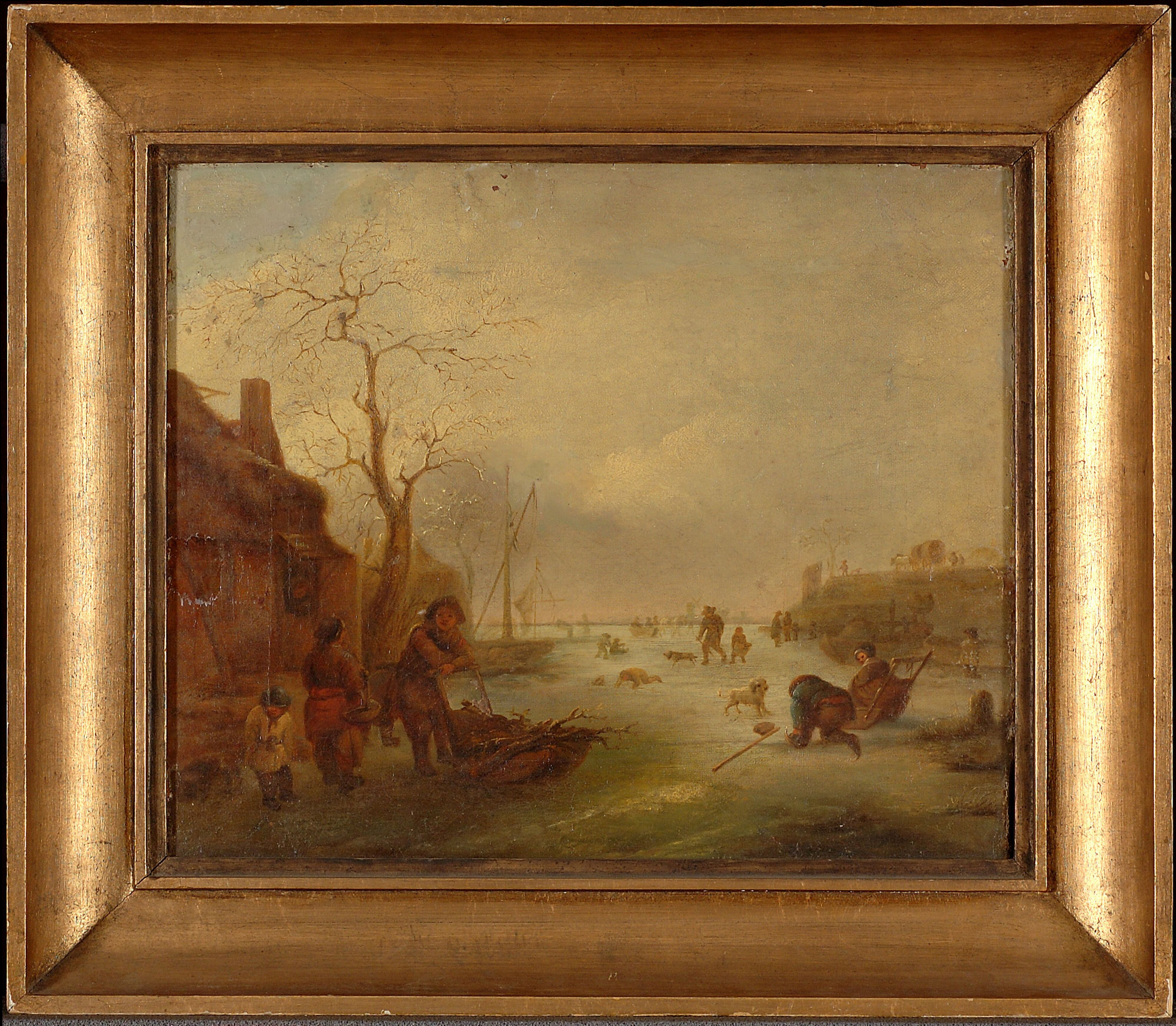
Skaters in Holland, copy of Isaac van Ostade

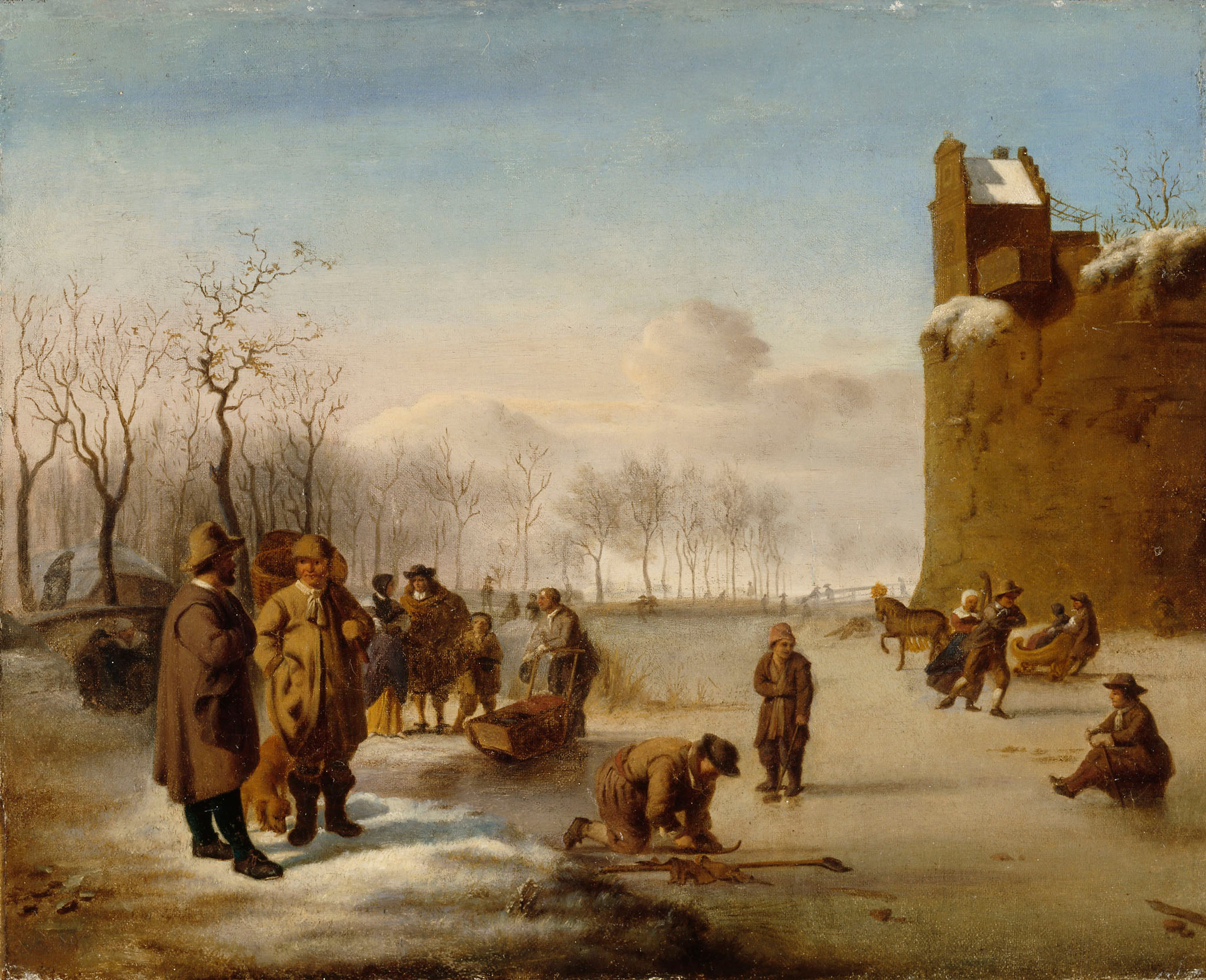
Skaters. Copy of a painting by Adriaen van de Velde

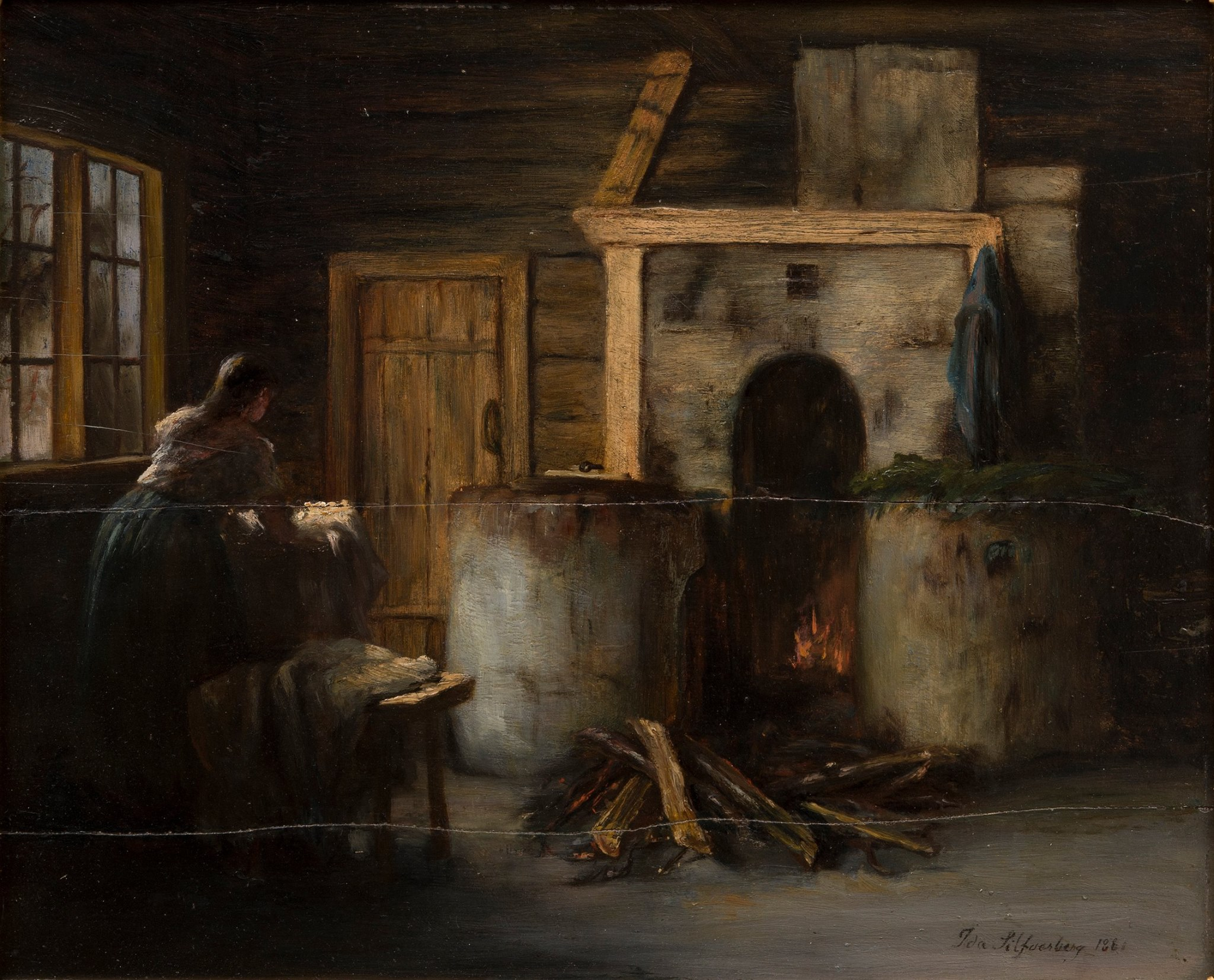
"In the laundry room" (Pesutuvassa), 1861

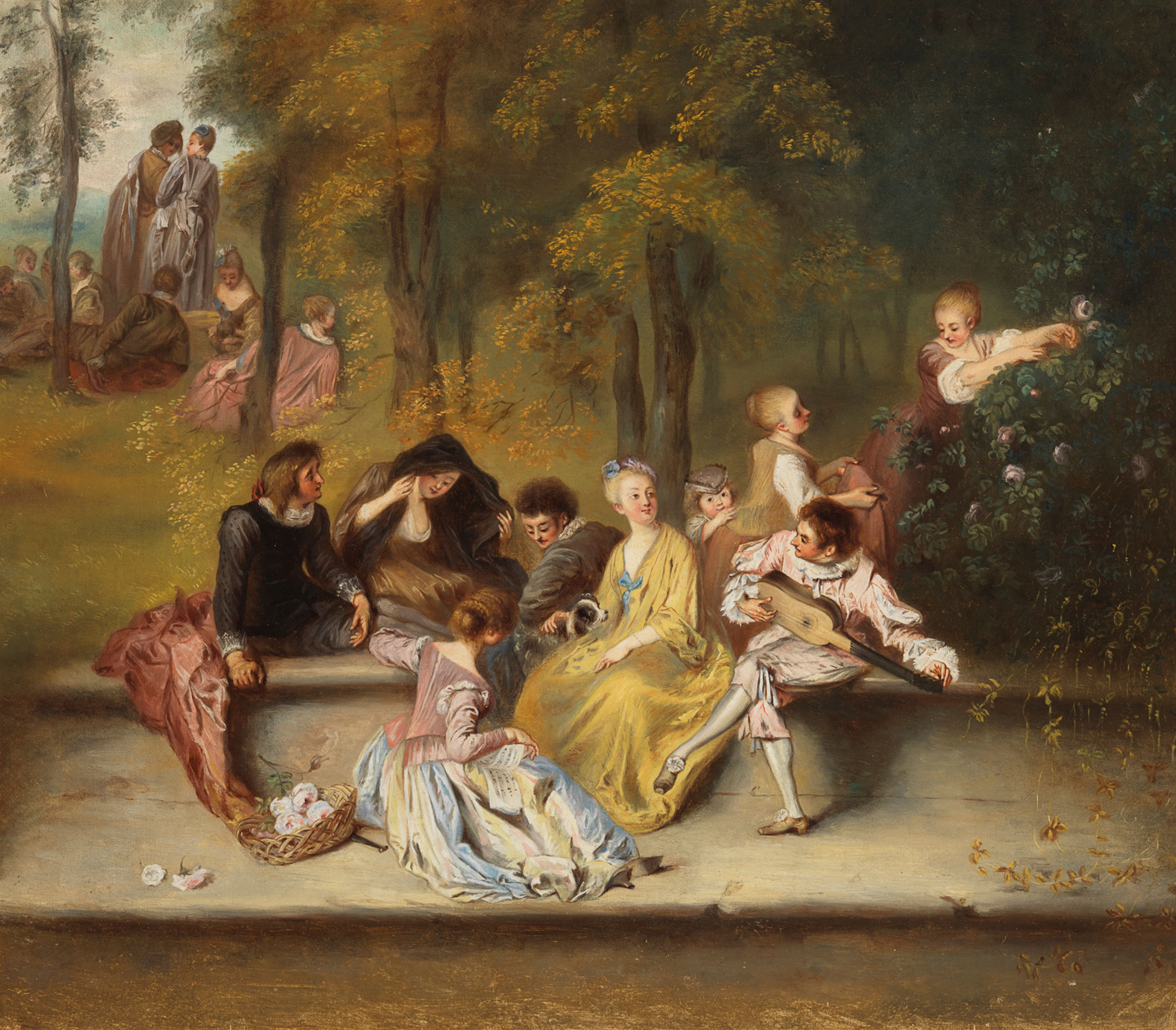
Gentlemen and Ladies on the Terrace, after detail in painting by Antoine Watteau - Finnish National Gallery

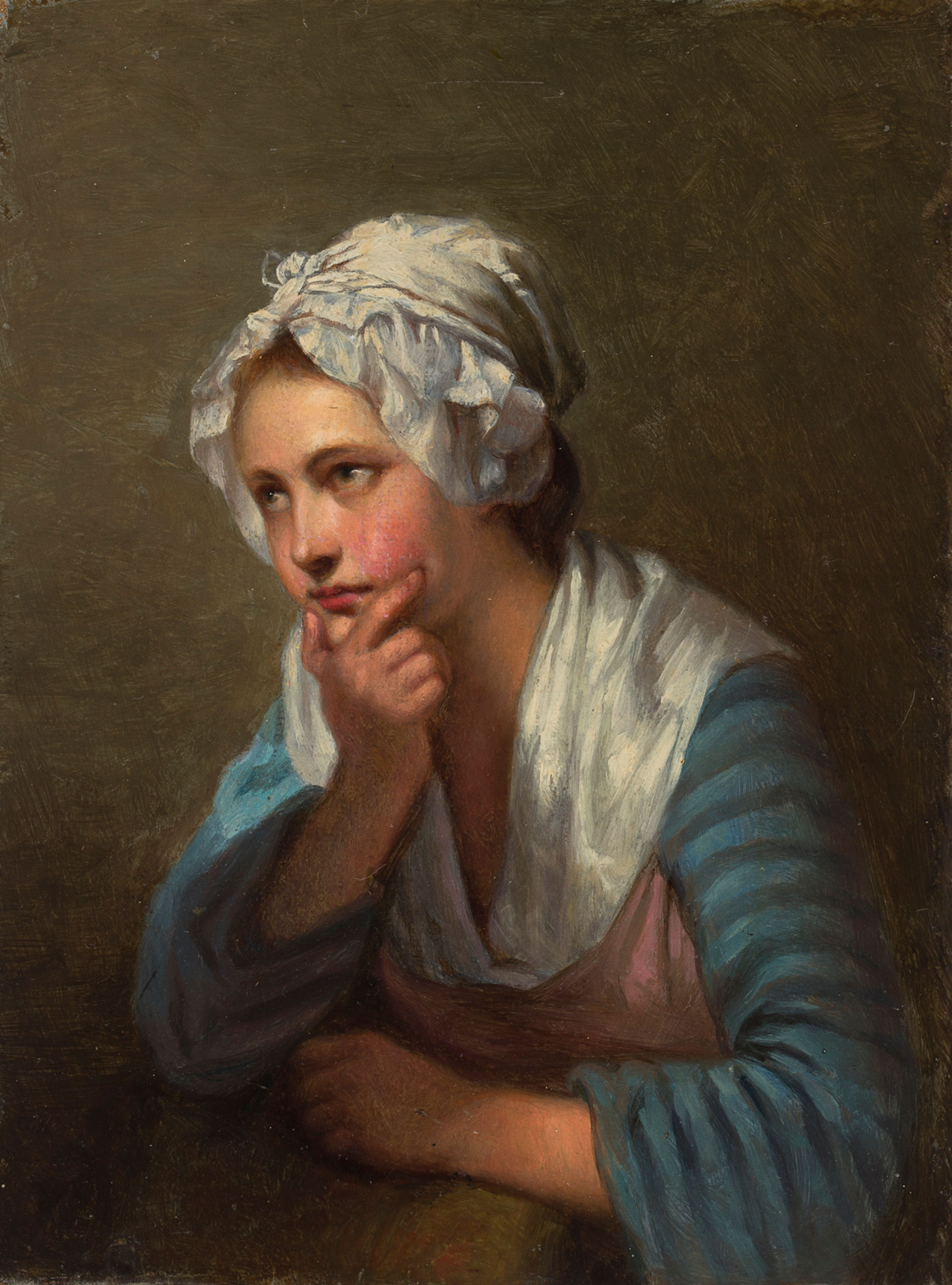
Girl Leaning on Her Hand, copy of detail in Jean-Baptiste Greuze’s painting “L’accordée de village” - Finnish National Gallery

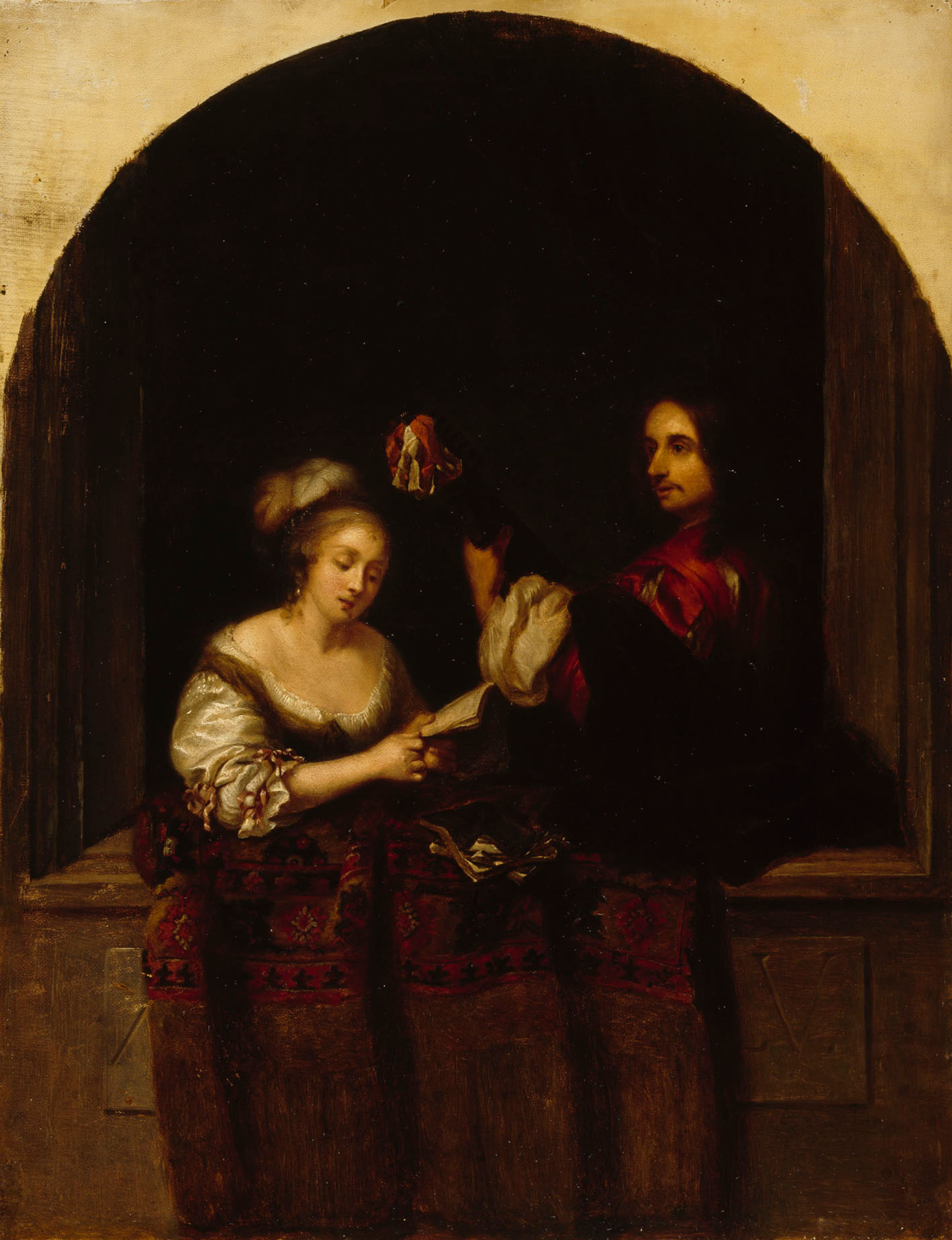
A woman singing and a gentleman playing the guitar, copy of work by Caspar Netscherin, Finnish National Gallery

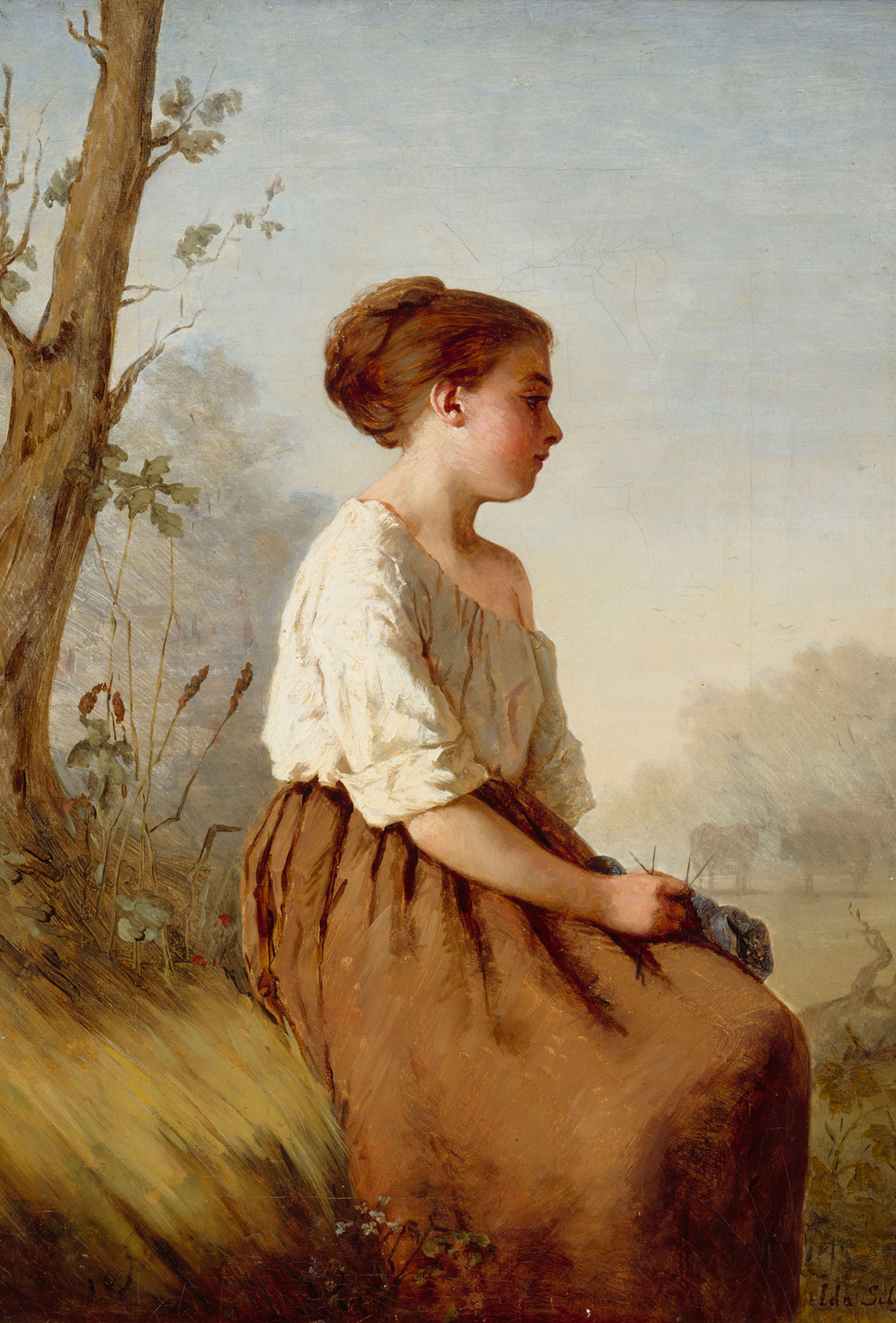
The Shepherdess - Finnish National Gallery

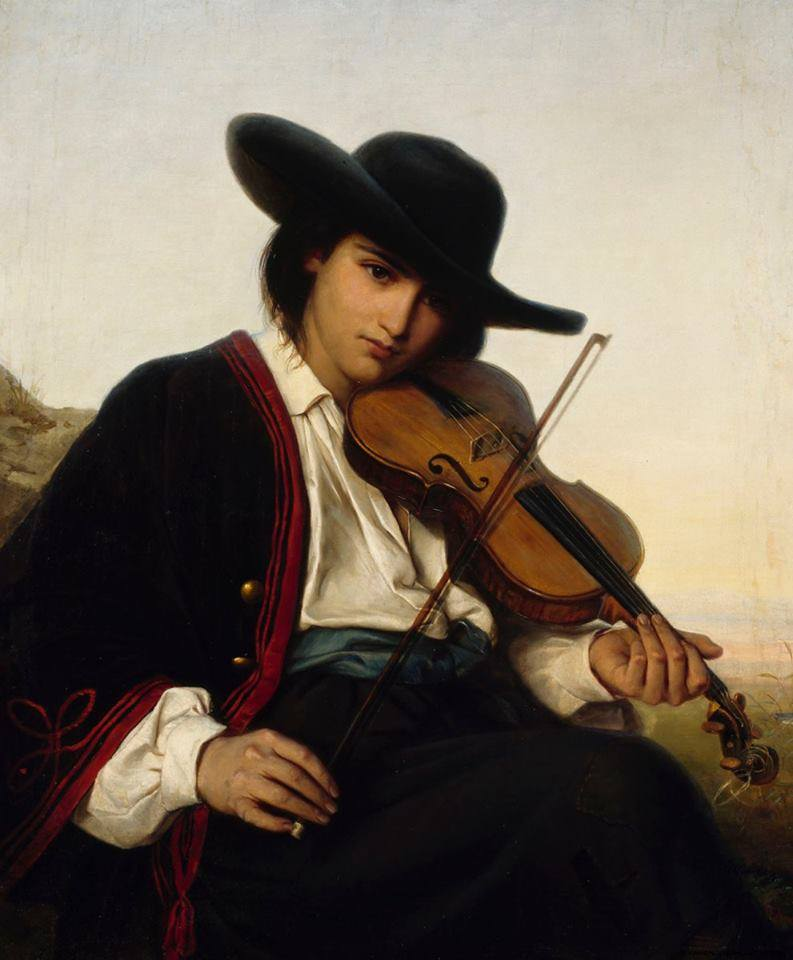
Ida Silfverberg, Bohemian fiddler, 1864

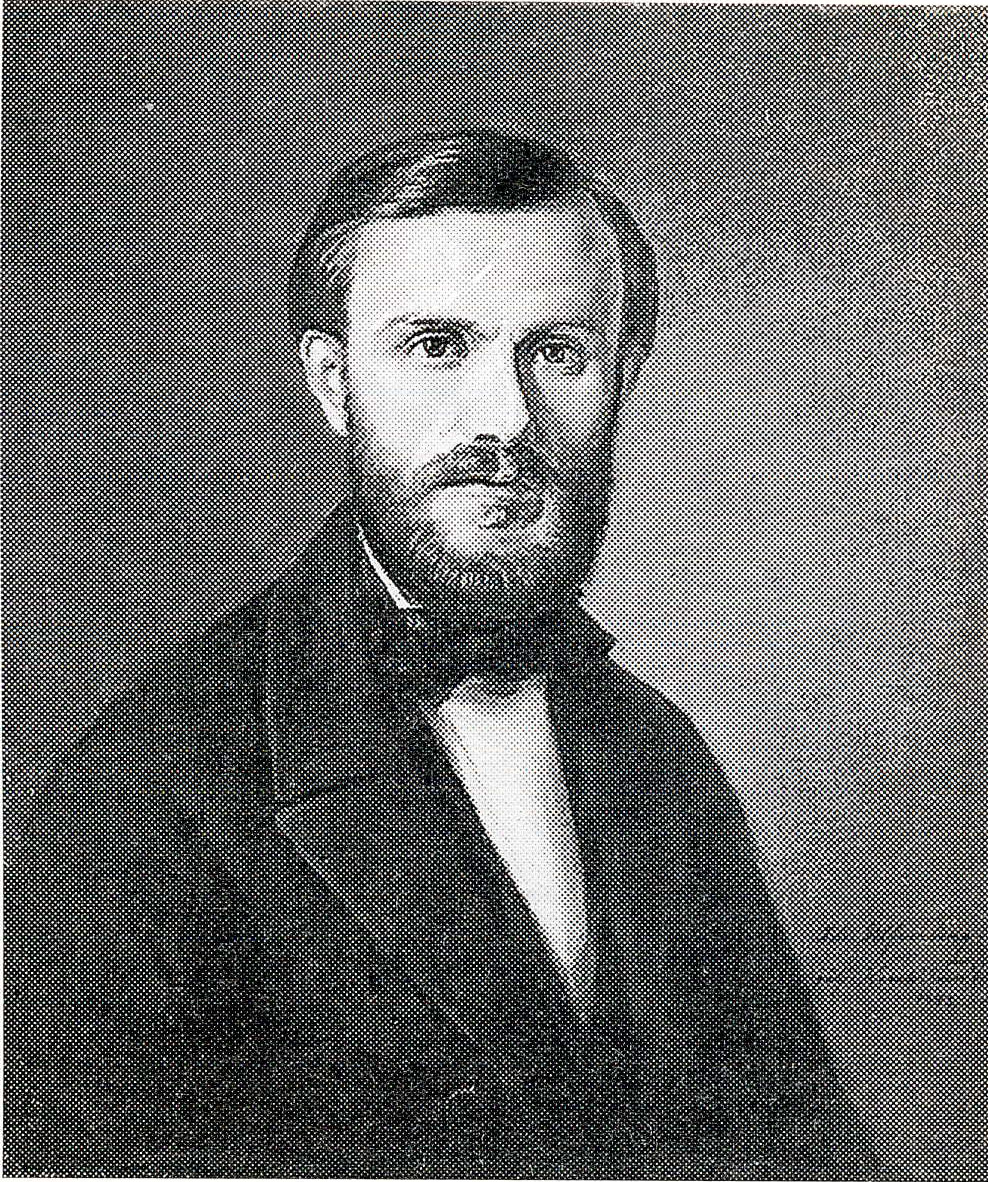
J. J. W. Lagus, (1821-1909), professor and rector of the University of Helsinki. Harald Smedberg's 1952 copy of a painting by Ida Silfverberg.

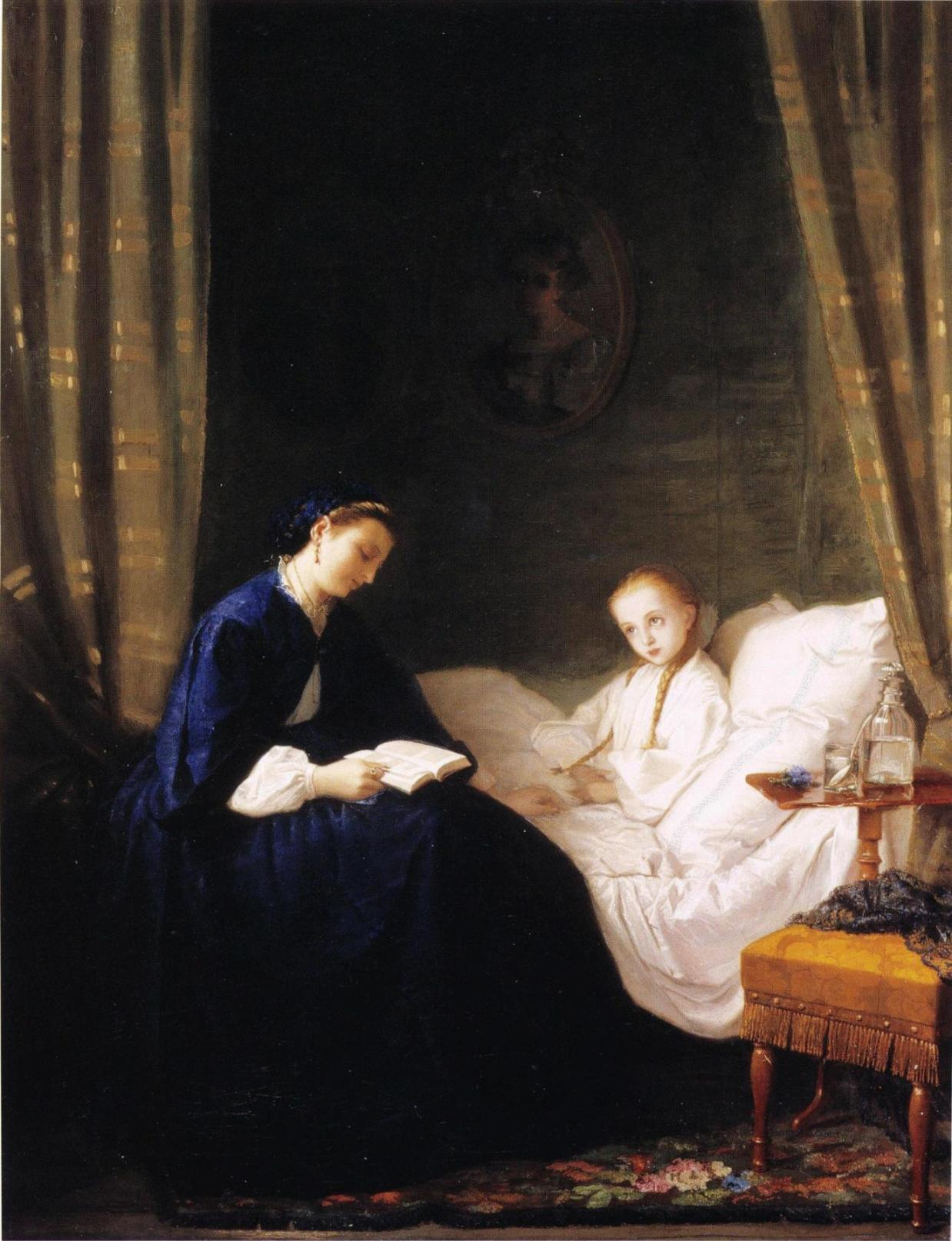
Mother reading to her sick child

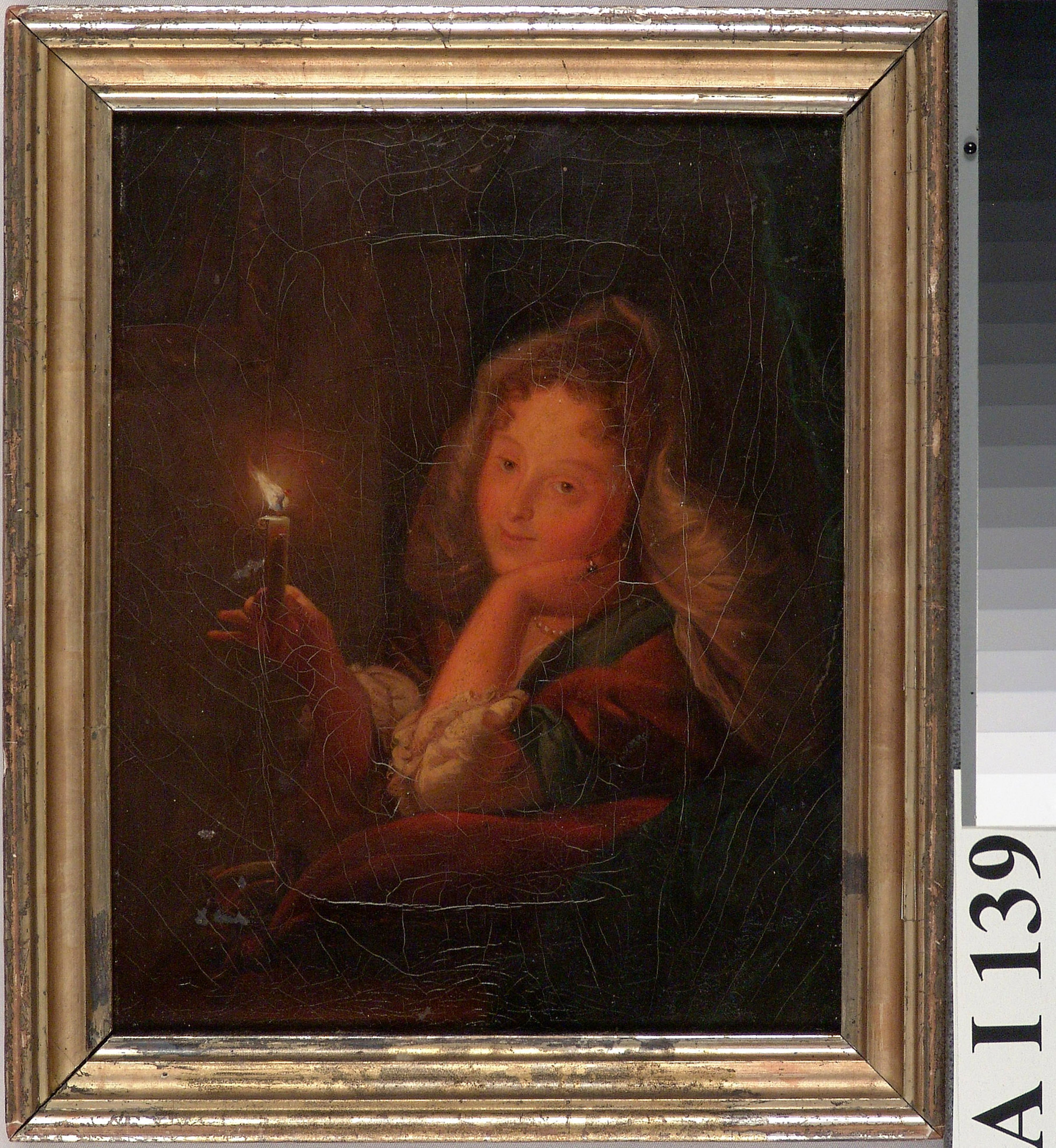
Young girl holding a candle, copy after Godfried Schalcken - Finnish National Gallery
