= Central-Western Region, Venezuela =

Administrative region of Venezuela

Coordinates: 10°4′26″N 69°19′17″W

Central-Western Region in Venezuela

The Central-Western Region (Spanish: Región Centro-Occidental) is one of the nine administrative regions of Venezuela. It comprises the states of Falcón, Lara, Portuguesa, and Yaracuy.

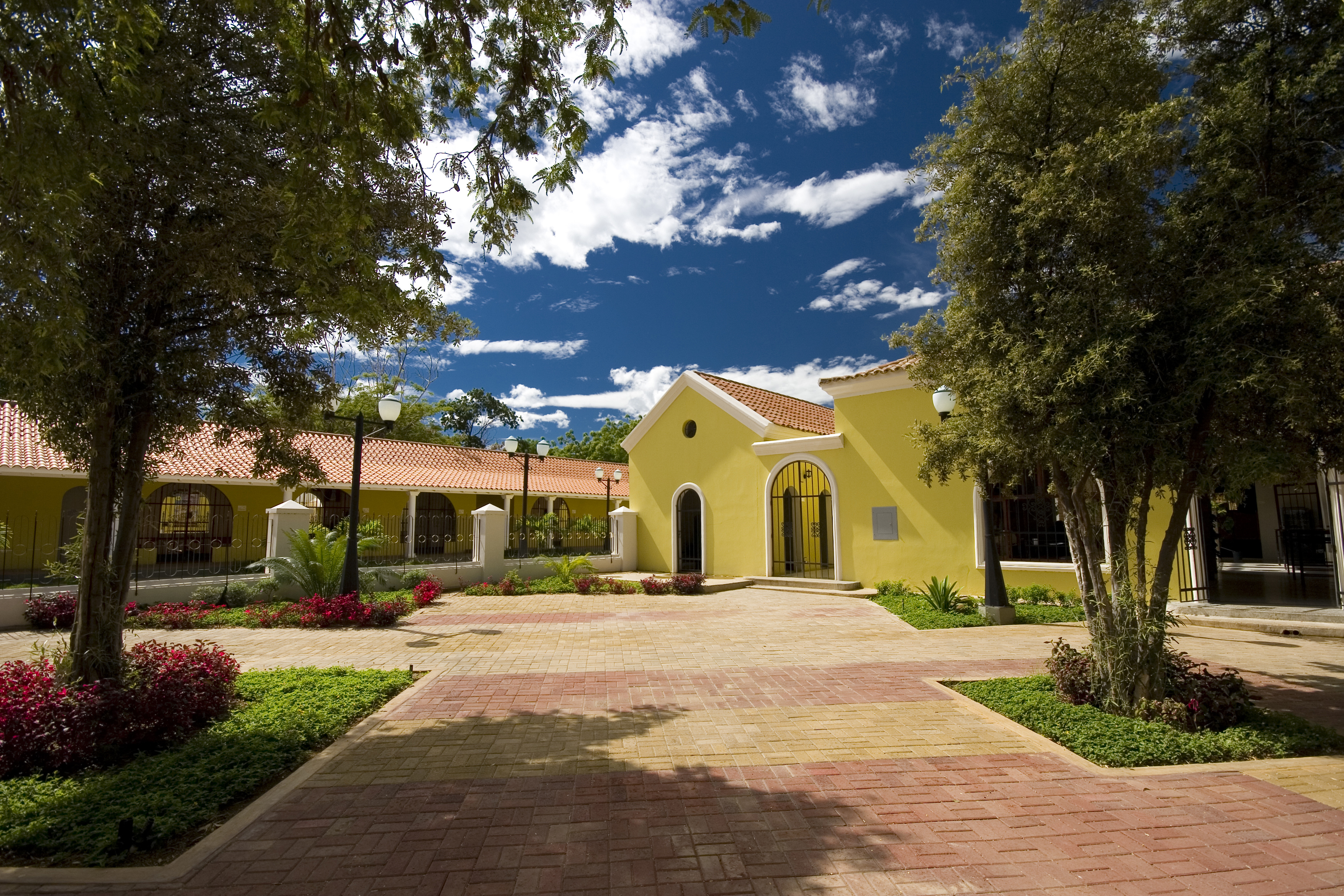
Historic center of Coro, Falcon State

The Caribbean Sea forms the region’s northern boundary. The other regions which it borders are the Central Region to the east, the Andean Region to the south and southwest, and the Zulian Region to the west.

== History ==
The area was first explored in 1499 by Juan de la Cosa and Américo Vespucio, as part of an expedition supervised by Alonso de Ojeda. In 1811, when Venezuela declared its independence, Coro remained faithful to the Spanish Crown and merged with the Province of Maracaibo, until Fernando VII decreed the creation of the Province of Coro in 1815.

In 1879, together with Lara and Yaracuy, minus the Department of Nirgua, the Falcon State became part of the Western Northern State. Between 1881 and 1890 it formed with Zulia the State of Falcon-Zulia. In 1891 it appears again as an independent state with the name of Falcon. In the 1960s the current administrative region was created to give the region more economic dynamism.

== Geography ==
It has an area of 66900 km^{2}, which represents 7.3% of the national total.

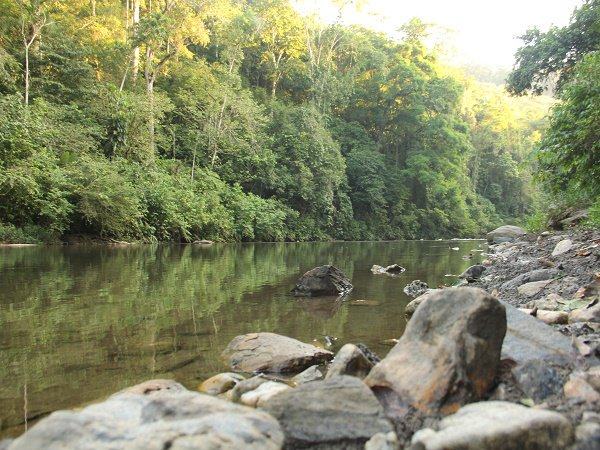
Tirgua National Park, Yaracuy

=== Weather ===
-Semi-arid, tropical, dry with high temperatures and low rainfall (BSh): located north of the Sierra de San Luis in Falcón and the Paraguaná Peninsula, in the Carora and Barquisimeto Depressions.

- Tropical Rainforest Climate(Aw): is located in Yaracuy.
- Tropical Rainforest Climate of Sabana (Aw): located in the plains of Portuguesa (Zamora, 2007)

=== Demographics ===
All the states in this region, with the exception of Lara, have negative migratory balances, due to socio-economic conditions. Lara and Yaracuy are the states with the largest urban populations in the region, followed by Falcón. However, this state has a quarter of its population in rural conditions. In the state of Portuguesa, more than a third of its population lives in rural areas.

The entity with the largest number of inhabitants is Lara, which is twice as large as the second most populous state. There are 4,155,062 inhabitants in the region, distributed over 65,900 square kilometres, or 7.19 per cent of the national territory. Among its main cities are Barquisimeto, Punto Fijo, Acarigua, San Felipe, among others.

The region has a total population of 4,231,060 inhabitants which are mostly concentrated in the states of Lara and Falcon. The most populated cities are Barquisimeto, Punto Fijo, Guanare, Coro and Acarigua.

== Economy ==
The economy is varied, but among the main resources are tourism, some oil and agricultural activities among others, an example of these tourist attractions and oil activities and others are the Morrocoy National Park (in Falcon), Basilica Menor Nuestra Señora de Coromoto (in Guanare), and the Cardon and Amuay refineries (also in Falcon). As well as the agricultural production where they derive items such as vegetables and so on.

=== Activities ===
They are dedicated to self-consumption agriculture, their crops are: potatoes, apples and peaches extracted from the Esperanza. Their products are agricultural exports from the Coma Yagua Valley: vegetables, tomatoes, onions, aubergines and cucumbers. Also coffee, maquilas and fruits for juice are cultivated.

== Gallery ==
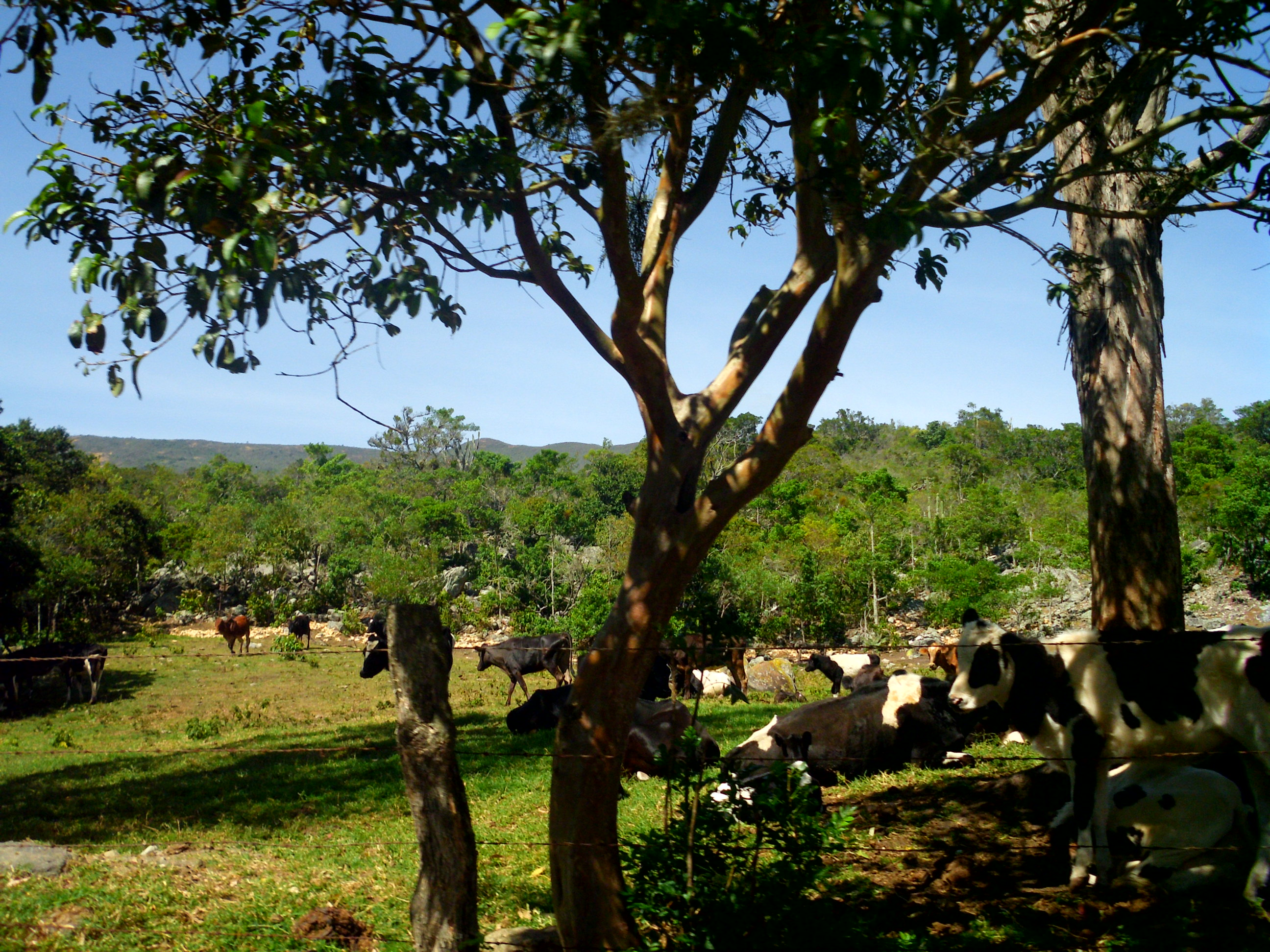
Cattle in Lara State

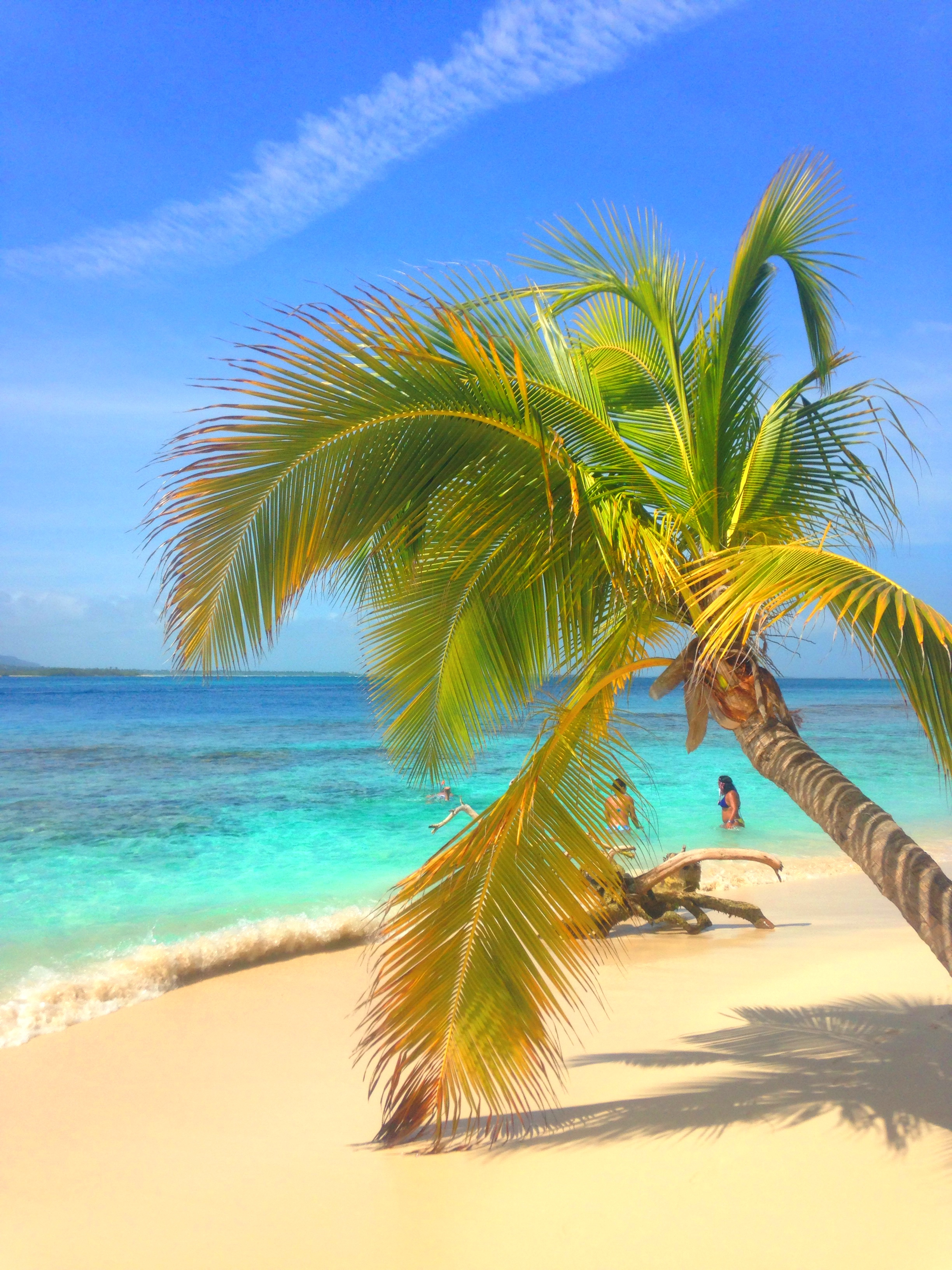
Cayo Sombrero, Morrocoy National Park

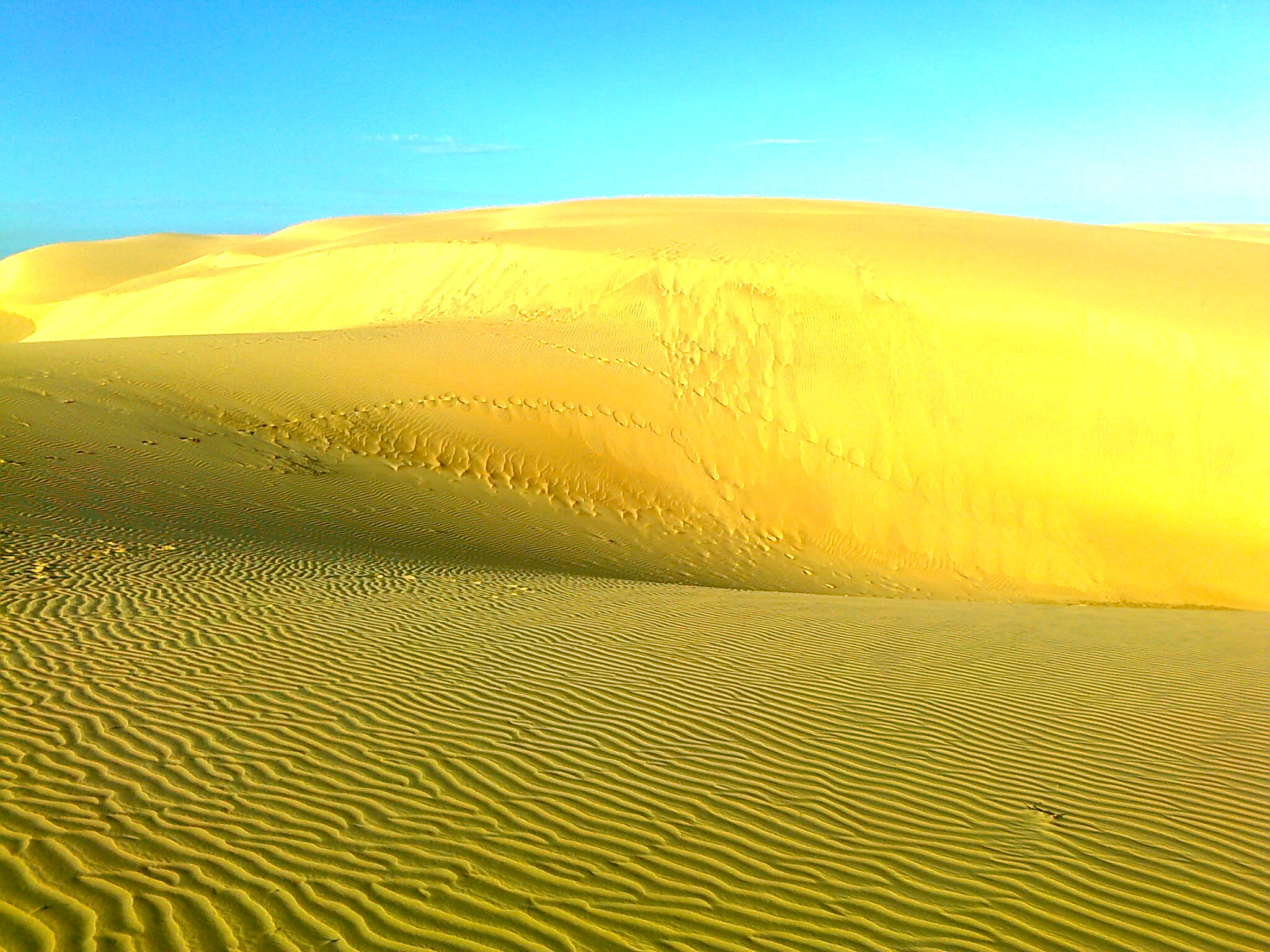
Medanos de Coro National Park

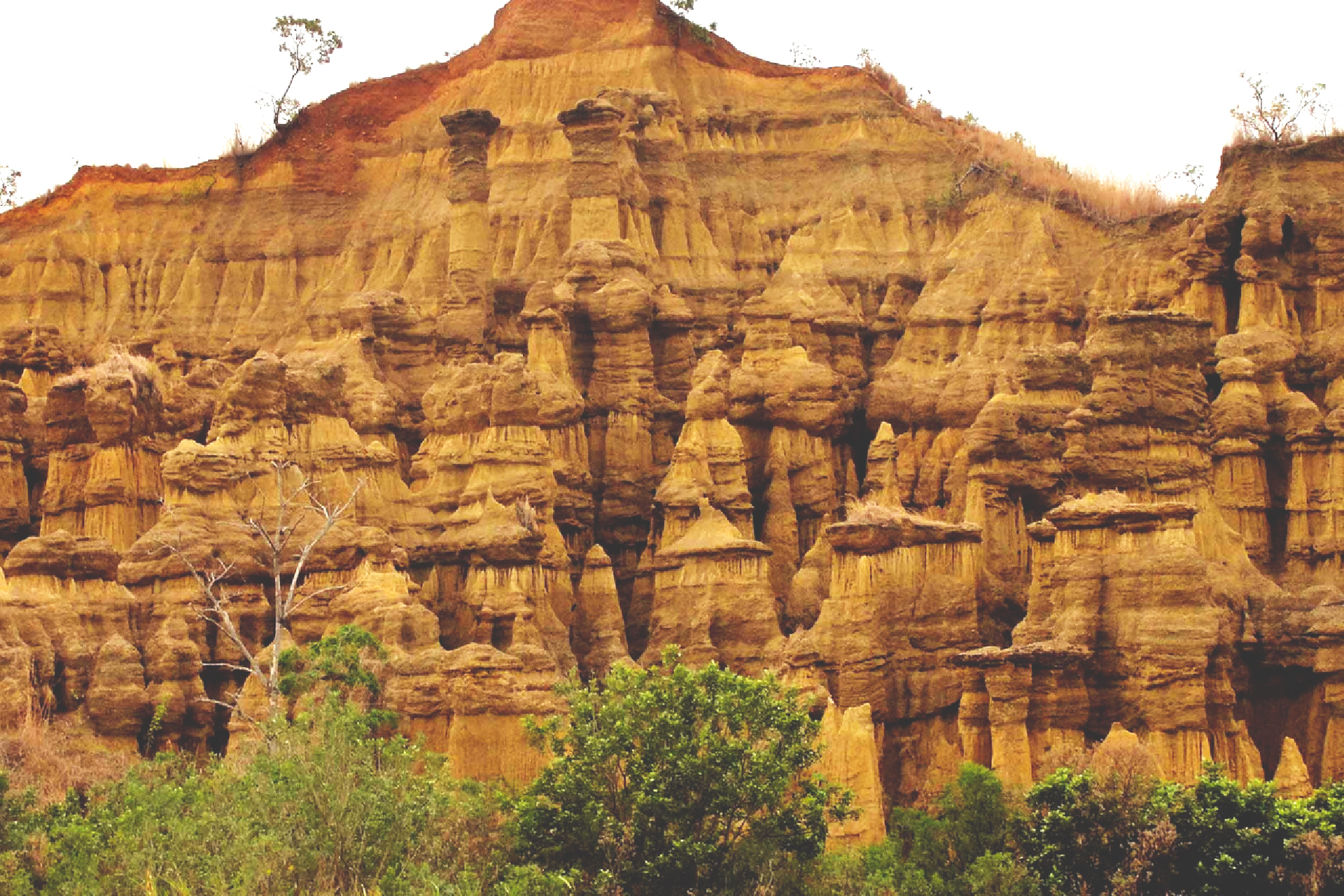
Los Frailes, Portuguesa State

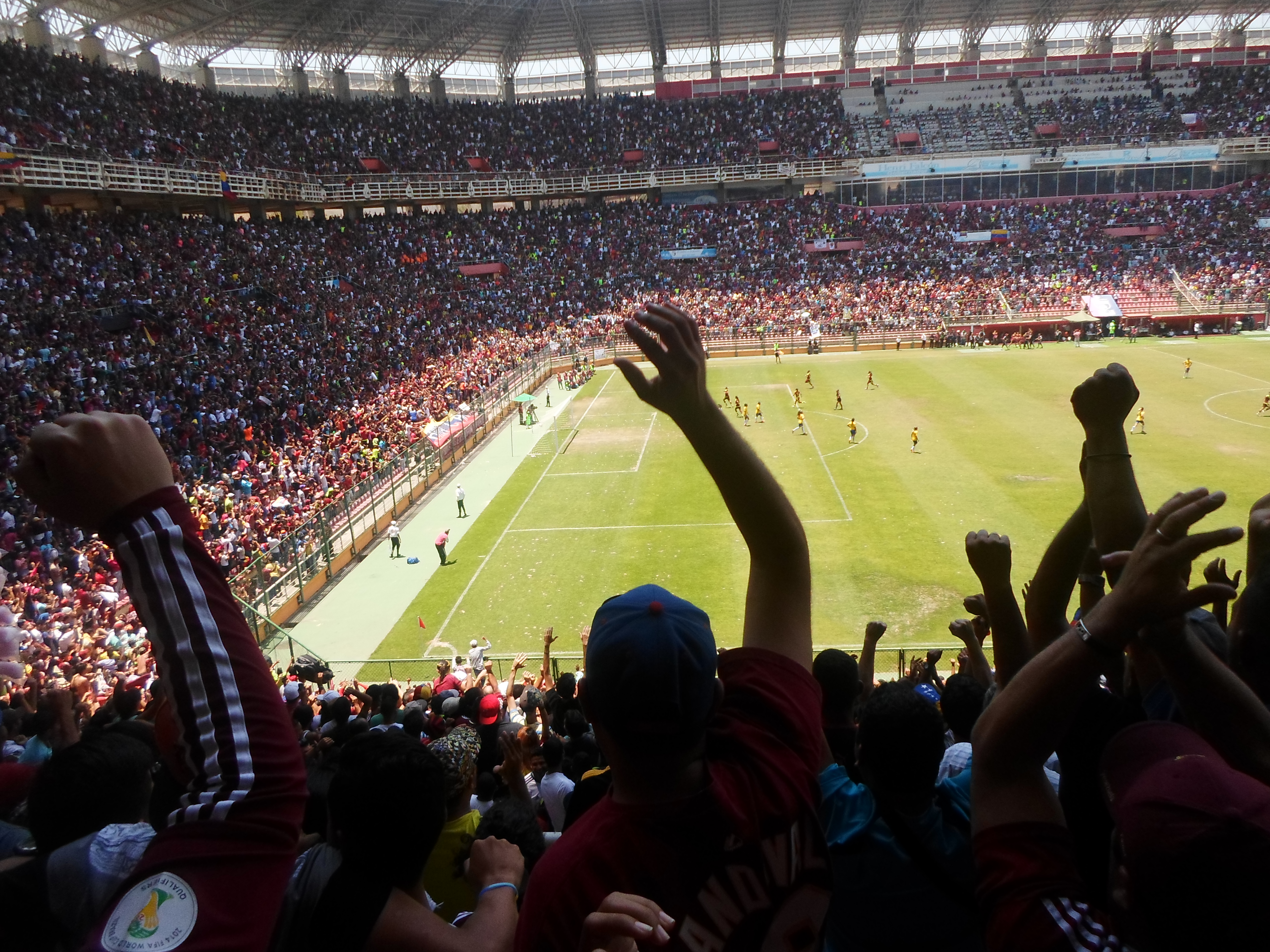
Estadio Metropolitano, Lara State
