= Los Llanos Region, Venezuela =

Administrative region of Venezuela

Llanos Region in Venezuela

The Llanos Region (Spanish: Región de los Llanos) is one of the nine administrative regions of Venezuela. It comprises the states of Guárico and Apure, except for the Páez Municipality.

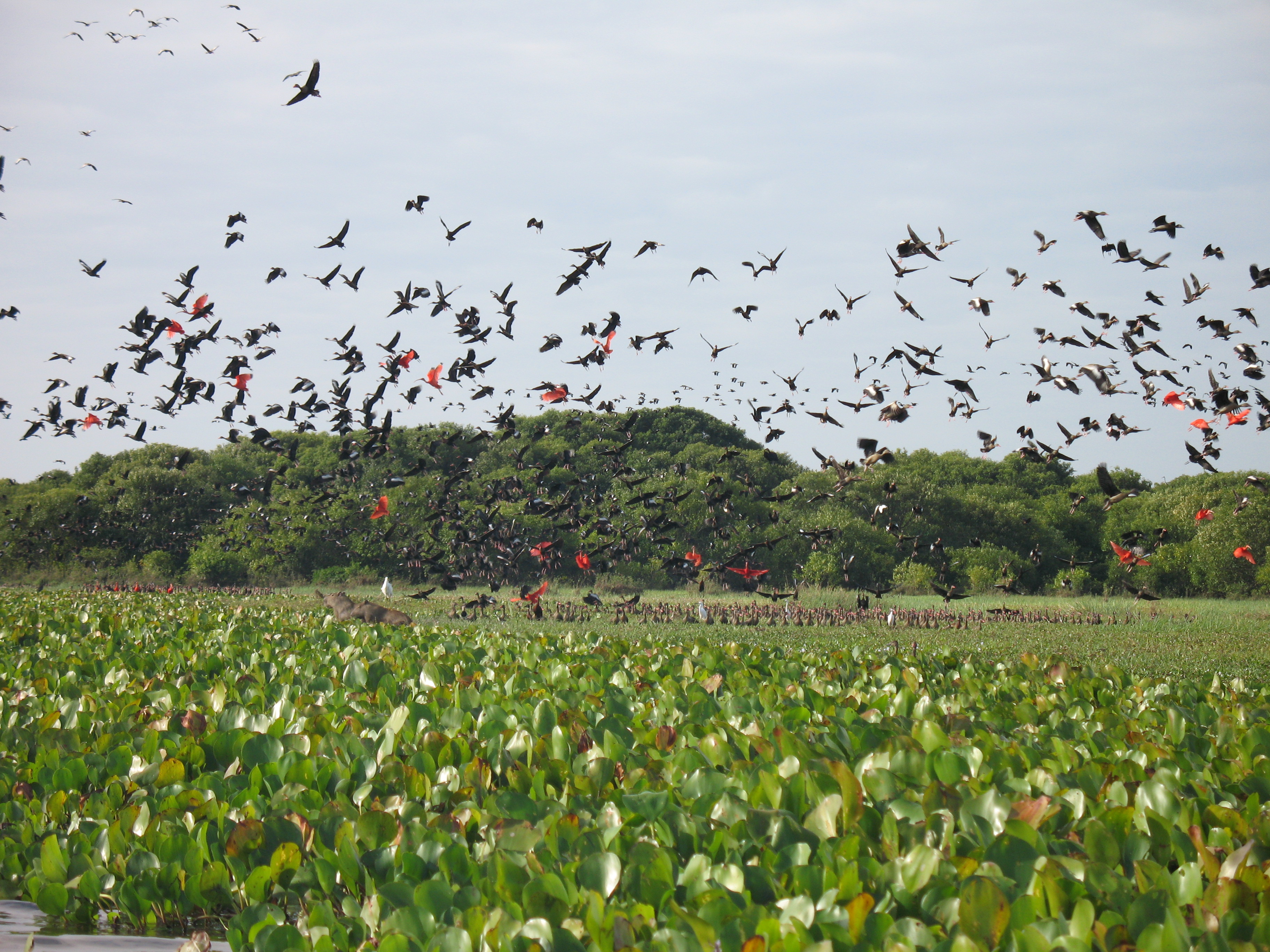
Los Llanos, Venezuela

This region borders the Andean Region to the west, the Central Region to the northwest, the Capital Region to the north, the Northeastern Region to the northeast, and the Guayana Region to the southeast. It also shares an international border with Colombia to the south.

== History ==
In colonial times, Apure was part of the Province of Merida del Espiritu Santo de la Grita. When Maracaibo was annexed, it was called the Province of Maracaibo. In 1856, it was established as a province, and it was given the status of a state in 1864.

The colonization of Guárico only began in the 17th century and above all in the 18th century. The cacique Chiparara managed to organize Carib and Otomac groups in the Llanos de Guárico to counter-attack the Spanish colonizing forces.4 After they were defeated, around 1653, the Carib and Otomac groups would either retreat southward or lose cohesion and be gradually assimilated.

After independence, Guárico became the scene of numerous battles in the civil wars that plagued the country in the 19th century. In 1856, Guárico became part of Venezuela's 21 provinces until it was declared an independent state in 1864, and an integral part of the United States of Venezuela.

After being dissolved in 1898, Guárico acquired its autonomy again and, in 1899, it was ratified by presidential decree. From this date on, it remained an independent state even though it suffered changes in its territory. Its boundaries with the state of Aragua were established by a protocol signed in 1933.

In 1969, the process of regionalization of Venezuela began through CORDIPLAN, during the government of Rafael Caldera.

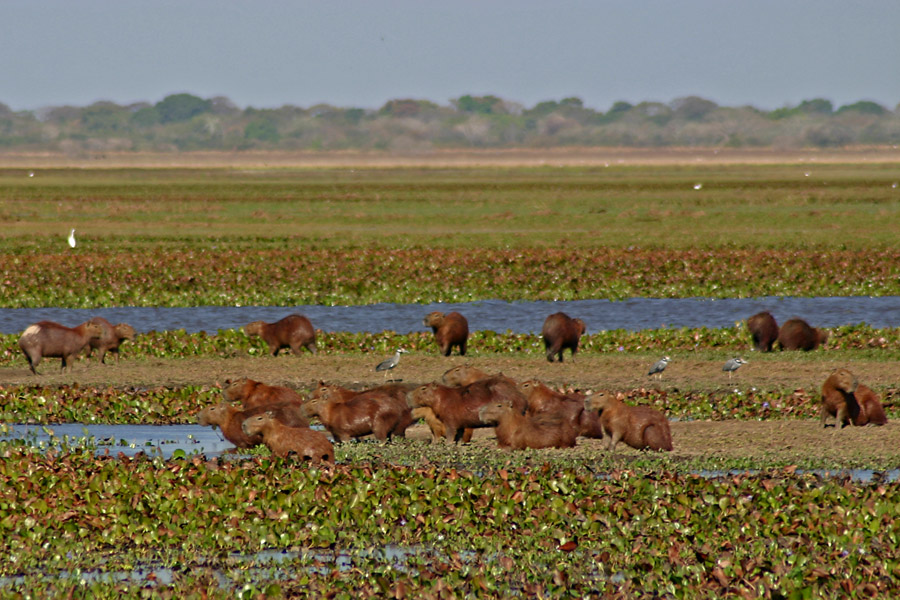
Hato La Fe, Guárico State

In the 1970s, the Central Plains Region was formed, which included the states of Guárico, Cojedes and Apure (except for the then Paez District, now Paez Municipality), as well as the Arismendi District of Barinas State and the Urdaneta District of Aragua State.

Later, in the 1980s, the state of Cojedes would join the states of Carabobo and Aragua (entirely) to form the Central Region and the Municipality Arismendi of the state of Barinas joins the Region of Los Andes, acquiring since then its current name.

== Geography ==
The lower plains, basically below 100 meters above sea level, are flooded during the rainy season or winter and have many rivers, parallel to each other and that change course frequently, due to the action of the dunes (sand mountains) that are moved by the winds during the drought (summer).

The high plains are located at the foot of the Andes and are very rich land for cultivation.

The Apure River crosses the western plains from west to east, its torrent being fed in the north by the inflows of the Uribante, Sarare, Caparo, Suripa, Ticoporo, Canaguá, Mamparo, Santo Domingo, Portuguesa and Guárico Rivers. To the south and east are the Meta, Cinaruco, Capanaparo, Arauca and Arichuna rivers, while going east, the Guariquito, Manapire, Zuata, Pao and Caris rivers also join the course of the great Orinoco river, from its northern slope.

== Economy ==
The economy of the Llanera region is dominated by agricultural and livestock activities and to a lesser extent by activities such as tourism. However, it remains a purely rural and sparsely populated region.

This is an area of special importance for the country's agriculture and livestock, especially with regard to cattle, pigs and goats. Agricultural activity was even more decisive before 1917, when oil exploitation began to take off. However, later on and because of the rural exodus, the primary sector lost importance at a national level, but it maintains a relative boom in the region.

== Political Division ==
=== Guarico State ===
It is located in the center of the country, in the region of Los Llanos, bordering Carabobo, Aragua and Miranda to the north, Anzoátegui State to the east, Bolivar and Apure to the south, and Barinas and Cojedes to the west. With almost 65 000 km² it is the fourth largest state - behind Bolivar, Amazonas and Apure - with 746 174 inhabitants in 2011, the ninth least populated.

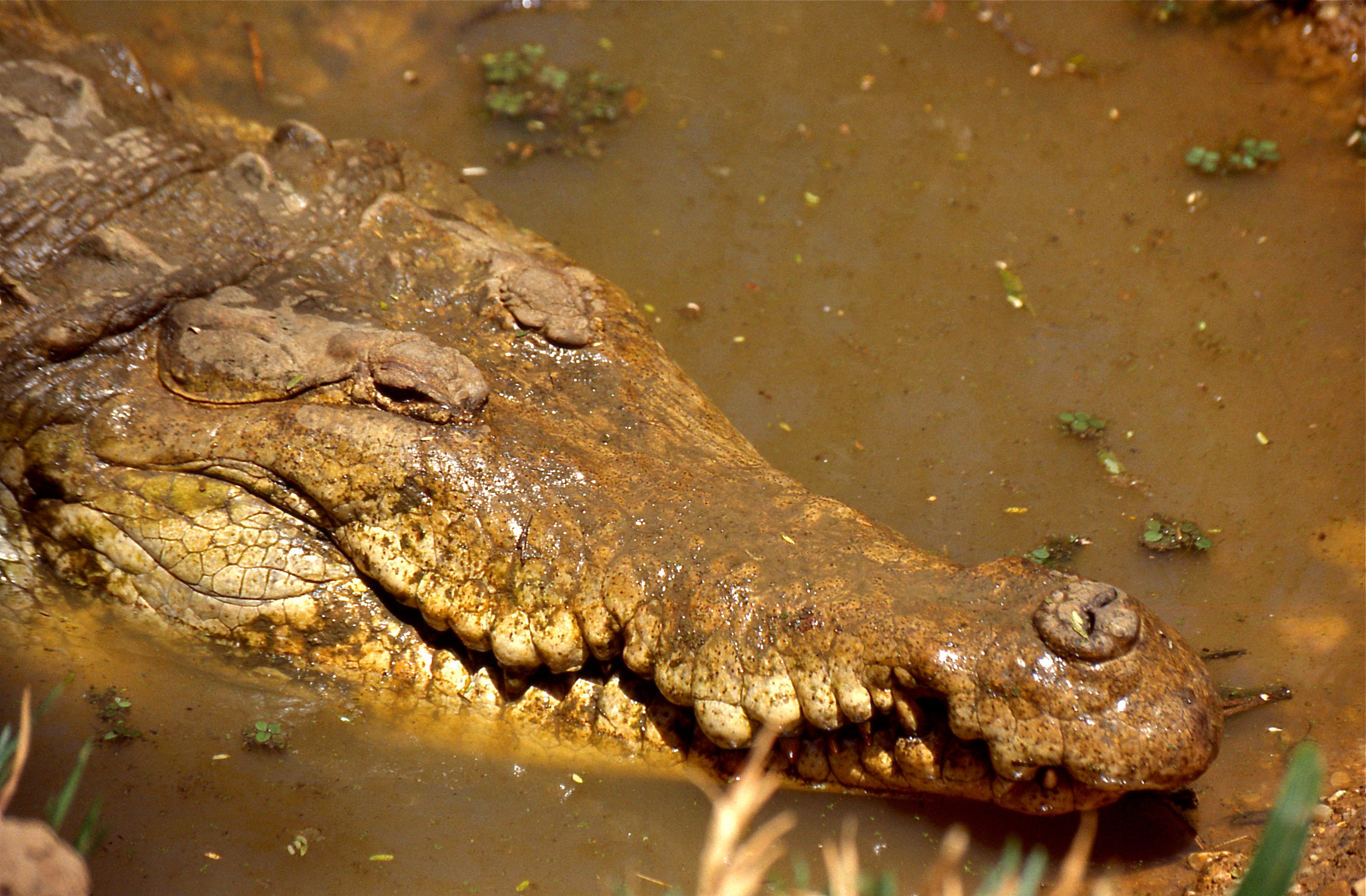
Orinoco Crocodile, Llanos Region

=== Apure State ===
Apure, this is the largest plain state in the region. Its plains are properly divided into three major parts: the low, middle, and high plains, as well as the low Apure, middle Apure, and high Apure. Its main economic activities are cattle raising followed by agriculture and fishing, the state is poor in production with only 11% of its entire territory in production. The most important cities are: San Fernando de Apure, Achagua, Elorza and Guasdualito. The state is crossed by numerous rivers of great length and width, all of which are part of the Orinoco basin. The Apure, the most important of these, is also the main Venezuelan tributary of the Orinoco from its left bank, and the second longest in the country: it runs for about 1000 km between its source and its mouth. The cattle sector is basically specialized in the production of cattle, concentrating about 30% of the heads of cattle in the whole national territory.

== Gallery ==
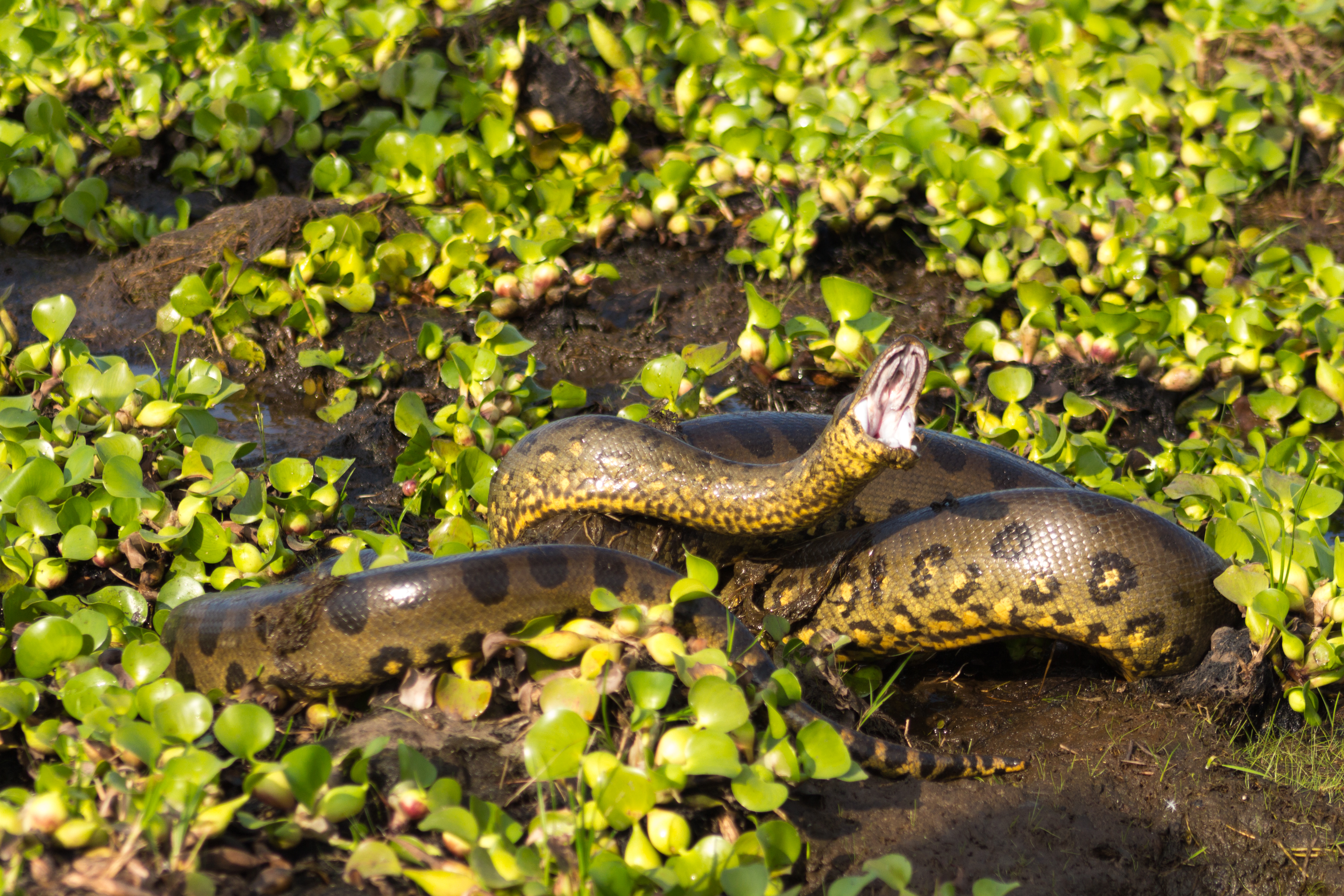
Anaconda in Los Llanos Region

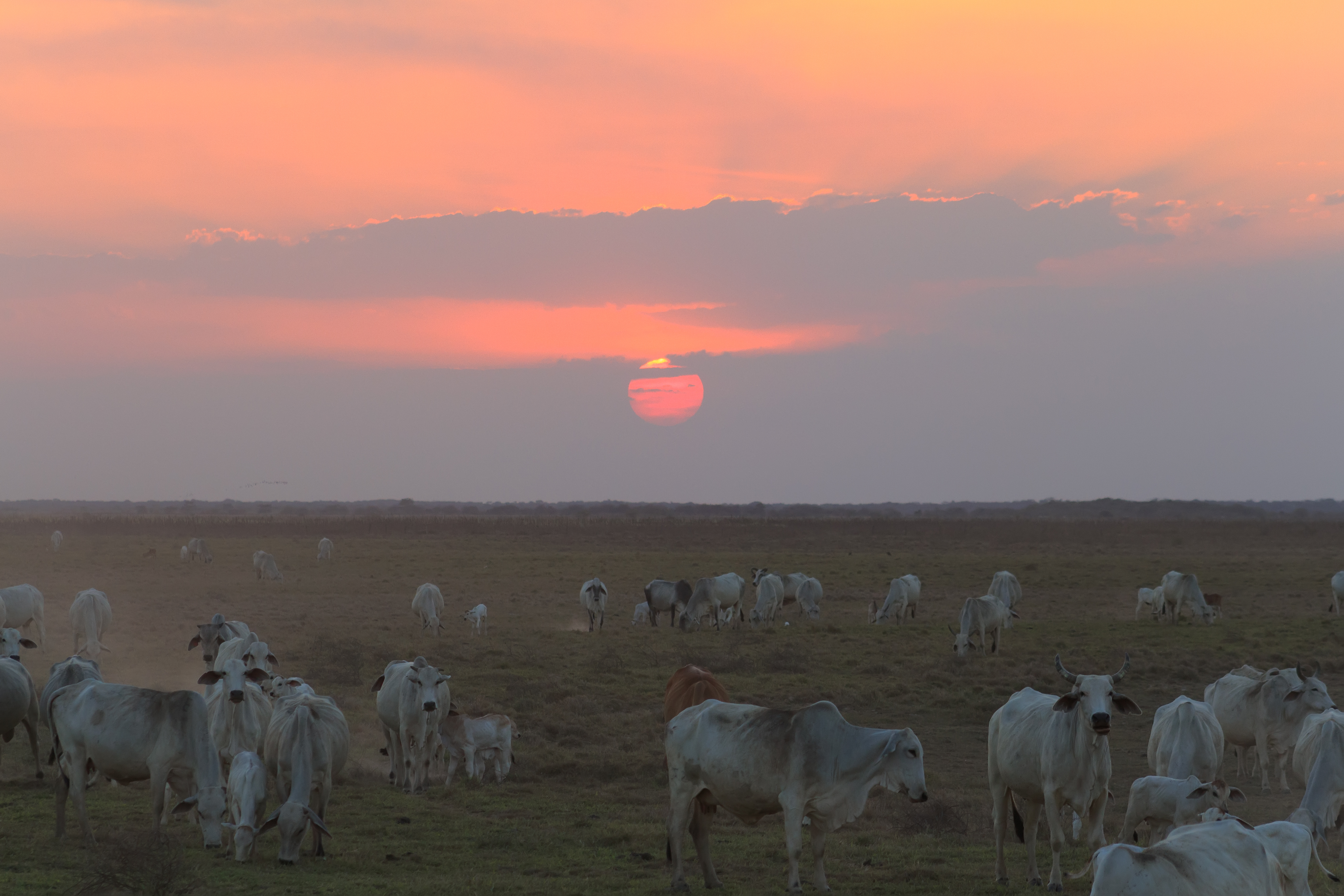
Cattle in Hato El Cedral, Apure State

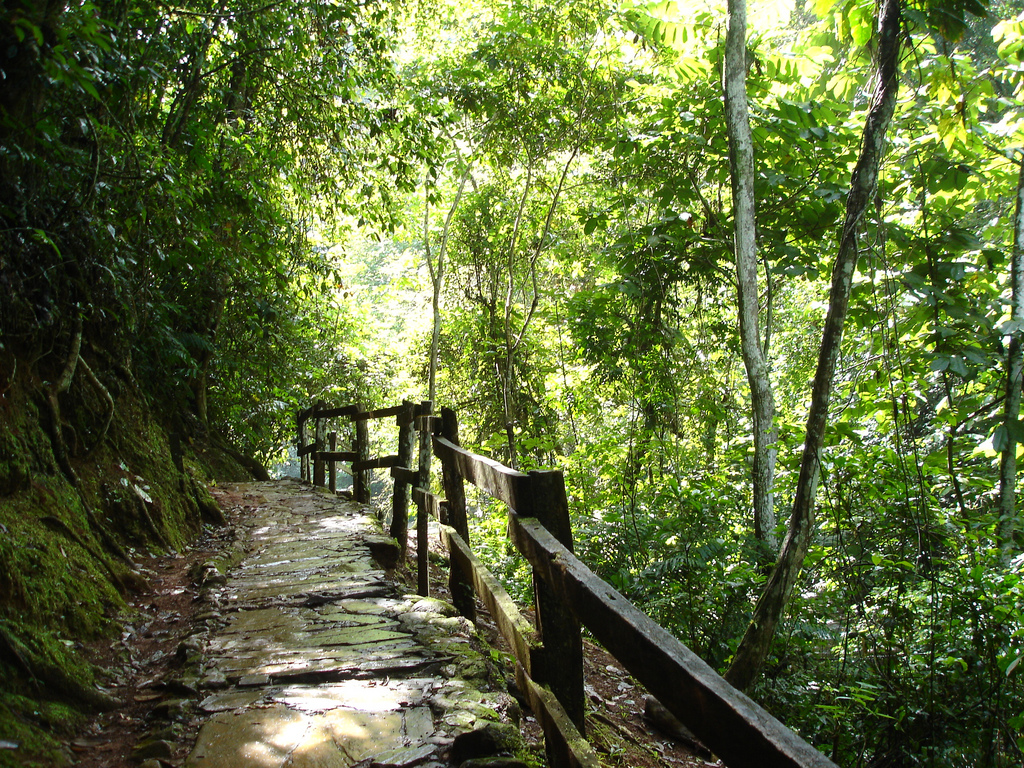
Guatopo National Park, Guárico State

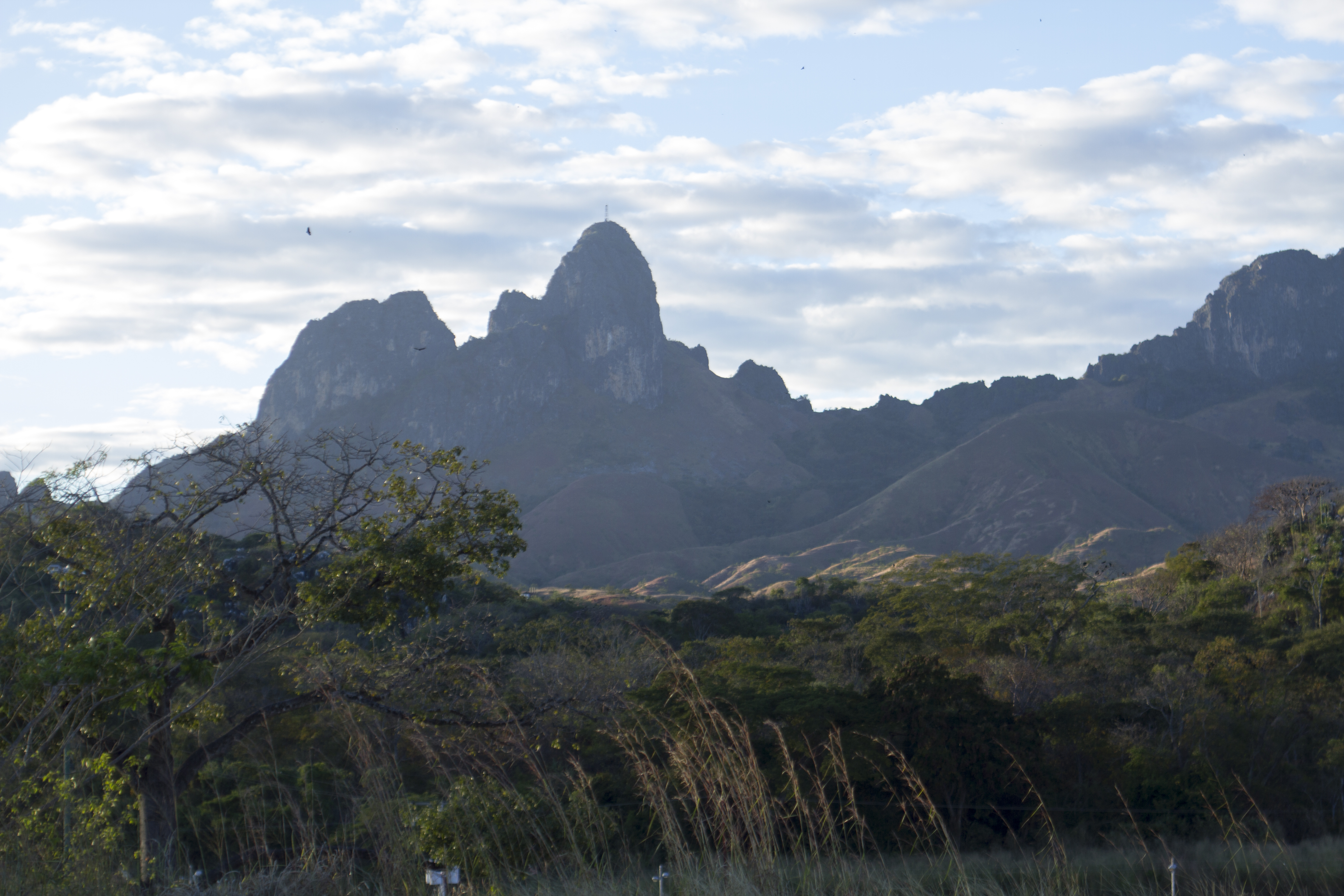
Morros de San Juan, Guárico State

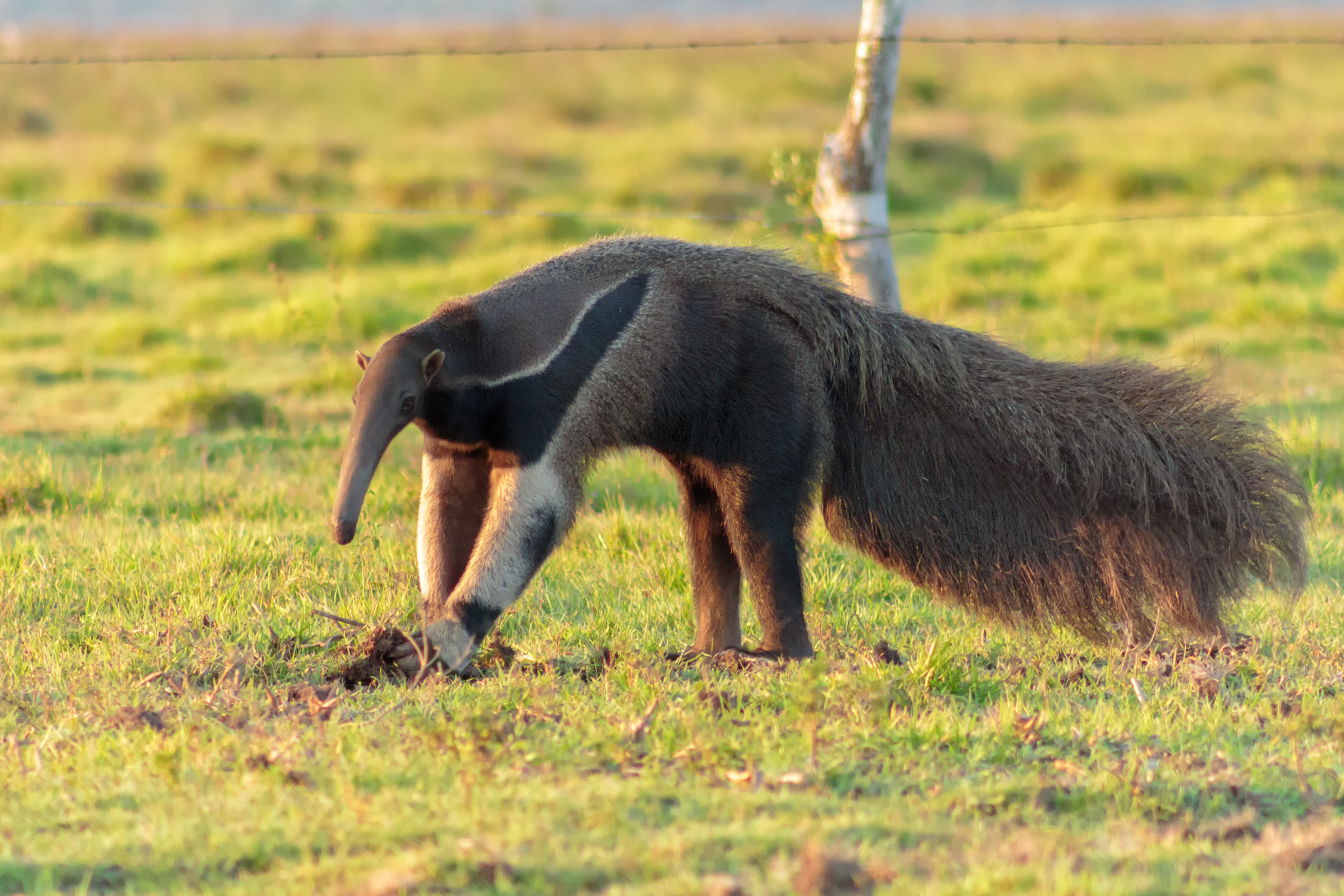
Giant anteater, Los Llanos Region
