= Capital Region, Venezuela =

Administrative region of Venezuela

Coordinates: 10°19′N 66°39′W

Capital Region in Venezuela

The Capital Region (Spanish: Región Capital) is one of the nine administrative regions of Venezuela. It includes the states of Miranda and La Guaira, as well as the Capital District. In 2011, the population of the region was reported to be more than 5 million people.

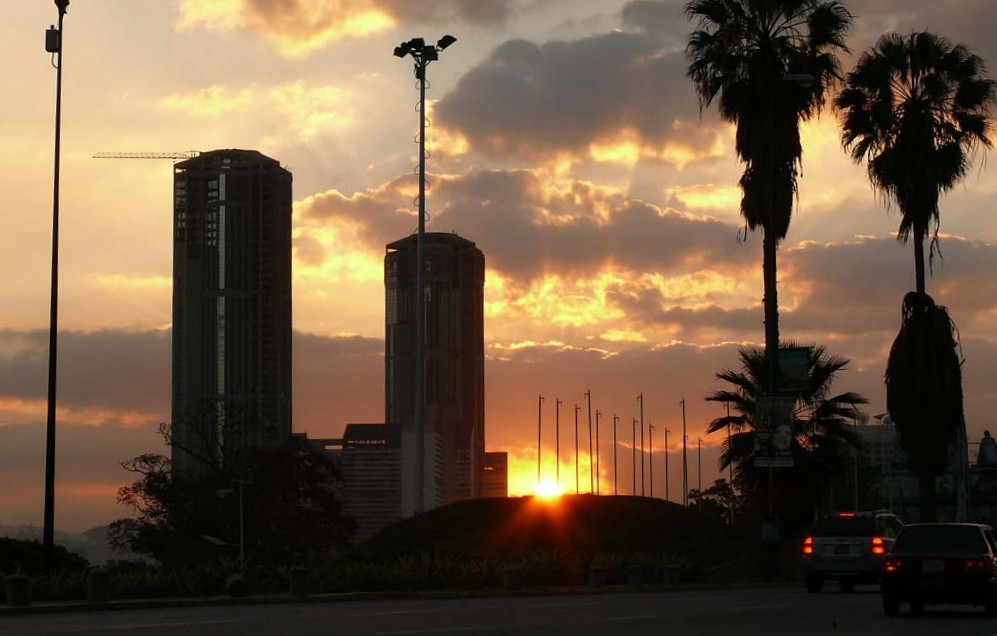
Parque Central Towers, Caracas

The Caribbean Sea forms the region’s northern boundary. The other regions which it borders are the Central Region to the west, the Llanos Region to the south, and the Northeastern Region to the west.

== History ==
The region is one of the first eight regions to be created and the presidential decree № 72 of 1969 made its formation official because of this.

In the 1970s, it formed, together with the states of Carabobo and Aragua, the so-called North-Central Coastal Region. In the following decade, after a legal reform, those states were separated to form the Central Region and thus the Capital Region was formed given the geographical location of the city of Caracas, the capital of Venezuela.

== Physical aspects ==
=== Relief ===
The region is dominated by mountainous forms, belonging to the central section of the Coastal Range.

=== Climate ===
The regional climate is like this:

- Coastal zone; semi-arid tropical climate.
- Windward depression; tropical monsoon climate.
- Caracas Valley; tropical climate of altitude.
- Mountainous zone; tropical climate of altitude.

=== Hydrography ===
The most important river in the region is the Tuy River (239 km), which originates from the Codazzi Peak and the Guaire River

== Economy ==
Its economy is based on industry and commerce, it has an important port such as La Guaira, which allows commercialization with other countries. This brings as consequence the increase of the population in this region due to the opportunity for the commercialization of products and the offer of jobs.

Despite the fact that the capital of the country is located in this region, a part of the primary sector that has survived is predominant, such as cocoa planting in the areas of Barlovento in the state of Miranda.

The state of Miranda is the area of greatest agricultural activity in the region, highlighting the cultivation of cocoa, sugar cane, poultry and raising cattle and pigs.

It is one of the 9 regions in which Venezuela is divided, has a large economy that allows industries to continue growing and has some very important centers, both financial and industrial.

== Gallery ==
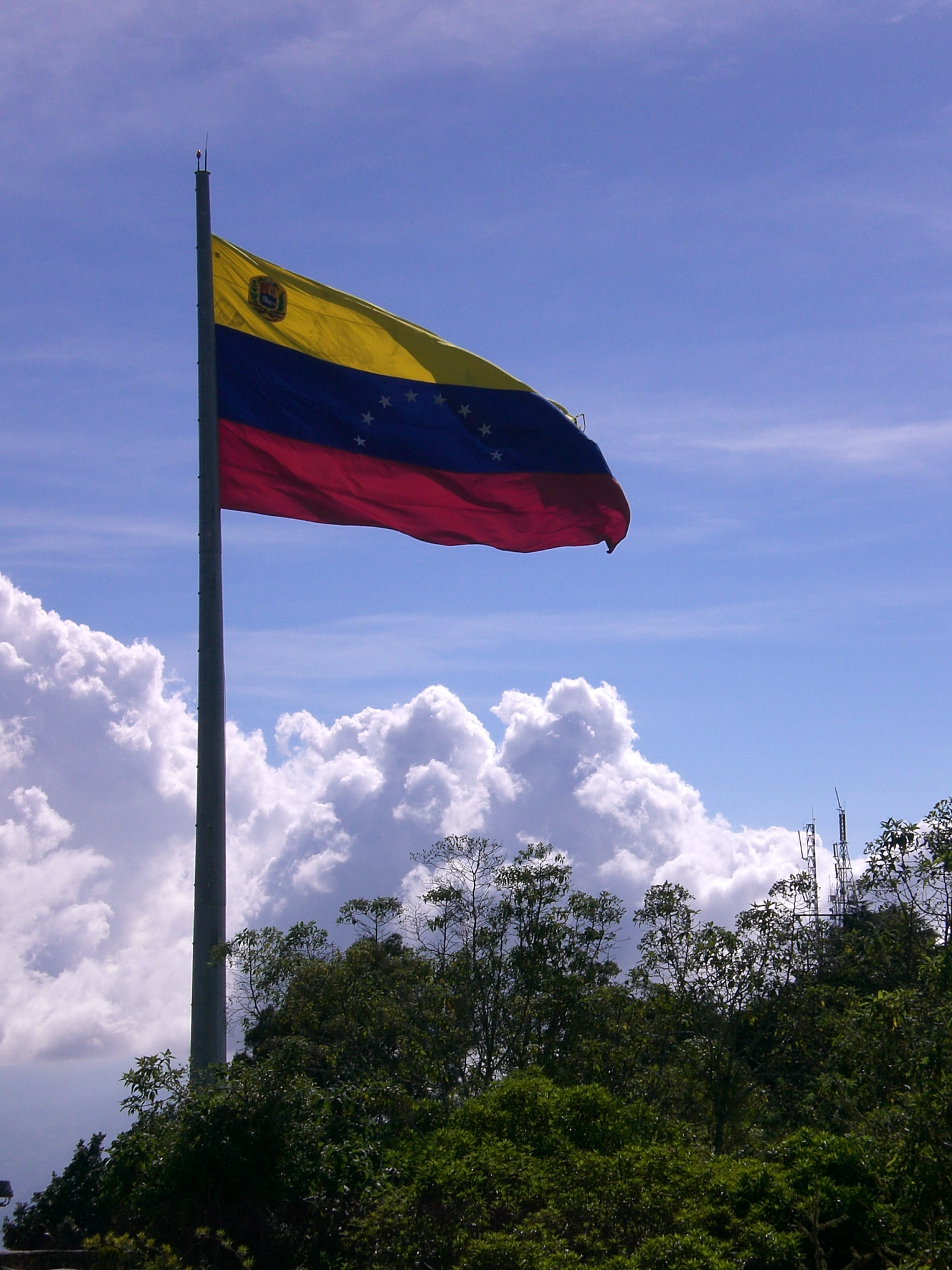
El Ávila National Park

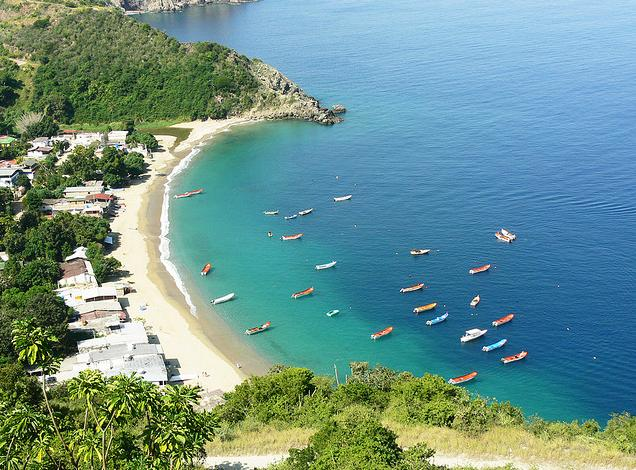
Vargas State Beach

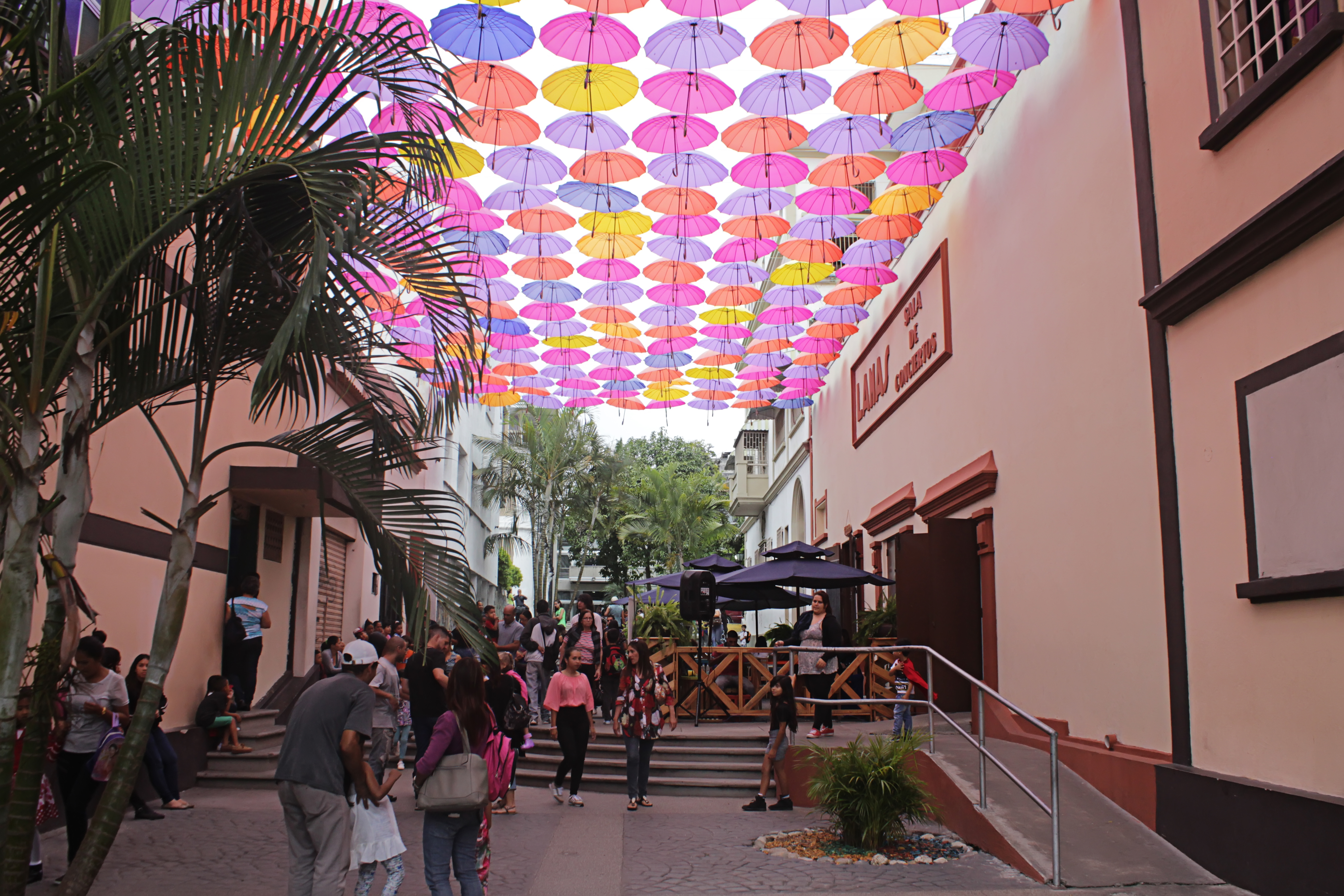
Los Teques Miranda State

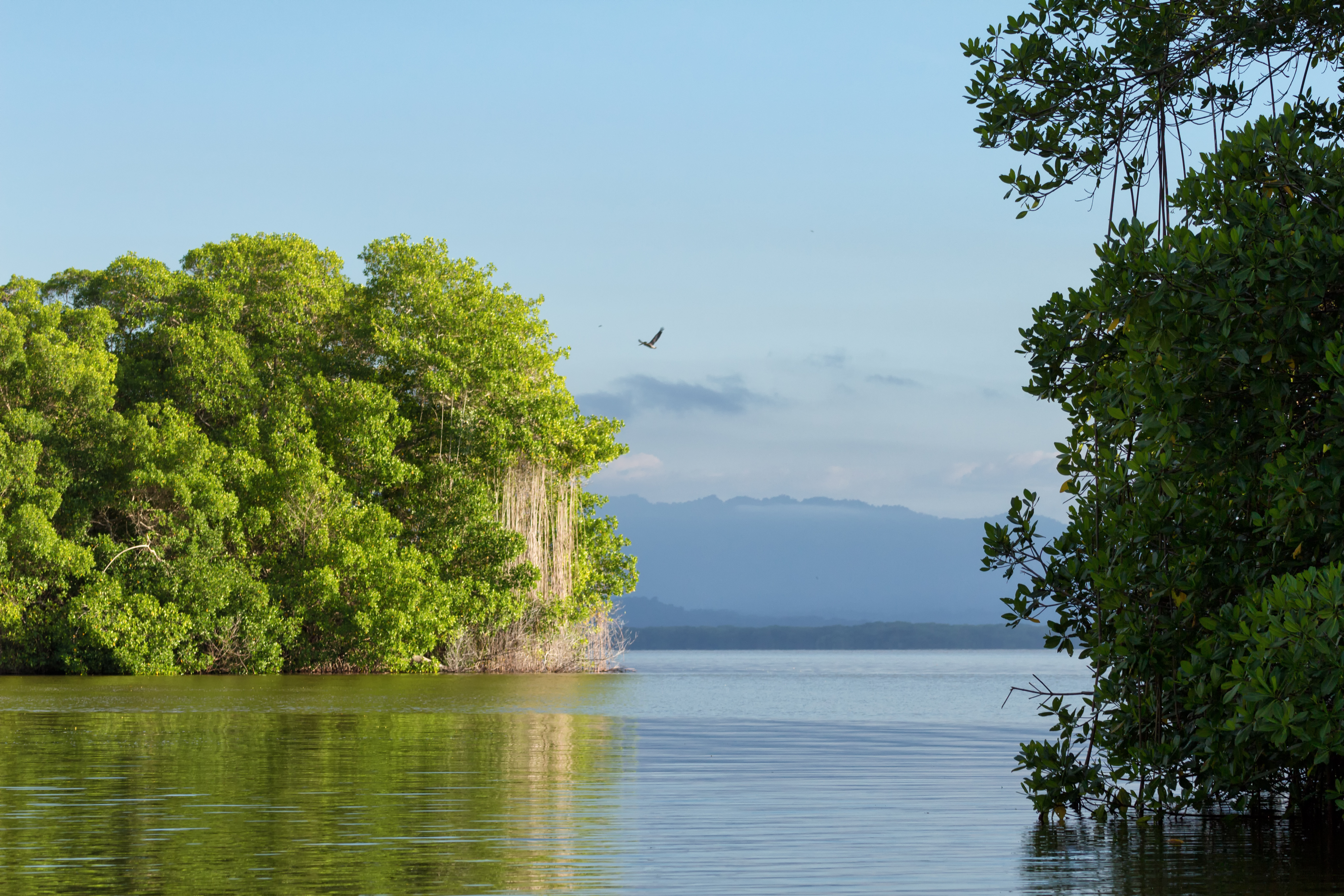
Tacarigua Lagoon National Park

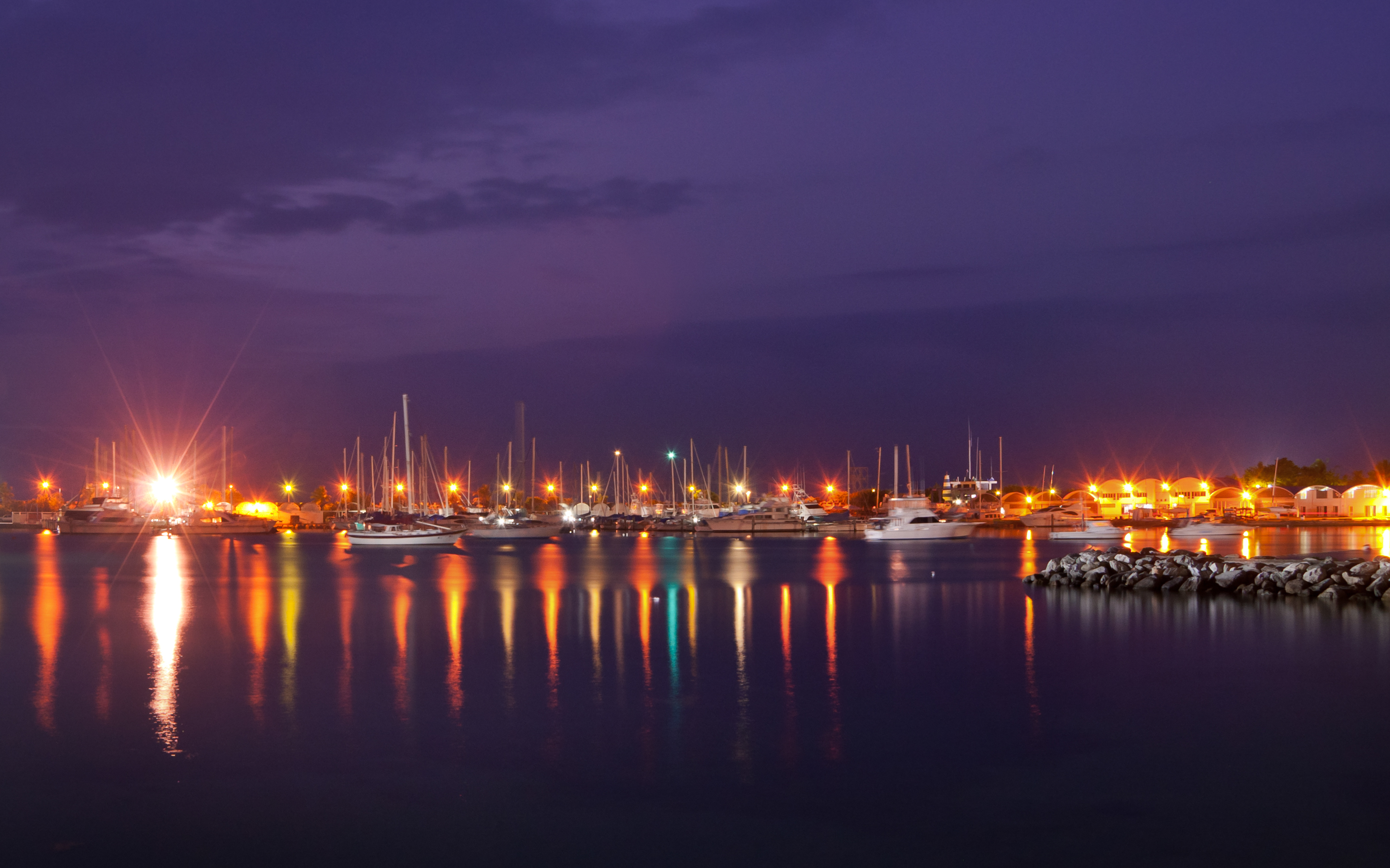
Naiguatá, Vargas State
