= Central Region, Venezuela =

Administrative region of Venezuela

Coordinates: 10°10′N 68°00′W

Central Region in Venezuela

The Central Region (Spanish: Región Central) is one of the nine administrative regions of Venezuela. The states of which it consists are Aragua, Carabobo, and Cojedes.

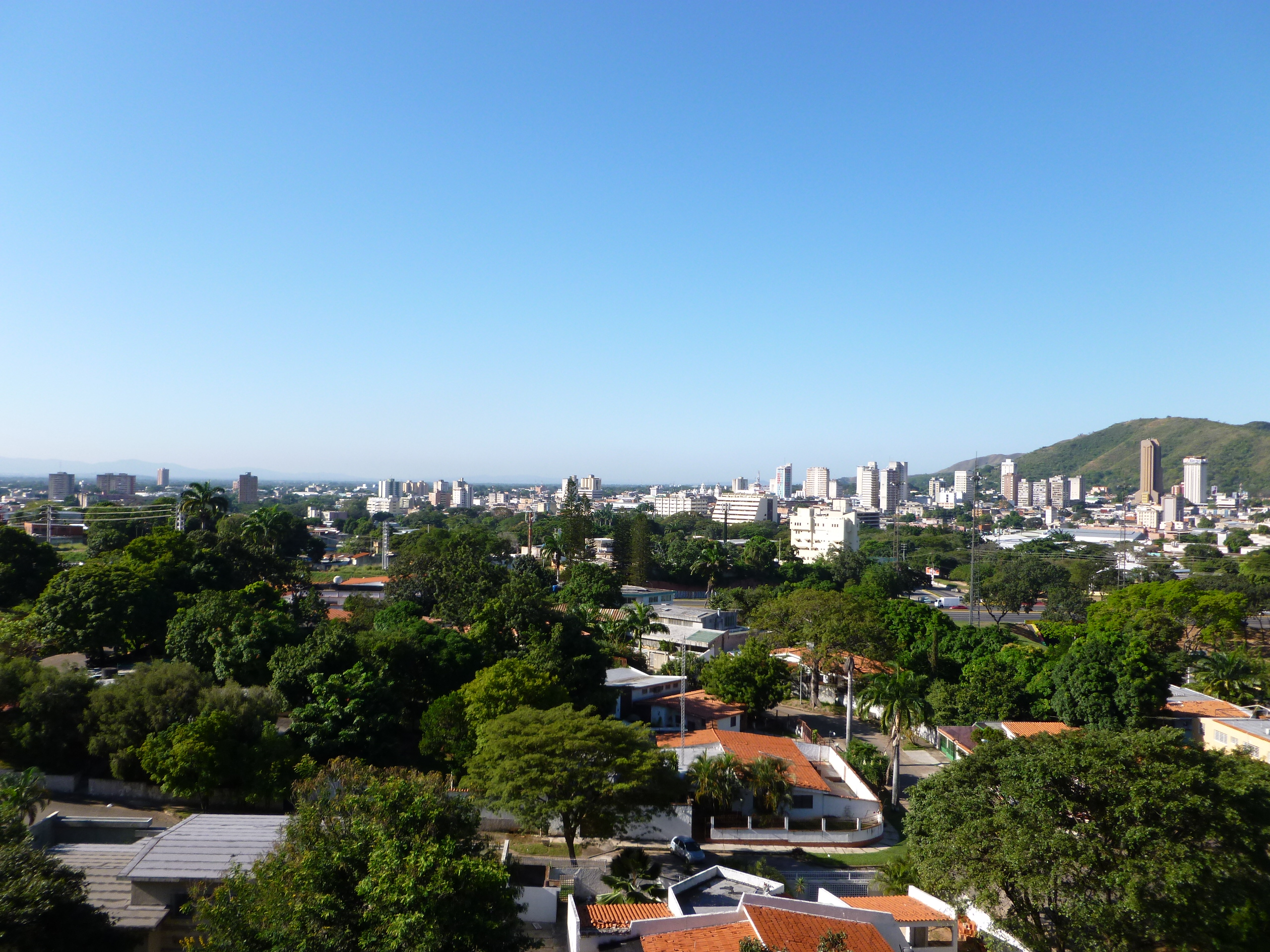
Valencia, Carabobo State

The Caribbean Sea forms the region's northern boundary. The other regions which it borders are the Capital Region to the northeast, the Llanos Region to the southeast, the Andean Region to the south, and the Central-Western Region to the west. The main and most populated city in the Central Region is Valencia in the state of Carabobo.

== History ==
The region was created in the presidential decree N.° 72 of 1969. As in the whole country, after the beginning of the democratic era, a regionalization policy begins to develop. By 1969, thanks to the presidential decree, the first legal element from which regionalization in the region and throughout the country would begin. This decree creates the Central Region as well as 8 other regions in the country, in addition to laying the foundations for the creation of different regional organizations.

== Geography ==
The region is made up of the states of Aragua, Carabobo and Cojedes. It occupies an area of 26,000 km^{2}.

== Gallery ==
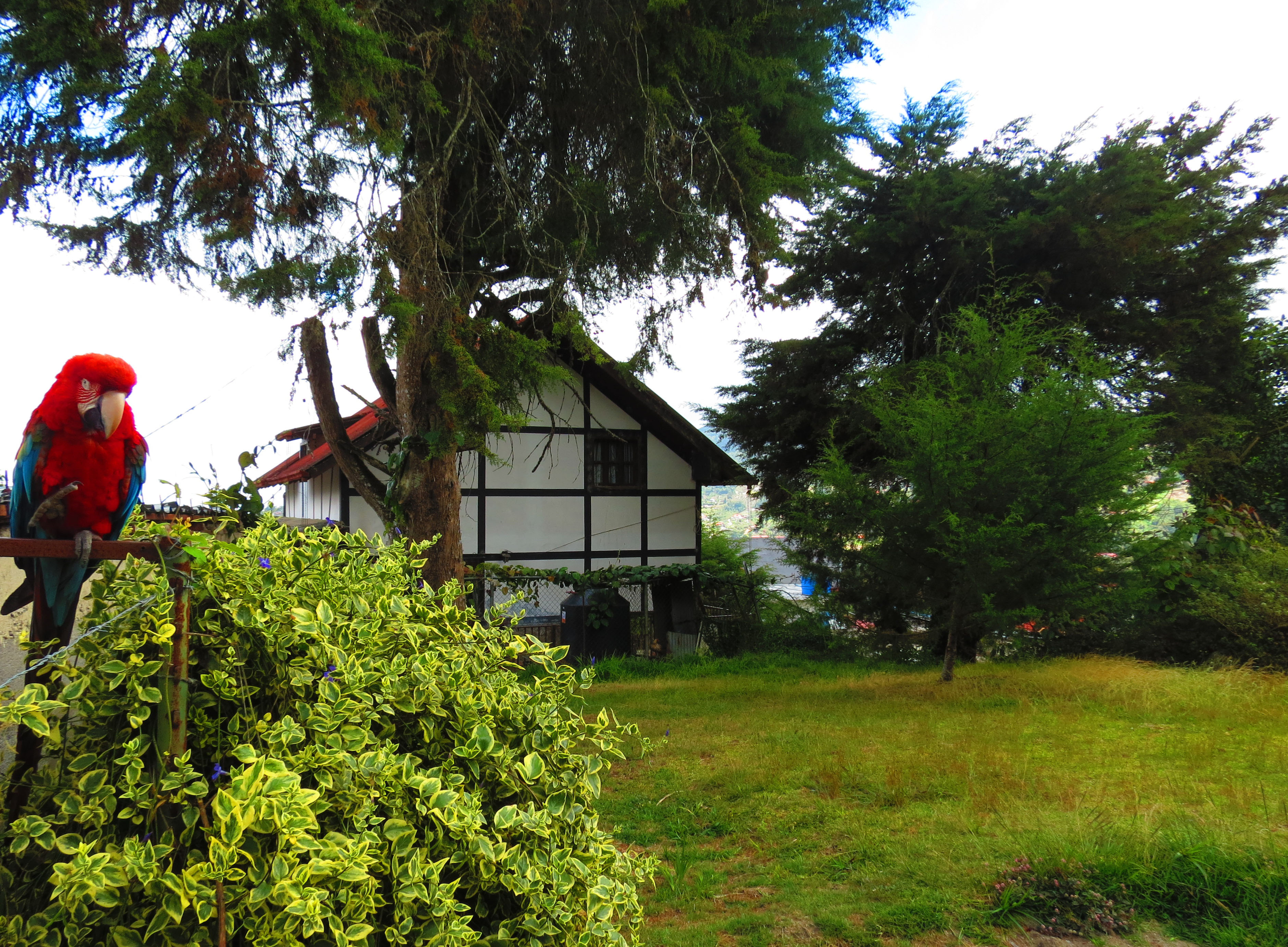
Colonia Tovar, Aragua State

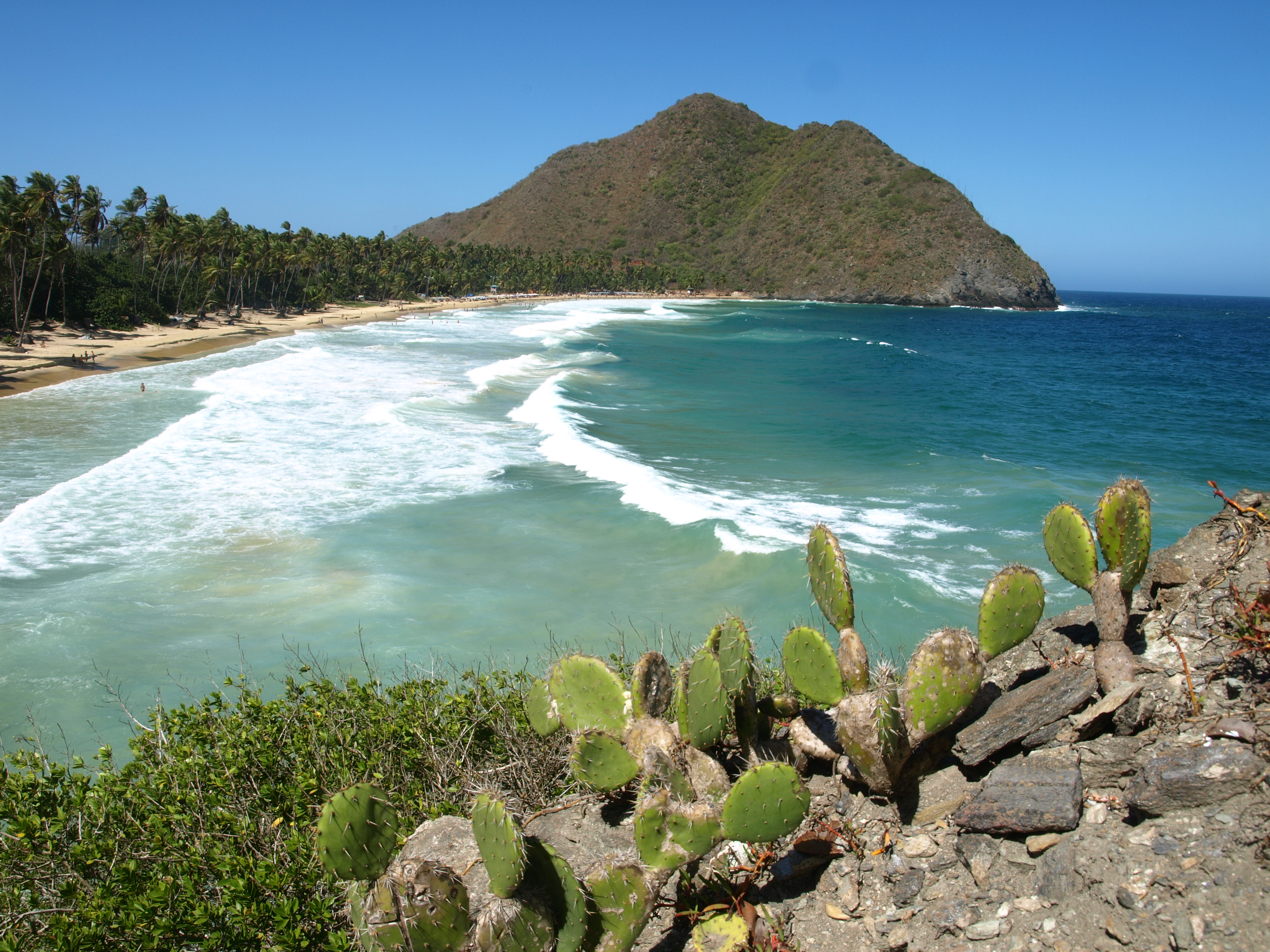
Choroní, Aragua State

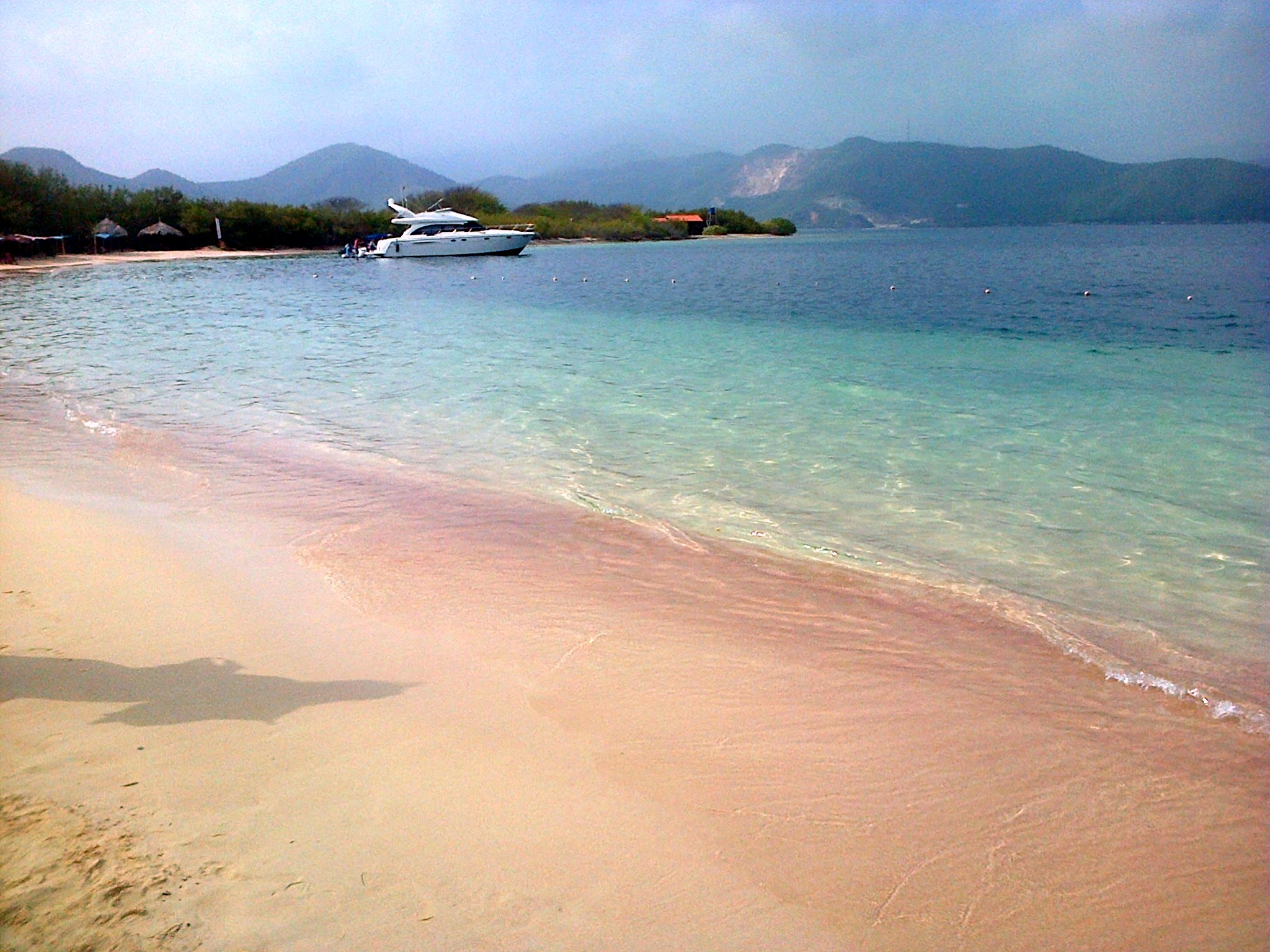
Isla Larga, Carabobo State

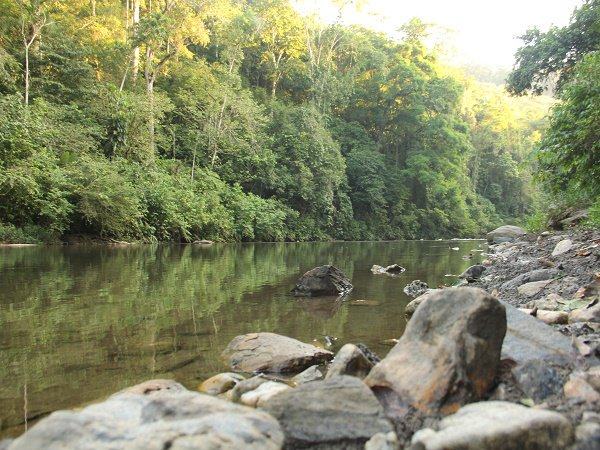
Tirgua National Park, Cojedes State

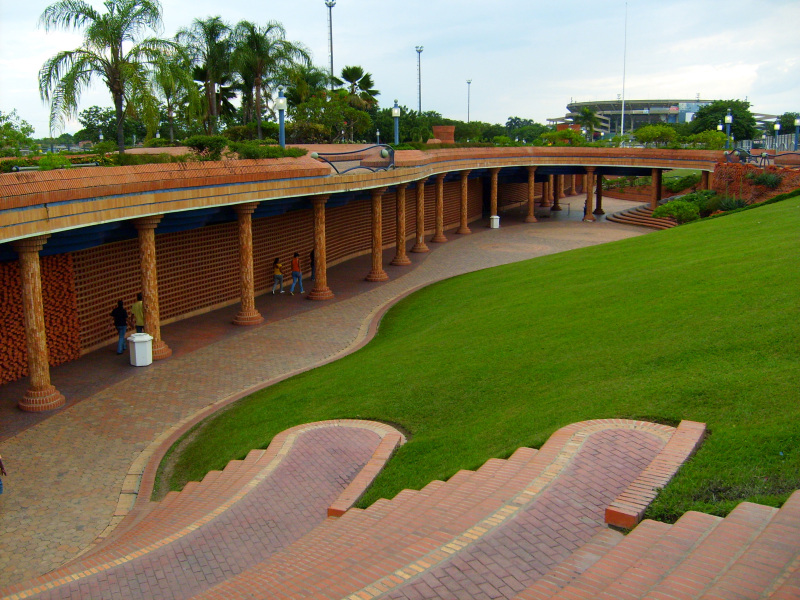
Valencia Metro, Carabobo State
