= Regions of Venezuela =

Two groupings of Venezuela's states, capital district, and federal dependencies

The Regions of Venezuela (Spanish: Regiones de Venezuela) are two groupings of Venezuela's states, capital district, and federal dependencies. Venezuela's natural regions (Regiones naturales) are divided by natural geography, and administrative regions (Regiones político-administrativas) are delineated for the purpose of regional administration.

== Administrative regions ==
Administrative regions (Regiones político-administrativas) are grouped from Venezuela's neighboring states, federal dependencies, and the capital district for the purpose of local administration in the process of regional development. The Political-Administrative regions were created from a decree on 11 June 1969 and have been modified since their creation, and there are currently nine regions.

Administrative regions of Venezuela: Andean Region Capital Region Central Region Central-Western Region Northeastern Region Guayana Region Insular Region Llanos Region Zulian Region

Administrative Region	Population¹	Area²	States
Andean Region	3,911,278	56,700 km^{2}	Barinas, Mérida, Táchira, Trujillo and the Páez Municipality of Apure
Capital Region	4,687,002	9,879 km^{2}	Miranda, La Guaira, Capital District (Caracas)
Central Region	3,851,290	26,464 km^{2}	Aragua, Carabobo, Cojedes
Central-Western Region	3,703,675	66,900 km^{2}	Falcón, Lara, Portuguesa, Yaracuy
Northeastern Region	3,165,217	84,030 km^{2}	Anzoátegui, Monagas, Sucre
Guayana Region	1,776,545	458,344 km^{2}	Bolívar, Amazonas, Delta Amacuro
Insular Region	439,900	1,492 km^{2}	Nueva Esparta, Federal Dependencies
Llanos Region	1,181,650	141,486 km^{2}	Apure (excluding the Páez Municipality), Guárico
Zulian Region	3,520,376	63,100 km^{2}	Zulia

Notes:

1. Population figures are 2005 estimates
2. The area of the Páez municipality has, for the time being, been incorrectly counted here as belonging to the Llanos Region, rather than the Andean Region.

== Natural regions ==
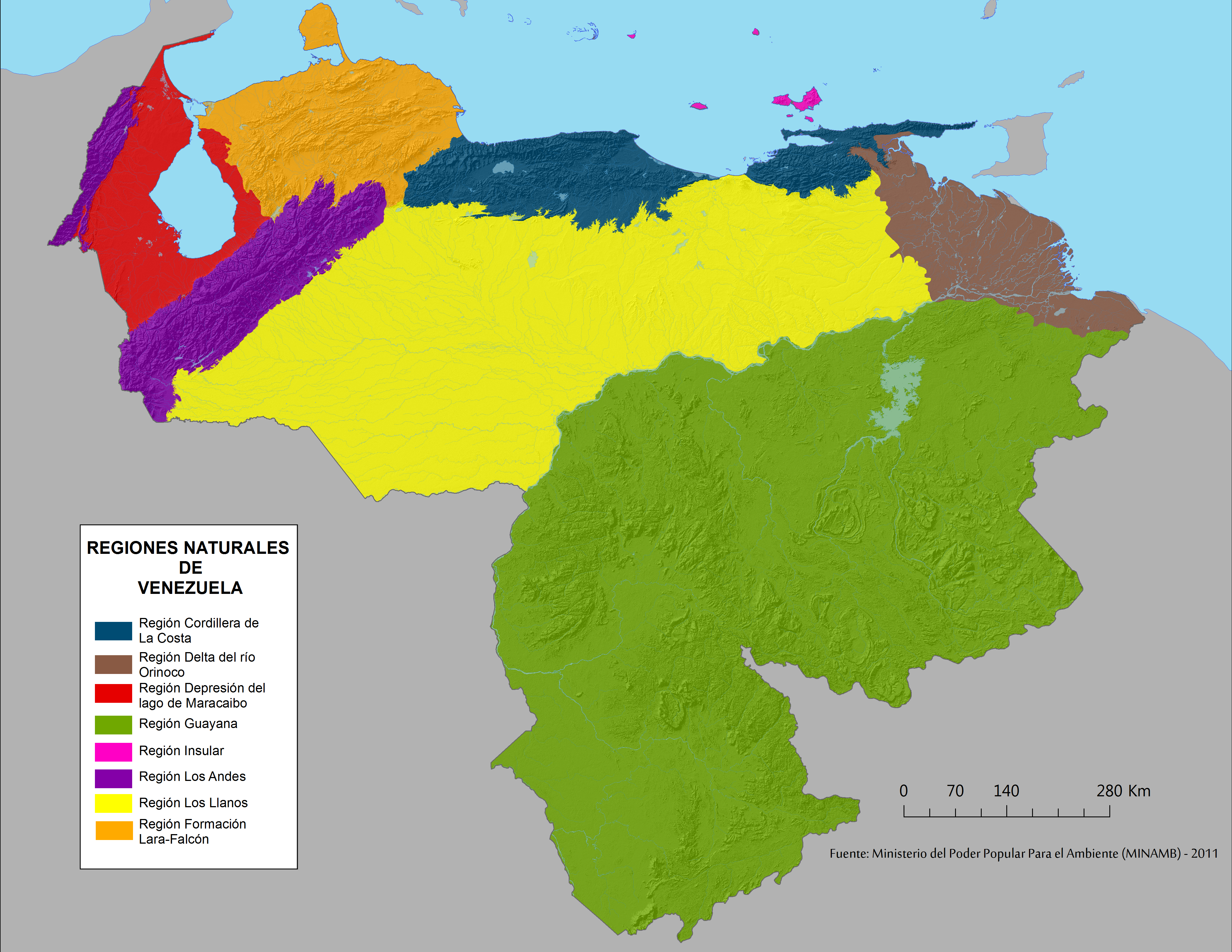
Natural Regions of Venezuela

Natural regions (Regiones naturales) are grouped based on a natural region, regardless of population or development, and formed from geo-physical criteria such as geological constitution, relief, climate, hydrography, vegetation, soils, and others. Venezuela is considered one of 18 Megadiverse countries by Conservation International, and the Natural regions do not always correspond exactly to the borders of the states.

Venezuela is divided into eight Natural regions:

- Andean Natural Region
- Caribbean Mountain-System Natural Region
- Guayana Natural Region
- Insular Natural Region
- Lara-Falcón Hill-System Natural Region
- Los Llanos Natural Region
- Lake Maracaibo Lowlands Natural Region
- Orinoco Delta Natural Region
