= Northeastern Region, Venezuela =

Administrative region of Venezuela

Coordinates: 10.1333°N 64.6833°W

Northeastern Region in Venezuela

The Northeastern Region (Spanish: Región Nor Oriental) is one of the nine administrative regions of Venezuela. It comprises the states of Anzoátegui, Monagas, and Sucre.

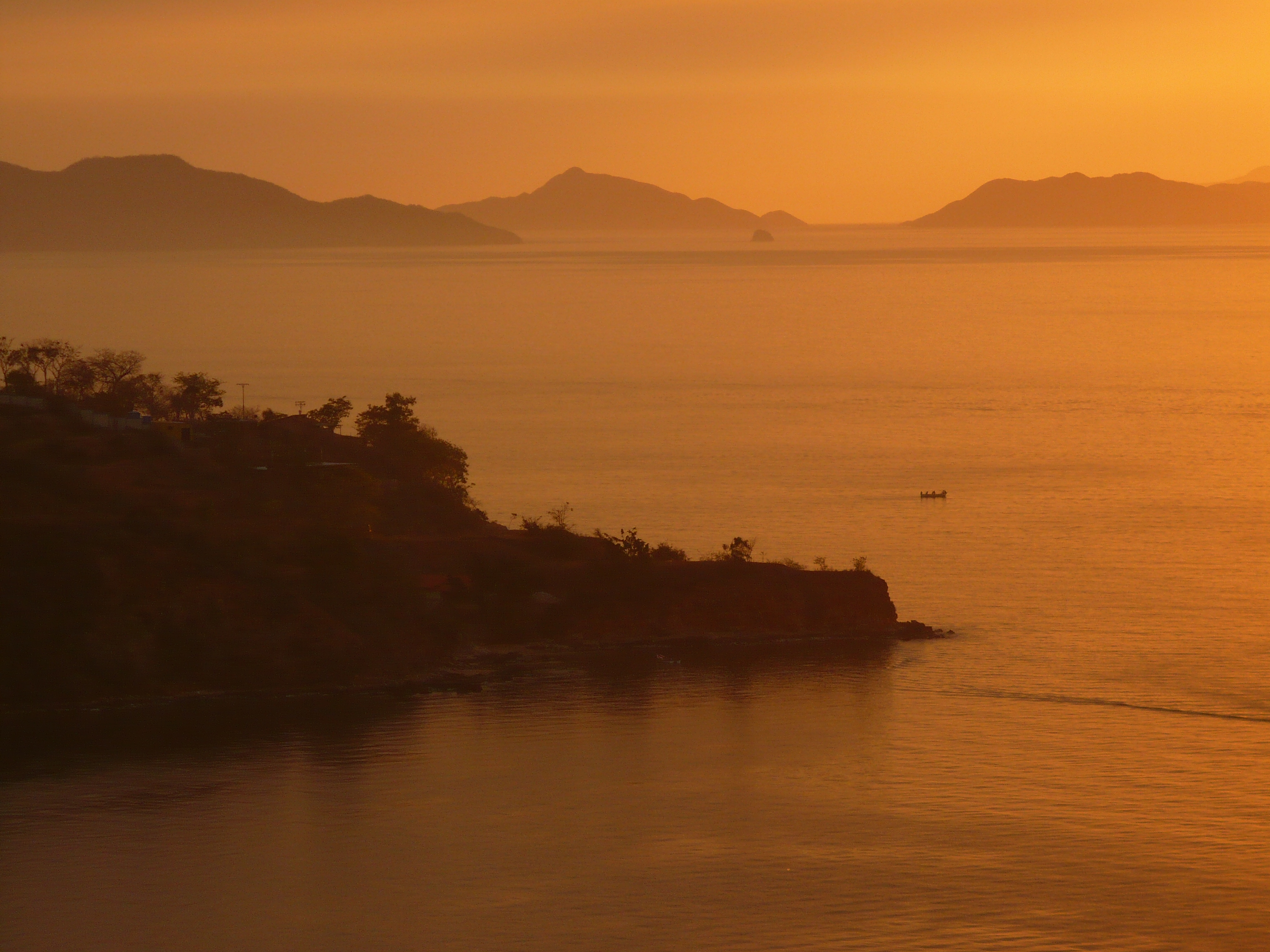
Sunset in Mochima National Park

The Caribbean Sea forms the region's northern boundary. The other regions which it borders are the Capital Region to the northwest, the Llanos Region to the west, and the Guayana Region to the south and east.

== History ==
The state of Sucre has great historical importance, because it was the first Venezuelan land touched by the Italian navigator, Christopher Columbus. Columbus, impressed by the greenness of the flora, the coasts and the crystalline water of its beaches, called the place "Tierra de Gracia" or 'Land of Grace'.

While the State of Anzoategui was initially called Province of Barcelona in reference to the Spanish city of the same name, while the capital kept its original name (Barcelona) the territory received the name of a Venezuelan general.

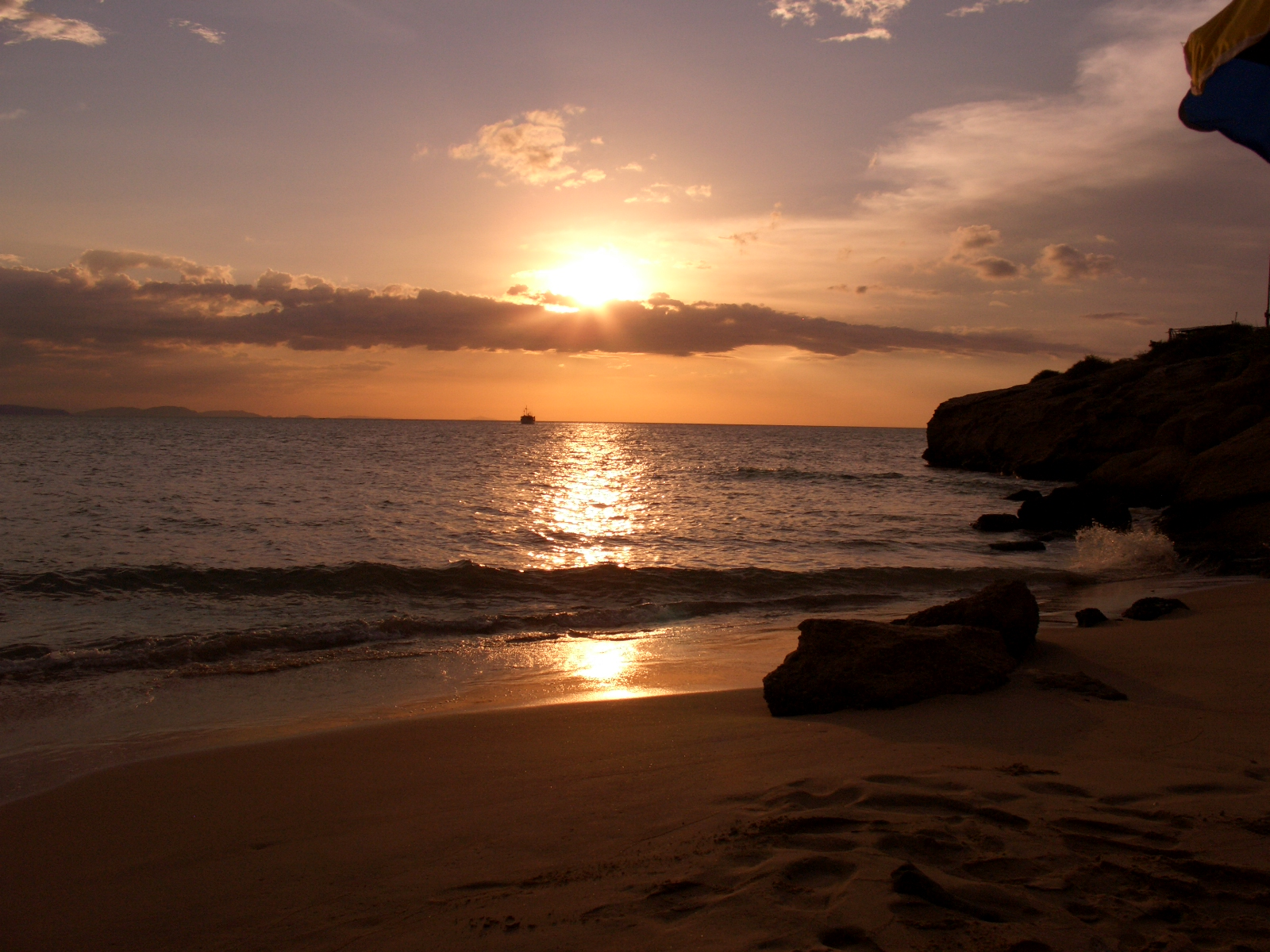
Araya Peninsula

In 1856, the Province of Maturín was created, separated from that of Cumaná. By 1864 the Maturín State was ratified. But in 1879, Monagas was annexed to the State of Oriente and, from 1891 to 1898, it belonged to the State of Bermúdez.

In 1904, Maturín became the capital of the Monagas district of Bermúdez State, whose capital was Cumaná. In 1909, Monagas State was created with its current boundaries. In honor of General José Tadeo Monagas.

== Demographics ==
The population of the north-eastern region amounts to 3,316,182 inhabitants, representing 12 per cent of the national population; it is distributed over a territory of 84,000 km^{2}, determining a population density equal to 39.5 inhabitants per km^{2}.

== Gallery ==
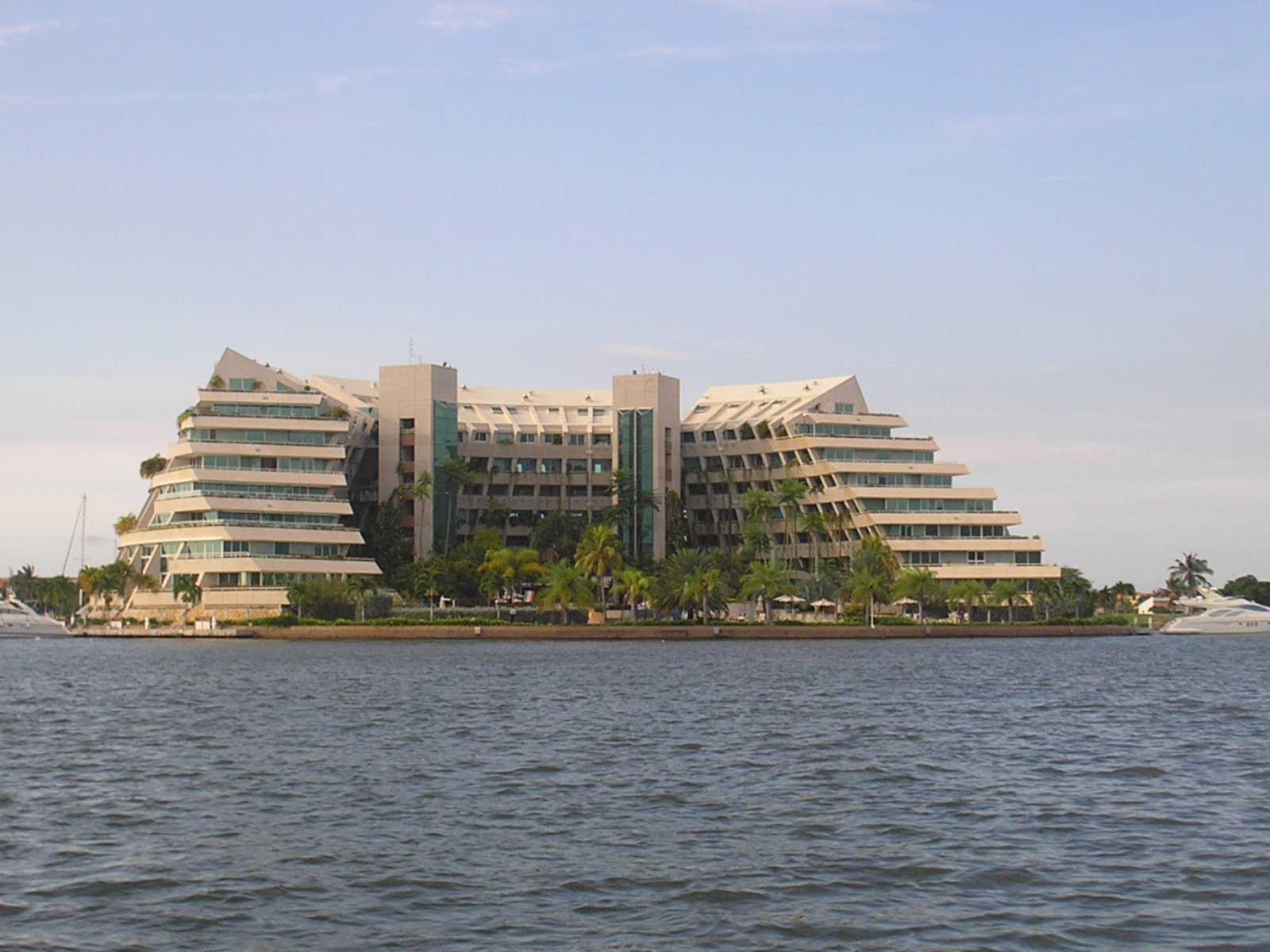
Paraíso Island, Lechería, Anzoátegui State

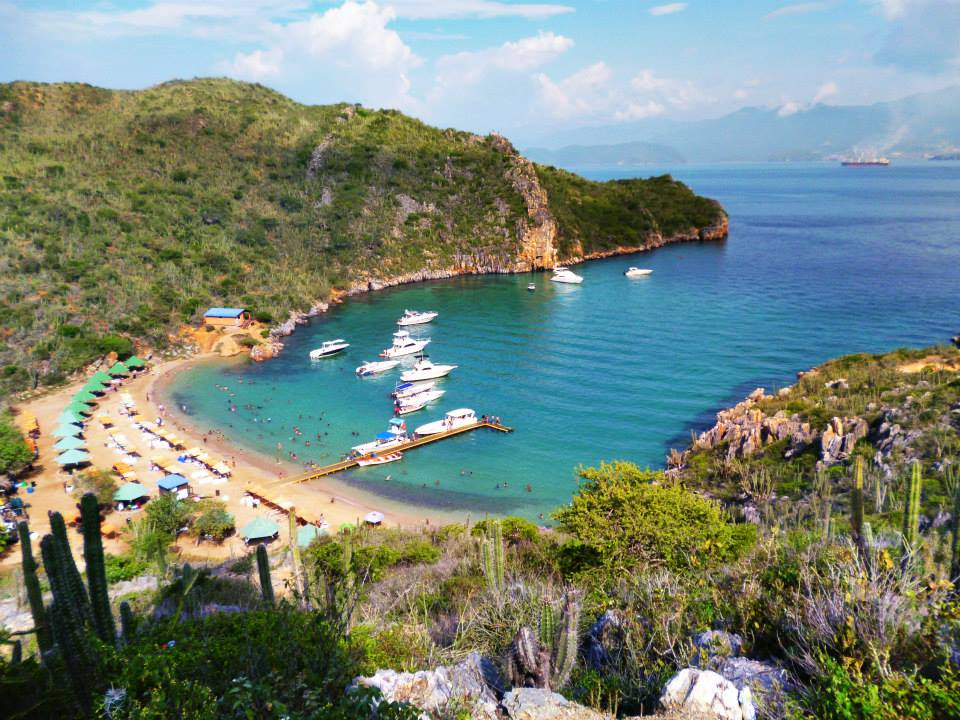
Isla El Faro Mochima National Park

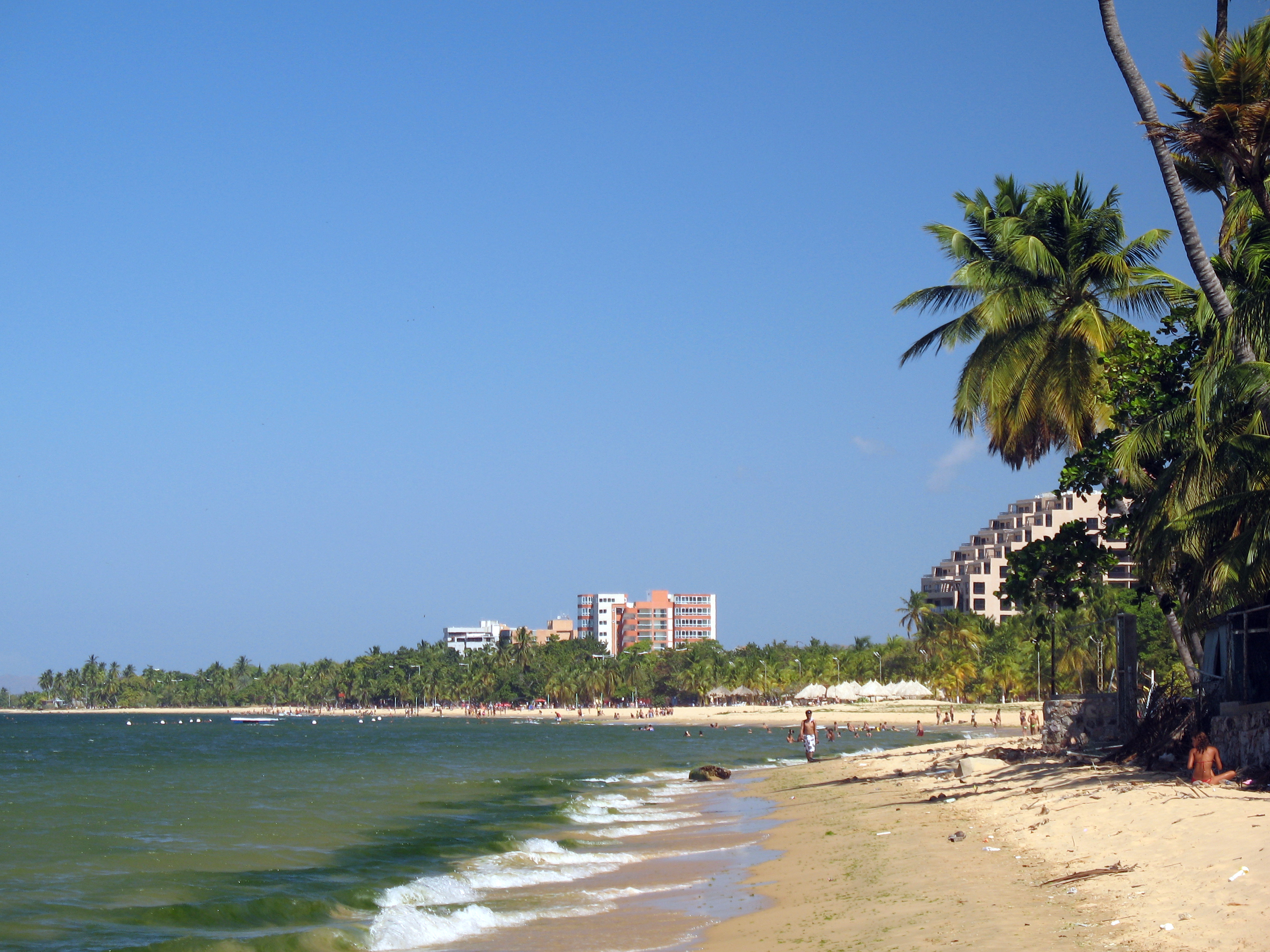
San Luis Beach, Sucre State

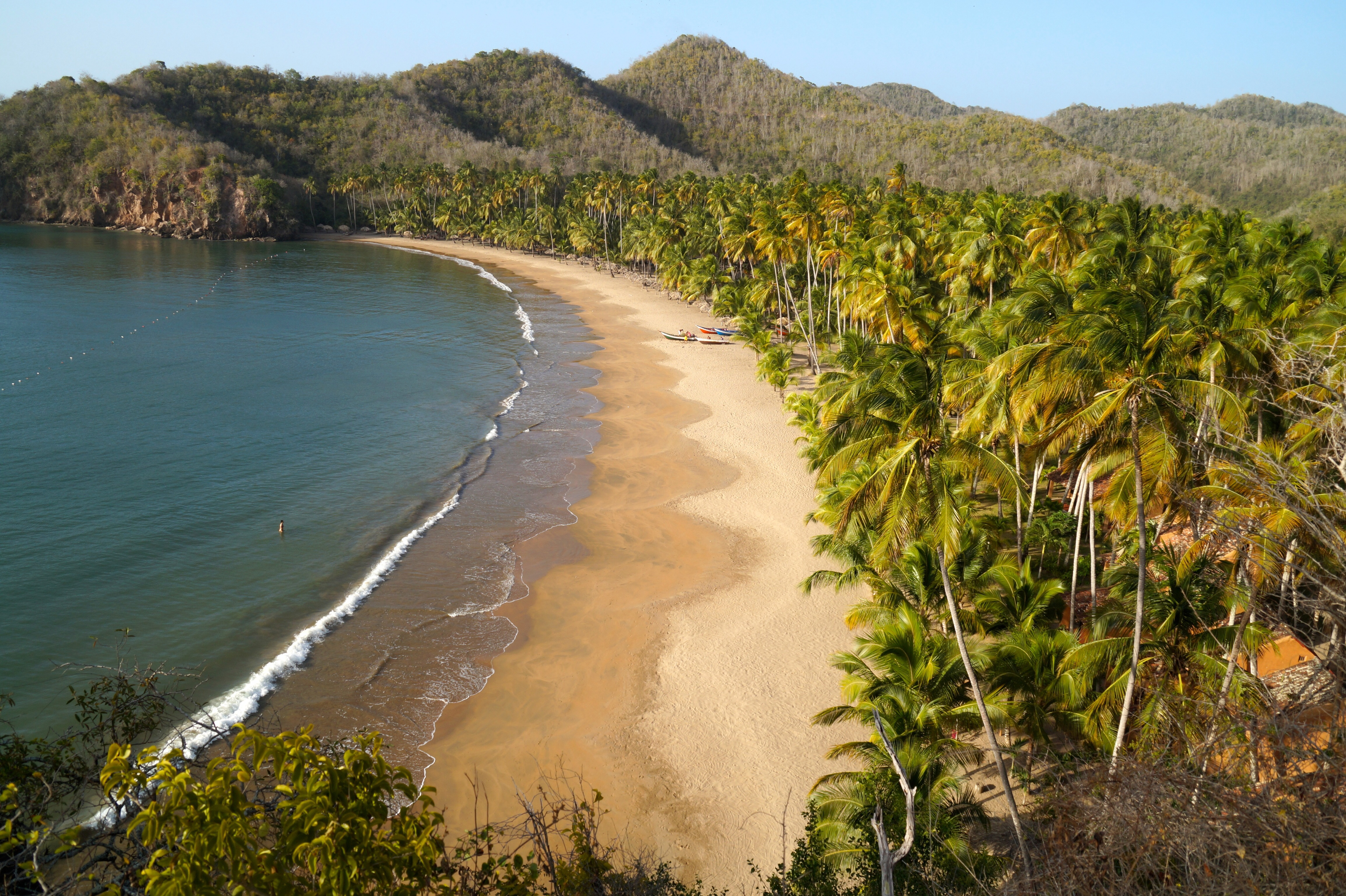
Medina Beach, Paria Peninsula

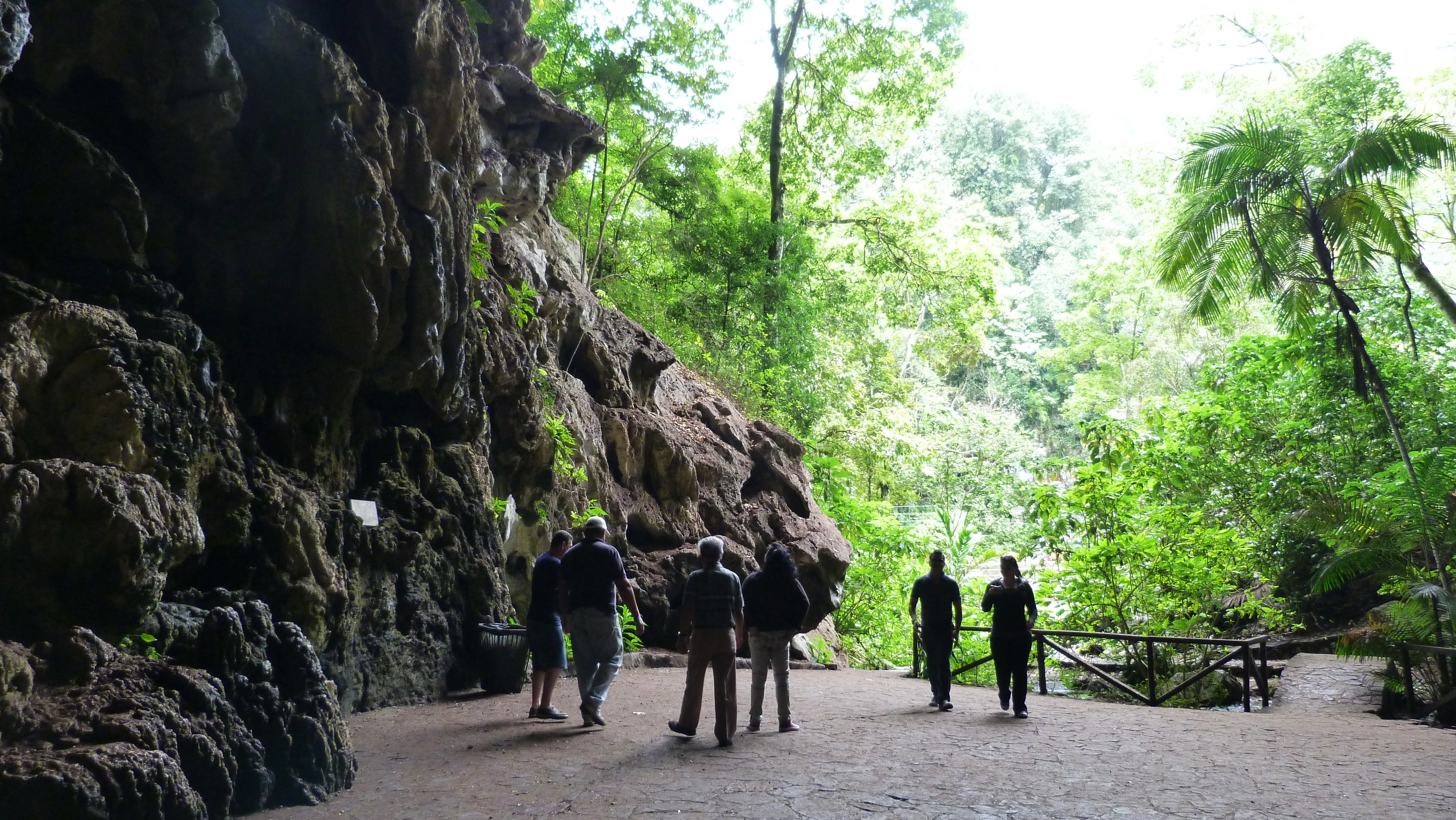
Guácharo Cave National Park, Monagas State
