= Zulian Region, Venezuela =

Administrative region of Venezuela

Coordinates: 9.863°N 72.502°W

Zulian Region, in the west, is the region colored in red

The Zulian Region (Spanish: Región Zuliana) is one of the nine administrative regions of Venezuela. This region is coterminous with Zulia state and is administrated by Corpozulia. The people from this region seek autonomy from the central government.

== History ==
The name of the region refers to the Zulia River, which runs through Colombian lands under the name of Batatas and flows into the Catatumbo River, but there is no consensus on the origin of the word Zulia.

The territory of Zulia was sighted in 1499 by an expedition commanded by Alonso de Ojeda. During the Spanish Colony, its lands were part of the Province of Venezuela until 1676, when they were added to the Province of Mérida, later known as the Holy Spirit of Maracaibo. By 1786, this covered the territories of Zulia, Apure, Barinas, Táchira, Mérida and Trujillo.

In the times of Gran Colombia since 1824 it was called the department of Zulia. When the Great Colombian Union disappeared in 1830, Maracaibo became one of the 11 (eleven) Provinces of Venezuela.

In 1881 by disposition of the federal government the state of Falcon-Zulia was formed where it was definitively configured with its status of autonomous state on April 1, 1890, when the Congress decreed the separation of the state of Falcon-Zulia.

== Geography ==
The Zulian Region is located in the extreme northwest and is bordered to the north by the Caribbean Sea, to the east by Falcon, Lara and Trujillo, to the southeast by Mérida, to the south by Tachira and to the west, from the Guajira Peninsula to the mountains of Perijá, with the country of Colombia. With 63,100 km^{2} (24,400 sq mi) it is the fifth largest state and with 6,893,995 inhabitants in 2019, the most populated.

== Gallery ==
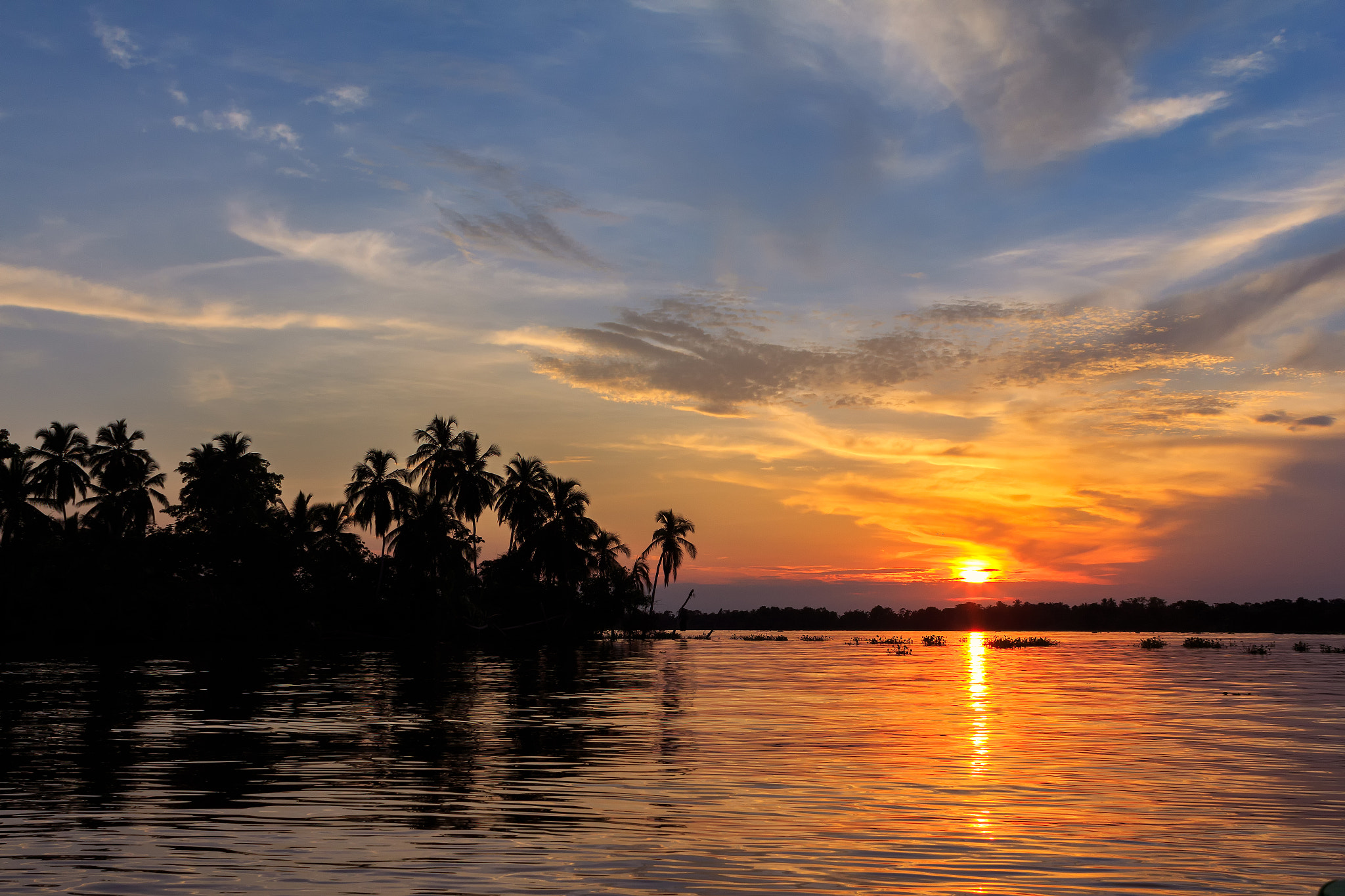
Sunset At Congo Mirador, Zulian Region

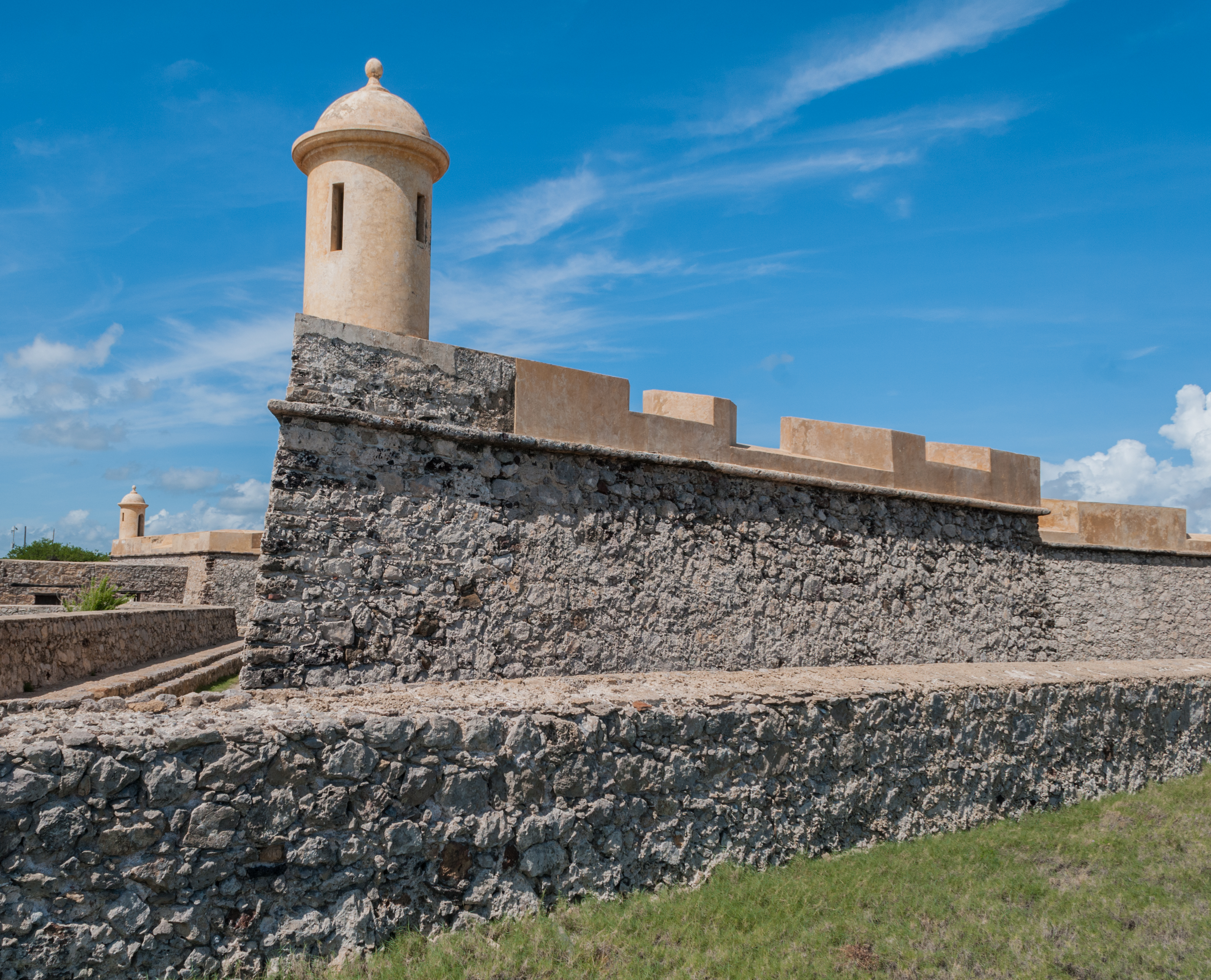
San Carlos de La Barra, Castle

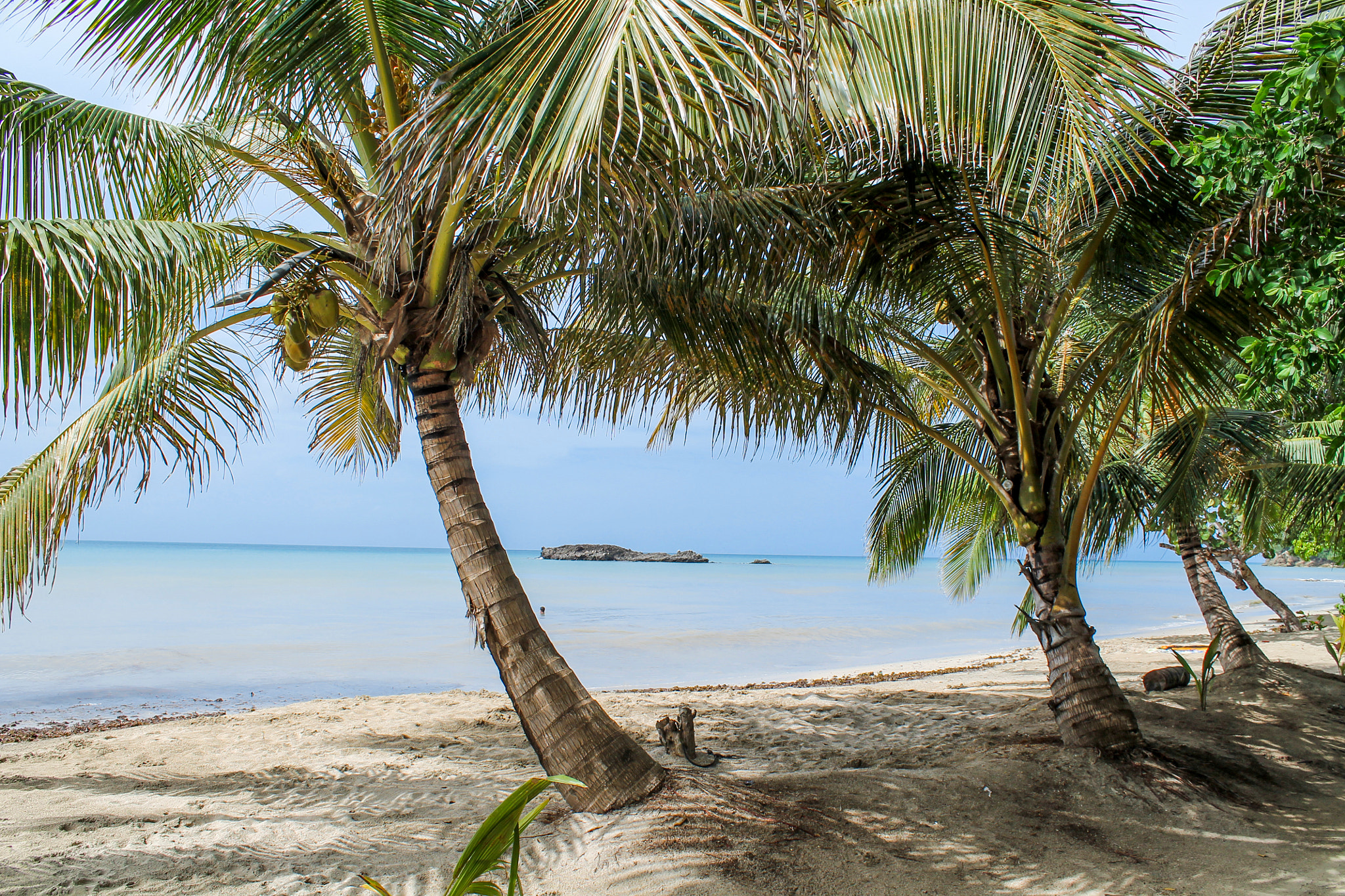
Providencia Island (Lepers Island)

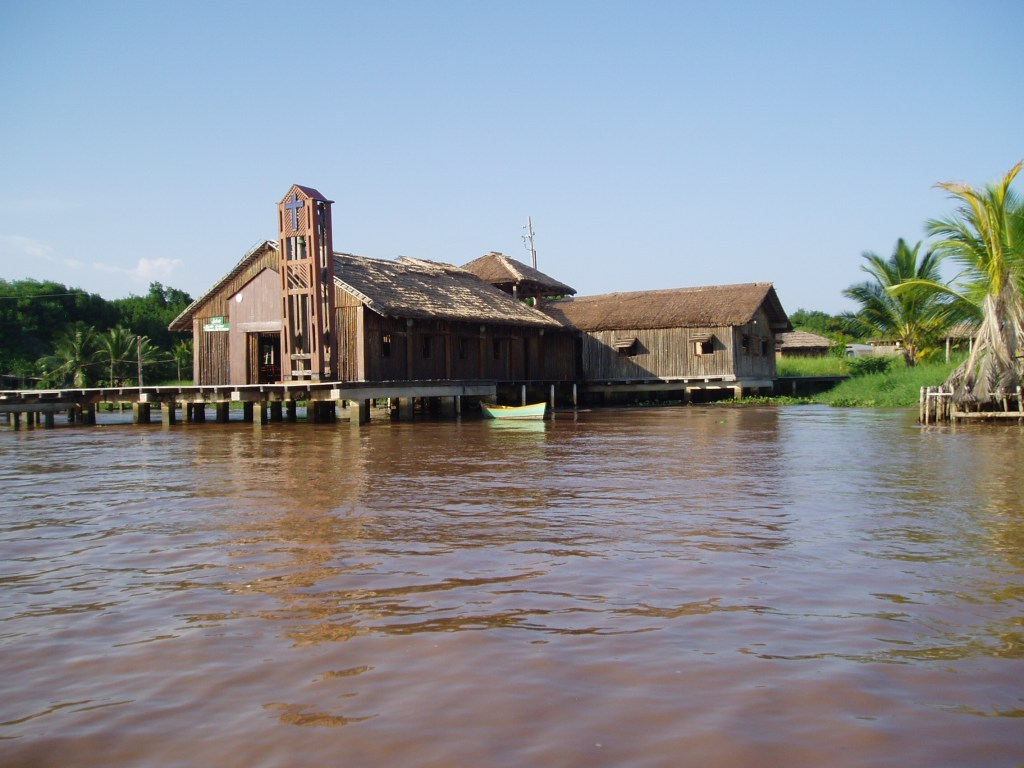
Our Lady of M.C Church, Sinamaica Lagoon, Guajira Municipality

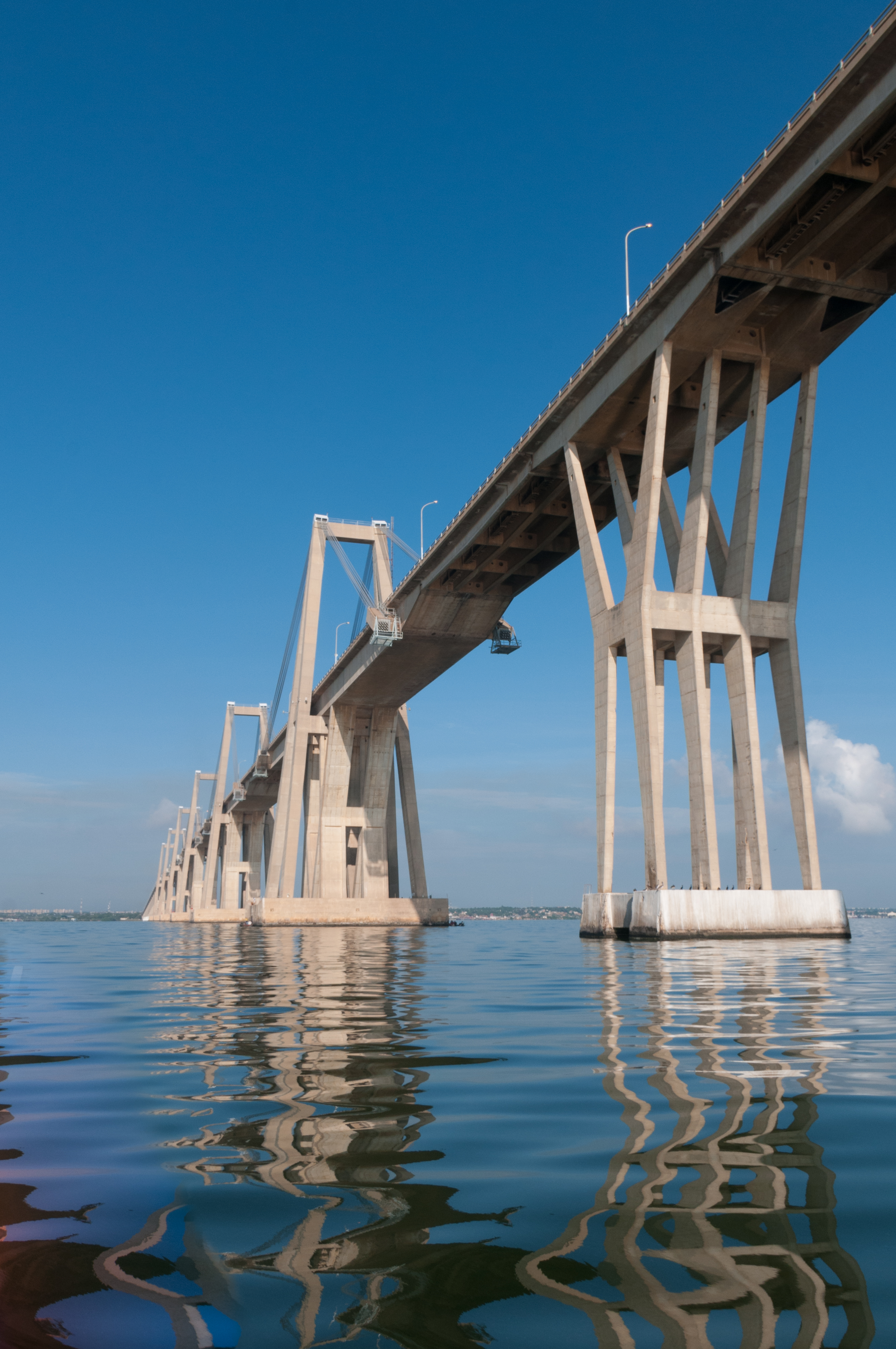
Rafael Urdaneta Bridge
