= Outline of Venezuela =

Country in South America

The Flag of Venezuela

Orthographic projection of Venezuela

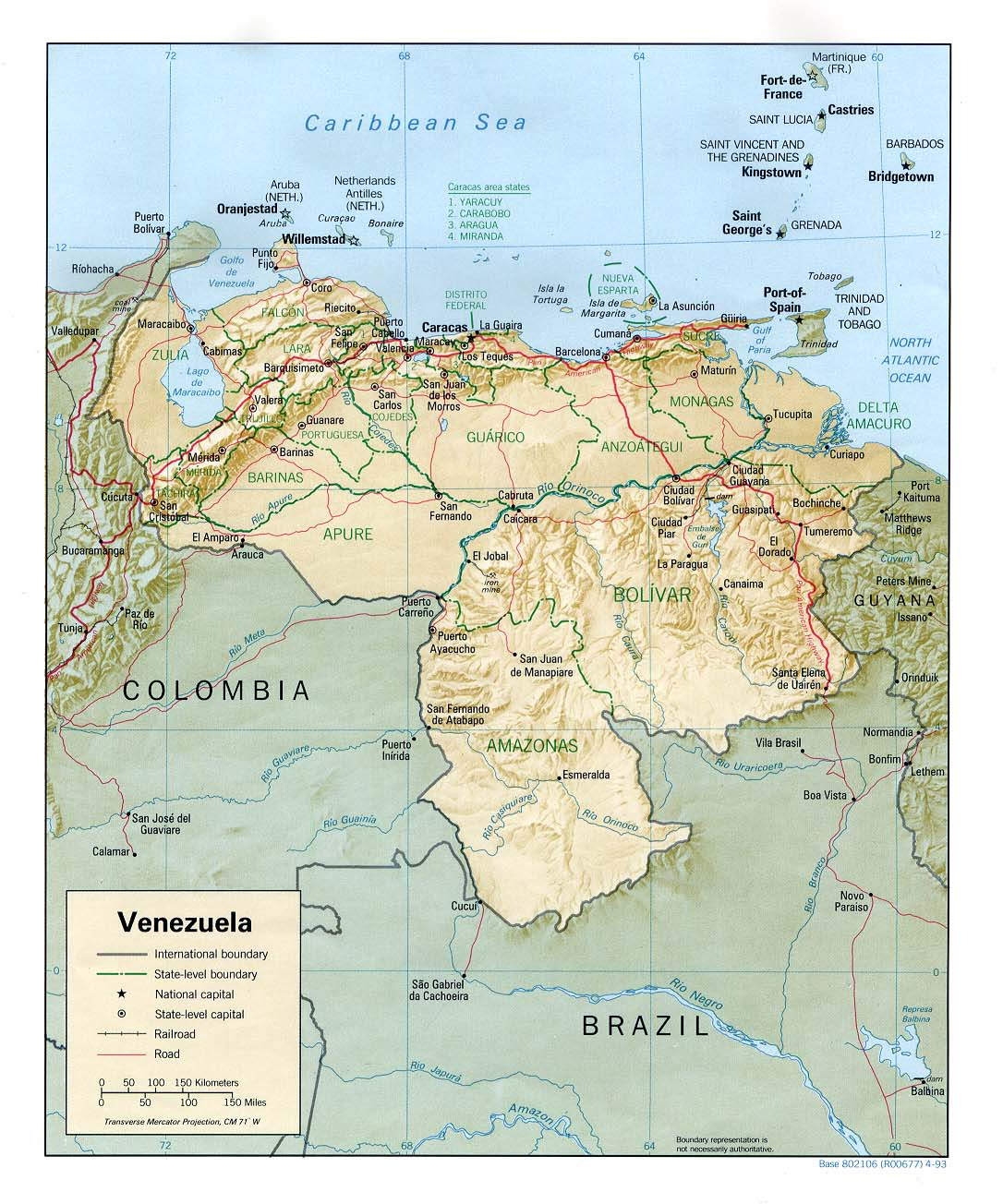
An enlargeable relief map of Venezuela

The following outline is provided as an overview of and topical guide to Venezuela:

Venezuela – sovereign country located in northern South America. It comprises a continental mainland and numerous islands located off the Venezuelan coastline in the Caribbean Sea. The country borders Guyana to the east, Brazil to the south, and Colombia to the west. Trinidad and Tobago, Grenada, St. Lucia, Barbados, Curaçao, Bonaire, Aruba, Saint Vincent and the Grenadines and the Leeward Antilles lie just north, off the Venezuelan coast. Falling within the tropics, Venezuela sits close to the equator, in the Northern Hemisphere. A former Spanish colony, which has been an independent republic since 1821, Venezuela holds territorial disputes with Guyana, largely concerning the Essequibo area, and with Colombia concerning the Gulf of Venezuela. In 1895, after the dispute over the Guyana border flared up, it was submitted to a neutral commission, which in 1899 decided it mostly in Guyana's favour. Today, the Bolivarian Republic of Venezuela is known widely for its petroleum industry, the environmental diversity of its territory, and its natural features. Venezuela is considered to be among the world's 17 most biodiverse countries.

== General reference ==
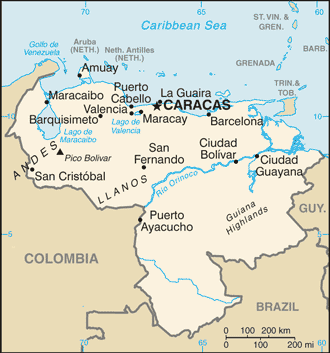
An enlargeable basic map of Venezuela

- Pronunciation:
- Common English country name: Venezuela
- Official English country name: The Bolivarian Republic of Venezuela
- Common endonym(s):
- Official endonym(s):
- Adjectival(s): Venezuela
- Demonym(s): Venezuelan(s)
- Etymology: Name of Venezuela
- International rankings of Venezuela
- ISO country codes: VE, VEN, 862
- ISO region codes: See ISO 3166-2:VE
- Internet country code top-level domain: .ve

== Geography of Venezuela ==
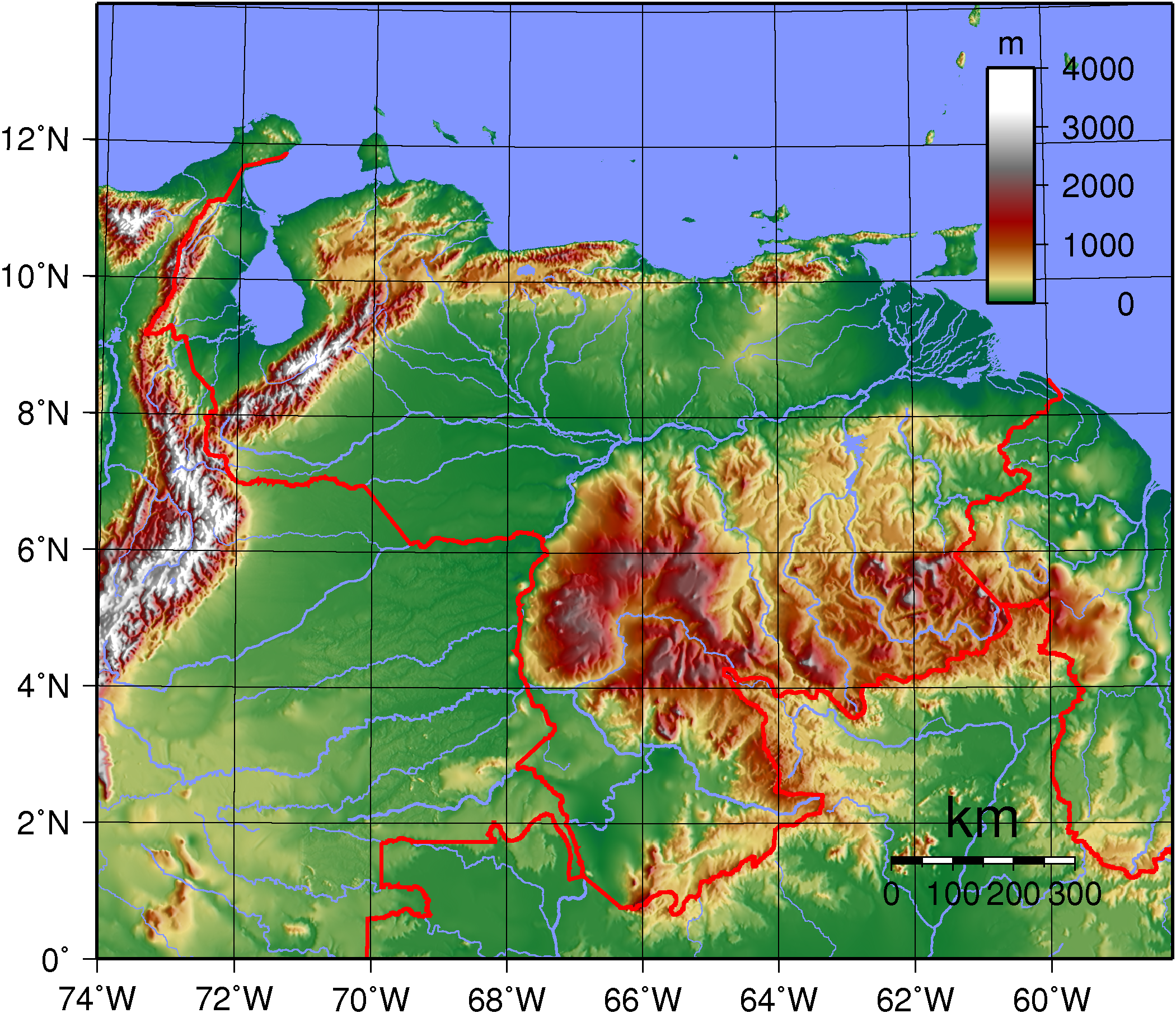
An enlargeable topographic map of Venezuela

- Venezuela is: a megadiverse country
- Location:
  - Northern Hemisphere
  - Western Hemisphere
    - Latin America
      - South America
  - Time zone: Venezuelan Standard Time (UTC-04:30)
  - Extreme points of Venezuela
    - High: Pico Bolívar 4,981 m (16,342 ft)
    - Low: Lagunillas Municipality, Zulia −12 m (−39 ft)
  - Land boundaries: 4,993 km

- Brazil 2,200 km
- Colombia 2,050 km
- Guyana 743 km

- Coastline: 2,800 km

- Population of Venezuela: 28,018,018 (25 September 2008) – 53rd most populous country
- Area of Venezuela: 916,445 km^{2}
- Atlas of Venezuela

=== Environment of Venezuela ===
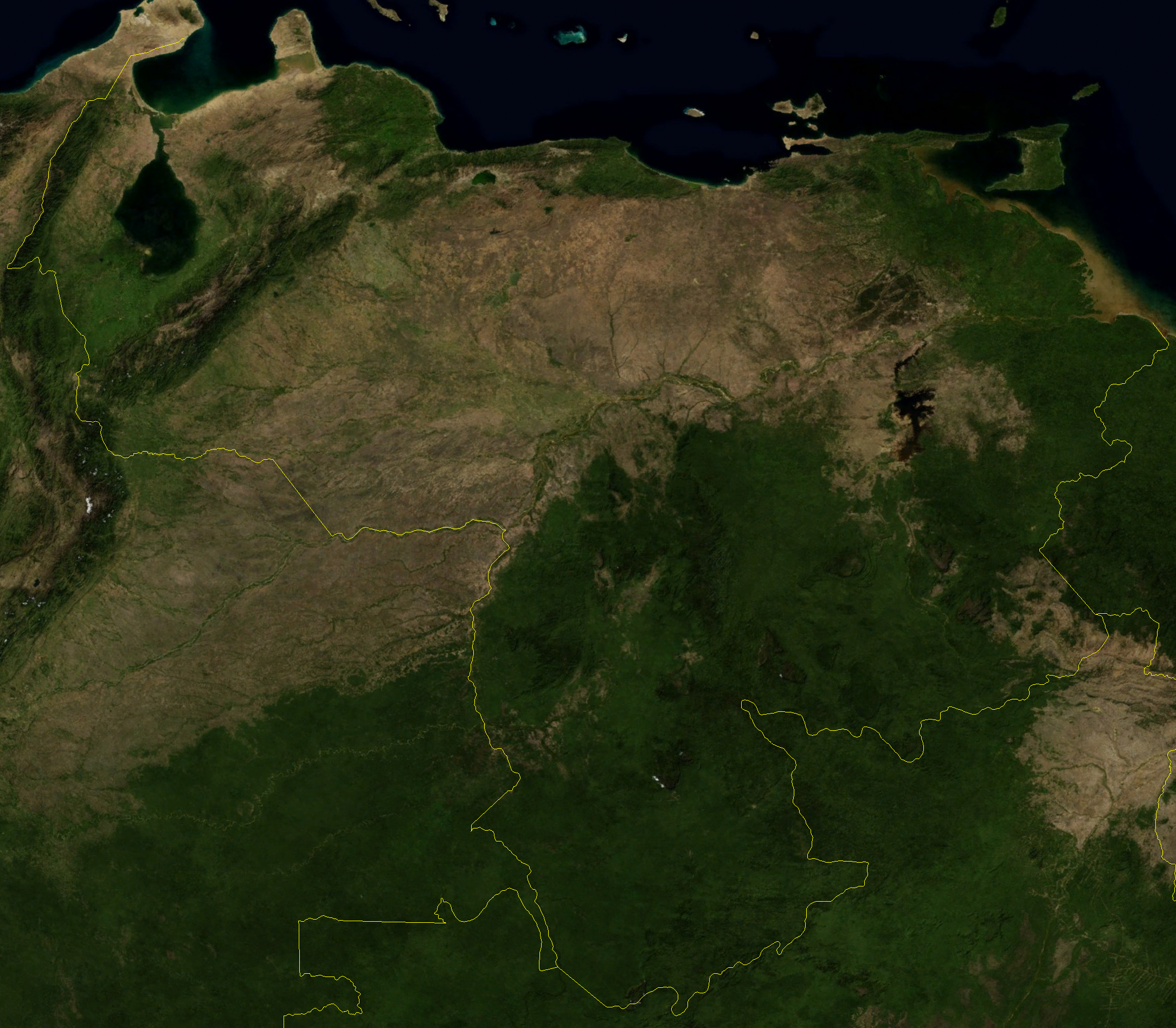
An enlargeable satellite image of Venezuela

Environment of Venezuela

- climate of Venezuela
- Environmental issues in Venezuela
- Protected areas of Venezuela
  - National parks of Venezuela
- Wildlife of Venezuela
  - Flora of Venezuela
  - Fauna of Venezuela
    - Birds of Venezuela
    - Mammals of Venezuela

==== Natural geographic features of Venezuela ====
- Glaciers of Venezuela
- Islands of Venezuela
- Rivers of Venezuela
- World Heritage Sites in Venezuela

=== Regions of Venezuela ===
==== Ecoregions of Venezuela ====
- List of ecoregions in Venezuela

==== Administrative divisions of Venezuela ====
Flag	State	Capital	Largest city	Population (2021)	Population (2011)	Area (km^{2})	Density per km^{2} (2021)	Density per km^{2} (2011)	Region	Map
	Amazonas	Puerto Ayacucho		180,000	146,480	180,145	0.99	0.81	Guayana	
	Anzoátegui	Barcelona		1,570,000	1,469,747	43,300	36.26	33.94	Eastern	
	Apure	San Fernando de Apure		570,000	459,025	76,500	7.45	6.00	Llanos	
	Aragua	Maracay		1,640,000	1,630,308	7,014	233.82	232.44	Central	
	Barinas	Barinas		830,000	816,264	35,200	23.58	23.19	Andean	
	Bolívar	Ciudad Bolívar	Ciudad Guayana	1,730,000	1,410,964	238,000	7.27	5.93	Guayana	
	Carabobo	Valencia		2,240,000	2,245,744	4,650	481.72	482.96	Central	
	Cojedes	San Carlos		330,000	323,165	14,800	22.29	21.84	Central	
	Delta Amacuro	Tucupita		190,000	167,676	40,200	4.72	4.17	Guayana	
	Falcón	Coro	Punto Fijo	990,000	902,847	24,800	39.92	36.41	Central-Western	
	Guárico	San Juan de los Morros	Calabozo	830,000	747,739	64,986	12.77	11.51	Llanos	
	La Guaira	La Guaira		340,000	352,920	1,496	227.27	235.91	Capital	
	Lara	Barquisimeto		1,870,000	1,774,867	19,800	94.44	89.64	Central-Western	
	Mérida	Mérida		880,000	828,592	11,300	77.88	73.33	Andean	
	Miranda	Los Teques		2,970,000	2,675,165	7,950	373.58	336.50	Capital	
	Monagas	Maturín		930,000	905,443	28,930	32.15	31.30	Eastern	
	Nueva Esparta	La Asunción	Porlamar	570,000	491,610	1,150	495.65	427.90	Insular	
	Portuguesa	Guanare	Acarigua	930,000	876,496	15,200	61.18	57.66	Central-Western	
	Sucre	Cumaná		990,000	896,291	11,800	83.90	75.96	Eastern	
	Táchira	San Cristóbal		1,030,000	1,168,908	11,100	92.79	105.31	Andean	
	Trujillo	Trujillo	Valera	770,000	686,367	7,400	104.05	92.75	Andean	
	Yaracuy	San Felipe		670,000	600,852	7,100	94.37	84.63	Central-Western	
	Zulia	Maracaibo		3,830,000	3,704,404	63,100	60.70	58.71	Zulian	
Disputed state whose territory is controlled by Guyana:
	Guayana Esequiba	Tumeremo (administrative center)		128,000	125,000	159,542	0.8	0.78	Guayana	

- States of Venezuela
  - Federal Dependencies of Venezuela
- Municipalities of Venezuela
  - Capital of Venezuela: Caracas
  - Cities of Venezuela

== Government and politics of Venezuela ==
- Form of government: federal republic
  - Capital of Venezuela: Caracas
  - Elections in Venezuela
  - Political parties in Venezuela

=== Branches of the government of Venezuela ===
- Government of Venezuela Venezuela's government has five branches.

==== Executive branch of the government of Venezuela ====
- Head of state and government: President of Venezuela, Nicolás Maduro (Acting President: Delcy Rodríguez)
  - Vice President of Venezuela, Vacant
- Cabinet of Venezuela

==== Legislative branch of the government of Venezuela ====
- National Assembly of Venezuela

==== Judicial branch of the government of Venezuela ====
Court system of Venezuela

- Supreme Tribunal of Justice (Venezuela)

==== Citizen branch of the government of Venezuela ====
- Republican Moral Council (Venezuela)

==== Electoral branch of the government of Venezuela ====
- National Electoral Council (Venezuela)

=== Foreign relations of Venezuela ===
Foreign relations of Venezuela

- Diplomatic missions in Venezuela
- Diplomatic missions of Venezuela

==== International organization membership ====
The Bolivarian Republic of Venezuela is a member of:

- Agency for the Prohibition of Nuclear Weapons in Latin America and the Caribbean (OPANAL)
- Caribbean Community and Common Market (Caricom) (observer)
- Caribbean Development Bank (CDB)
- Food and Agriculture Organization (FAO)
- Group of 15 (G15)
- Group of 24 (G24)
- Group of 77 (G77)
- Inter-American Development Bank (IADB)
- International Atomic Energy Agency (IAEA)
- International Bank for Reconstruction and Development (IBRD)
- International Chamber of Commerce (ICC)
- International Civil Aviation Organization (ICAO)
- International Criminal Court (ICCt)
- International Criminal Police Organization (Interpol)
- International Development Association (IDA)
- International Federation of Red Cross and Red Crescent Societies (IFRCS)
- International Finance Corporation (IFC)
- International Fund for Agricultural Development (IFAD)
- International Hydrographic Organization (IHO)
- International Labour Organization (ILO)
- International Maritime Organization (IMO)
- International Mobile Satellite Organization (IMSO)
- International Monetary Fund (IMF)
- International Olympic Committee (IOC)
- International Organization for Migration (IOM)
- International Organization for Standardization (ISO)
- International Red Cross and Red Crescent Movement (ICRM)
- International Telecommunication Union (ITU)
- International Telecommunications Satellite Organization (ITSO)
- International Trade Union Confederation (ITUC)
- Inter-Parliamentary Union (IPU)
- Latin American Economic System (LAES)
- Latin American Integration Association (LAIA)
- League of Arab States (LAS) (observer)
- Multilateral Investment Guarantee Agency (MIGA)
- Nonaligned Movement (NAM)
- Organisation for the Prohibition of Chemical Weapons (OPCW)
- Organization of American States (OAS)
- Organization of Petroleum Exporting Countries (OPEC)
- Permanent Court of Arbitration (PCA)
- Rio Group (RG)
- Southern Cone Common Market (Mercosur) (associate)
- Unión Latina
- Union of South American Nations (UNASUR)
- United Nations (UN)
- United Nations Conference on Trade and Development (UNCTAD)
- United Nations Educational, Scientific, and Cultural Organization (UNESCO)
- United Nations High Commissioner for Refugees (UNHCR)
- United Nations Industrial Development Organization (UNIDO)
- Universal Postal Union (UPU)
- World Confederation of Labour (WCL)
- World Customs Organization (WCO)
- World Federation of Trade Unions (WFTU)
- World Health Organization (WHO)
- World Intellectual Property Organization (WIPO)
- World Meteorological Organization (WMO)
- World Tourism Organization (UNWTO)
- World Trade Organization (WTO)

=== Law and order in Venezuela ===
Law of Venezuela

- Capital punishment in Venezuela
- Constitution of Venezuela
- Crime in Venezuela
- Human rights in Venezuela
  - LGBT rights in Venezuela
- Law enforcement in Venezuela

=== Military of Venezuela ===
- Military of Venezuela
  - Command
    - Commander-in-chief: President of Venezuela
      - Ministry of Defence of Venezuela
  - Forces
    - Army of Venezuela
    - Navy of Venezuela
    - Air Force of Venezuela
  - Military ranks of Venezuela

=== Local government in Venezuela ===
- Local government in Venezuela

== History of Venezuela ==
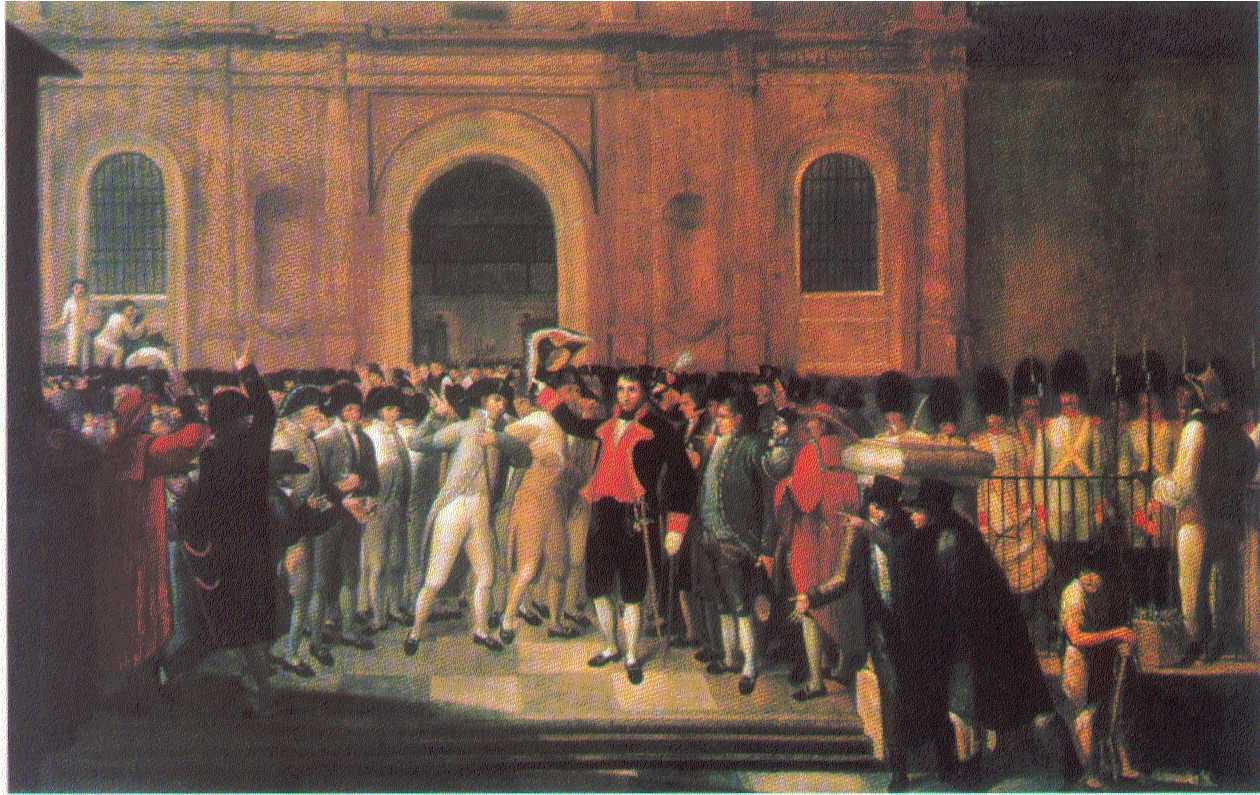
19 April 1810. Painting by Juan Lovera (1835)

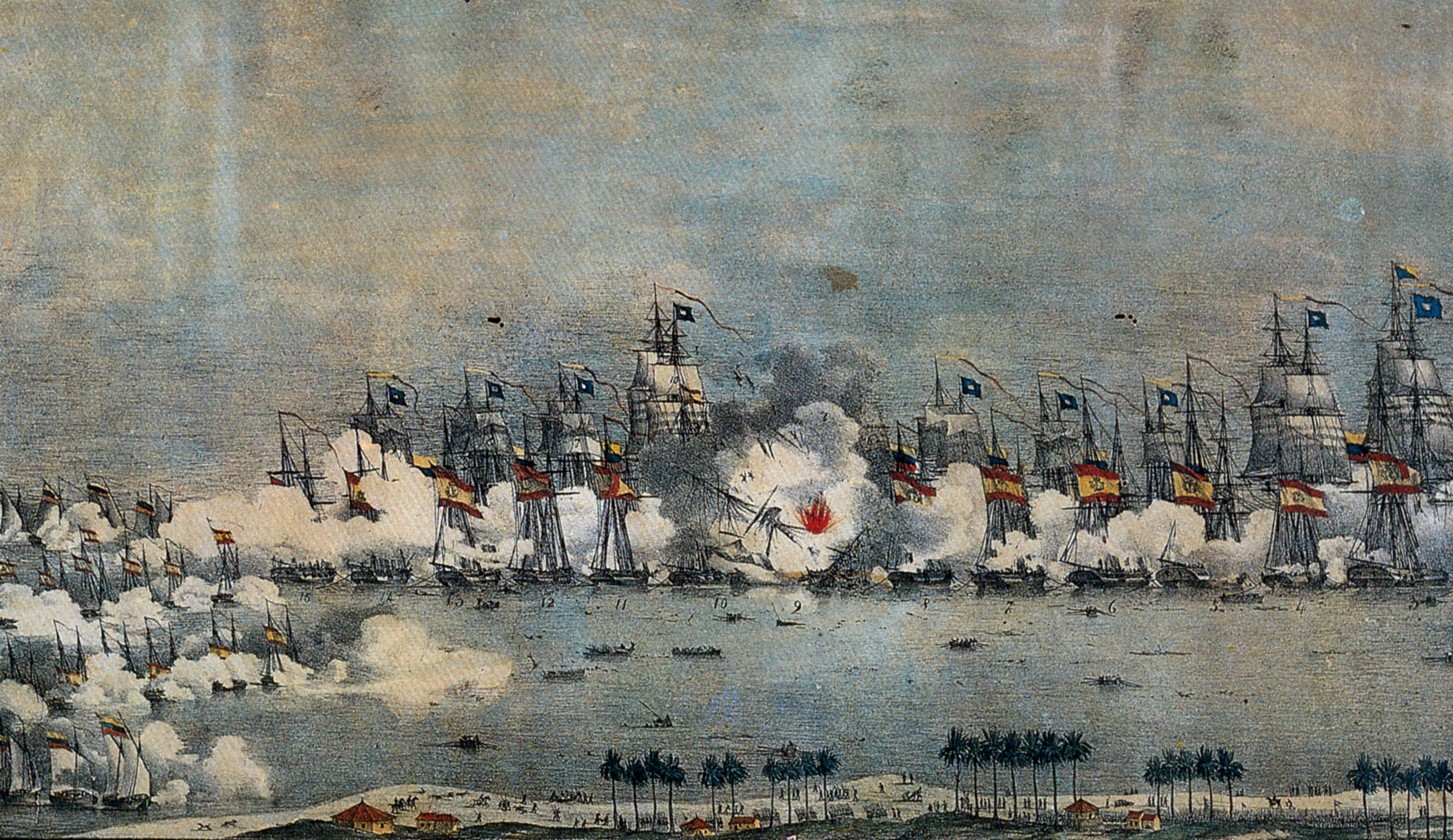
Battle of Lake Maracaibo in 1823 resulted in the final expulsion of the Spanish from Gran Colombia

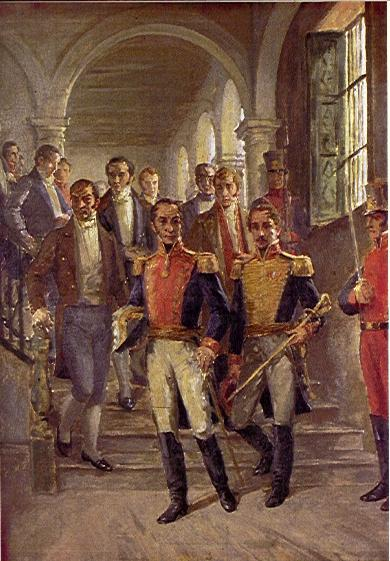
Simón Bolívar and Francisco Santander at the Congress of Cúcuta. Painting by Ricardo Acevedo Bernal

=== History of Venezuela, by period ===
- List of years in Venezuela
- Pre-Columbian period in Venezuela (Prehistory–1522)
- Colonial Venezuela (1522–1821)
  - Viceroyalty of New Granada
  - Captaincy General of Venezuela
  - First Republic of Venezuela (5 July 1811 to 25 July 1812)
  - Second Republic of Venezuela
  - Venezuelan War of Independence
  - Third Republic of Venezuela (1817–19)
- Gran Colombia (1821–30)
  - Venezuela Department (1820)
  - Venezuela Department (1824)
- Republic of Venezuela (1830–1999)
  - History of Venezuela (1830–1908)
    - Federal War (1859–63)
    - Venezuelan crisis of 1895
    - Venezuelan crisis of 1902–03
  - History of Venezuela (1908–58)
    - World War II
    - El Trienio Adeco (1945–48)
    - History of Venezuela (1948–58)
  - History of Venezuela (1958–99)
    - 1958 Venezuelan coup d'état
    - Puntofijo Pact (1958)
    - El Carupanazo (1962)
    - El Porteñazo (1962)
    - Caracazo (1989)
    - 1992 Venezuelan coup d'état attempts
- Bolivarian Republic of Venezuela (1999–present)
  - Bolivarian Revolution
  - Vargas tragedy (1999)
  - 2002 Venezuelan coup d'état attempt
  - Venezuelan general strike of 2002–03
  - 2004 Venezuelan recall referendum
  - Crisis in Bolivarian Venezuela
    - 2014–17 Venezuelan protests
    - 2017 Venezuelan constitutional crisis
    - Venezuelan presidential crisis

=== History of Venezuela, by region ===
- Timeline of Caracas

=== History of Venezuela, by subject ===
- History of the Venezuelan oil industry
- Economic history of Venezuela

== Culture of Venezuela ==
- Cuisine of Venezuela
- Languages of Venezuela
- Media in Venezuela
- National symbols of Venezuela
  - Coat of arms of Venezuela
  - Flag of Venezuela
  - National anthem of Venezuela
- People of Venezuela
- Prostitution in Venezuela
- Public holidays in Venezuela
- Religion in Venezuela
  - Buddhism in Venezuela
  - Christianity in Venezuela
  - Hinduism in Venezuela
  - Islam in Venezuela
  - Judaism in Venezuela
- World Heritage Sites in Venezuela

=== Art in Venezuela ===
- Cinema of Venezuela
- Literature of Venezuela
- Music of Venezuela
- Television in Venezuela

=== Sports in Venezuela ===
- Football in Venezuela
- Venezuela at the Olympics

== Economy and infrastructure of Venezuela ==
- Economic rank, by nominal GDP (2007): 35th (thirty-fifth)
- Agriculture in Venezuela
- Communications in Venezuela
  - Internet in Venezuela
    - Latin America and Caribbean Network Information Centre
- Companies of Venezuela
- Currency of Venezuela: Bolívar Fuerte
  - ISO 4217: VEF
- Energy in Venezuela
  - Energy policy of Venezuela
- Health care in Venezuela
- Mining in Venezuela
- Tourism in Venezuela
- Transport in Venezuela
  - Airports in Venezuela
  - Rail transport in Venezuela
- Water supply and sanitation in Venezuela
- Hyperinflation in Venezuela

== See also ==
- Venezuela
  - List of Venezuela-related topics
  - List of international rankings
  - Member state of the United Nations
  - Outline of geography
  - Outline of South America
