= List of flags of Venezuela =

The following is a list of flag of Venezuela. For more information about the national flag, see Flag of Venezuela.

== National flags ==
Flag	Date	Use	Description
	2006–present	State and war flag, state and naval ensign	Horizontal tricolor of yellow, blue, and red with the coat of arms on the hoist side of the yellow band and an arc of eight white five-pointed stars centered in the blue band. Ratio 2:3.
	2006–present	National flag and civil ensign	Horizontal tricolor of yellow, blue, and red with an arc of eight white five-pointed stars, symbolizing the eight provinces that supported independence, centered in the blue band. Ratio 2:3.

=== Historical flags ===
Flag	Date	Use	Description
	1506–1717 (211 years)	Cross of Burgundy, military flag of Spain used as banner of its overseas territories.	Cross of Burgundy on a white field.
	1717–1785 (68 years)	Military banner of Spain used by the Viceroyalty of New Granada.	Coat of arms of Spain on a white field.
	1785–1819 (34 years)	War flag of Spain, used by the Captaincy General of Venezuela	Spanish fess of red, gold, and red with the lesser arms of Spain towards the hoist-side of the flag.
	1806	Flag hoisted by General Francisco de Miranda on the coast of Vela de Coro aboard the ship Leander in 1806	Horizontal tricolor of yellow, blue, and red
	1811–1811 (11 months, 11 days)	Flag of the First Venezuelan Republic	Horizontal tricolor of yellow, blue, and red in which the yellow band takes half of the flag; with a canton on the hoist side showing an indigenous woman, an Orinoco crocodile and the Caribbean Sea.
	1813–1814 (1 year, 1 month)	Flag of the Second Venezuelan Republic. Commonly known as the "Bandera de Guerra a Muerte" ("flag of the War to the Death")	Red field with a white rhombus encasing a black rectangle.
	1817 (6 months, 8 days)	Flag of the Third Venezuelan Republic	Horizontal tricolor of yellow, blue, and red with seven blue stars on the yellow band.
	1817–1819 (1 year, 11 months, 27 days)	Flag of the Third Venezuelan Republic	Horizontal tricolor of yellow, blue, and red with eight blue stars on the yellow band.
	1819–1820 (24 days)	First flag of Gran Colombia	Horizontal tricolor of yellow, blue, and red in which the yellow band takes half of the flag, with the coat of arms of the Republic of Colombia on the hoist side of the yellow band.
	1820–1821 (1 year, 8 months, 27 days)	Second flag of Gran Colombia	Horizontal tricolor of yellow, blue, and red in which the yellow band takes half of the flag, with the coat of arms of the Republic of Colombia on the hoist side of the yellow band.
	1821–1830 (9 years, 8 days)	Third flag of Gran Colombia	Horizontal tricolor of yellow, blue, and red, with the coat of arms of the Republic of Colombia in the center.
	1830–1836 (5 years, 6 months, 6 days)	Provisional flag of the State of Venezuela	Horizontal tricolor of yellow, blue, and red, with the coat of arms of the State of Venezuela in the center.
	1836–1859 (27 years, 3 months 9 days)	Flag of the State of Venezuela	Horizontal tricolor of yellow, blue, and red, with the coat of arms of the State of Venezuela on the hoist side of the yellow band.
	1859 (3 months, 20 days)	First flag of the Federation	Horizontal tricolor of yellow, blue, and red, with seven blue stars on the yellow band.
	1859–1863 (4 years, 1 month, 14 days)	Second flag of the Federation	Horizontal tricolor of yellow, blue, and red, with twenty blue stars on the yellow band.
	1863–1905 (41 years, 7 months, 30 days)	Flag of the United States of Venezuela	Horizontal tricolor of yellow, blue, and red, with seven white stars arranged in a hexagon in the center of the blue band. The state flag included the country's coat of arms on the hoist side of the yellow band.
	1863–1905 (41 years, 7 months, 30 days)	State flag of the United States of Venezuela	Horizontal tricolor of yellow, blue, and red, with seven white stars arranged in a hexagon in the center of the blue band. The state flag included the country's coat of arms on the hoist side of the yellow band.
	1905–1930 (25 years, 3 months, 18 days)	Flag of the United States of Venezuela under Juan Vicente Gómez	Horizontal tricolor of yellow, blue, and red, with a circle of seven white stars in the center of the blue band. The state flag included the country's coat of arms on the hoist side of the yellow band.
	1905–1930 (25 years, 3 months, 18 days)	State flag of the United States of Venezuela under Juan Vicente Gómez	Horizontal tricolor of yellow, blue, and red, with a circle of seven white stars in the center of the blue band. The state flag included the country's coat of arms on the hoist side of the yellow band.
	1930–2006 (Note: Applied until 2006 as the civil flag) (23 years, 7 months, 2 days)	Flag of the Republic of Venezuela	Horizontal tricolor of yellow, blue, and red, with an arc of seven white stars in the center of the blue band. The state flag included the country's coat of arms on the hoist side of the yellow band. The iteration of the state flag that was officially used from 1954 to 2006 is still in use by some Venezuelan diaspora in opposition to the current government.
	1930–1954 (23 years, 7 months, 2 days)	State flag of the Republic of Venezuela	Horizontal tricolor of yellow, blue, and red, with an arc of seven white stars in the center of the blue band. The state flag included the country's coat of arms on the hoist side of the yellow band. The iteration of the state flag that was officially used from 1954 to 2006 is still in use by some Venezuelan diaspora in opposition to the current government.
	1954–2006 (Note: Only applied to the state flag) (51 years, 18 days); 2006–present (Note: The flag is used by some opposition parties.)	Flag of the Republic of Venezuela (1954–1999); Flag of the Bolivarian Republic of Venezuela (1999–2006)	Horizontal tricolor of yellow, blue, and red, with an arc of seven white stars in the center of the blue band. The state flag included the country's coat of arms on the hoist side of the yellow band. The iteration of the state flag that was officially used from 1954 to 2006 is still in use by some Venezuelan diaspora in opposition to the current government.

== Governmental flags ==
Flag	Date	Use	Description
	1970–1997	Presidential standard	Square red field with the coat of arms in the center.
	1997–2006	Presidential standard	Square yellow field with the coat of arms in the center.
	2006–present	Presidential standard	Square yellow field with the coat of arms in the center.
	2006–present	Presidential standard (at sea)	Blue field with the coat of arms in the center and four white stars in each corner. Ratio 2:3.

== Military flags ==
Flag	Date	Use	Description
	2014–present	Supreme Commander's Honorary Colour	Used in all military ceremonies
	2007–present	Defense ministry flag	
	1951–2007	Defense ministry flag	
	1999–present	Army flag	A blue field with a red diagonal band with the coat of arms of the Army from the upper hoist side to the lower fly side.
	1999–present	Navy flag	
	1930–present	Naval jack	Blue field with a white anchor under an arc of seven white stars. Ratio 2:3.
	1995–present	Air force flag	
	2007–present	National guard flag	
	2011–present	Militia branch flag	
	2005–present	Strategic command flag	

== Administrative divisions flags ==
Flag	Date	Use	Description
	2002–present	Amazonas	Horizontal tricolor of blue, green, and red with a brown outline of the state (bordered in yellow) in the center. The map is charged with seven stars spread unevenly inside the map, showing the location of the state's seven municipalities, alongside an outline of Cerro Autana and a Yanomami's face. Ratio 2:3.
	1999–present	Anzoátegui	Main article: Flag of Anzoátegui Horizontal tricolor of light blue, yellow, and green with a black border outlining the state in the center and the state's coat of arms on the hoist side of the blue band. Ratio 2:3.
	1996–present	Apure	Horizontal triband of yellow, blue, and green; with a white triangle based at the hoist side charged with the state's coat of arms and seven white stars on the blue band. Ratio 2:3.
	1930–present	Aragua	Bicolor diagonal quartered of red and yellow with the state's coat of arms in the center. Ratio 2:3.
	1958–present	Barinas	Horizontal tricolor of light blue, white, and green, with a red square in the center of the white band, charged with a yellow rising sun, a road of the same color and a green palm tree. Ratio 2:3.
	1930–present	Bolívar	Main article: Flag of Bolívar State Yellow field with a green circle in the center, superposed by three horizontal blue stripes. The state's coat of arms is on the upper hoist side of the yellow field and the central blue stripe is charged with eight white stars. Ratio 110:168.
	2022–present	Capital District (Caracas)	Three triangles of red, blue, and red, with a white star in the center. The base of the blue triangle contains in green the shape of Waraira Repano (Cerro El Ávila). Ratio 2:3.
	1995–present	Carabobo	Horizontal triband of red, blue, and red again, in which the upper red band takes three fifths of the flag. The red band is charged with a yellow sun based on the fly side of the blue band. The sun is charged with the Arch of Carabobo. The upper side of the blue band is bordered by a green line. Ratio 2:3.
	1997–present	Cojedes	Horizontal triband of orange, black, and blue in which the orange band takes two thirds of the flag; with a blue circle charged with a yellow sun on the hoist side of the orange band. Ratio 2:3.
	2002–present	Delta Amacuro	Horizontal triband of light blue, green, and blue; with a white, yellow, brown, and black-edged blue triangle based on the hoist, charged with a green outline of the state. The proportion of the bands is 3:2:3; and the sky blue band is charged with an arc of four white stars. Ratio 2:3.
	2006–present	Falcón	Blue field with a yellow rising sun on the upper hoist side and a white moon on the lower fly side; charged with a red chief bearing the words "Muera la Tiranía Viva la Libertad" ("Death to Tyranny and long live Freedom"). Based on Francisco de Miranda's naval flag. Ratio 2:3.
	Unknown. First spotted in 1938	Federal Dependencies (Probably unofficial)	Horizontal tricolor of green, white, and blue, with a red fish in the center of the white band. Ratio 2:3.
	1995–present	Guárico	Four horizontal bands of blue, white, yellow, and green, with the state's coat of arms on the hoist side of the blue band; charged with a half-blue, half-green outline of the map bearing a cow's head sided by an ear of rice and an ear of sorghum, and an image of the Morros de San Juan. The map is surrounded by fourteen golden stars (seven on each side). Ratio 2:3.
	2000–present	Lara	Two horizontal bands of red and green, the red twice the size of the green. The red band is charged with a setting sun with thirteen yellow-edged white rays based on the green band. Ratio 2:3.
	1996–present	Mérida	Three triangles of green, white, and light blue, with a red star in the center. The white central triangle is based on the bottom of the flag, dividing the green and light blue triangles. Ratio 2:3.
	2006–present	Miranda	Horizontal tricolor of black, red, and yellow, with an arc of six white stars in the center of the red band and a yellow sun on the hoist side of the black band, charged with two cocoa branches and the words "Libertad o Muerte" ("Liberty or Death"). Based on Francisco de Miranda's military flag. Ratio 2:3.
	2002–present	Monagas	Light blue field superposed by three horizontal bands of blue, green, and black, with a yellow sun based on the middle of the green band. The light blue field is charged with a stylized black outline of Juana Ramírez under an arc of thirteen white stars. Ratio 2:3.
	1998–present	Nueva Esparta	Horizontal tricolor of yellow, green, and blue, in which the yellow band takes half of the flag; the green band is charged with three white stars and the yellow band is charged with a white semi-circle based on the fly side of the green band. Ratio 2:3.
	1952–present	Portuguesa	Two horizontal bands of blue and green separated by a narrow white stripe; the blue band is larger than the green and has a white-edged sun on its upper hoist side. Ratio 2:3.
	2002–present	Sucre	Diagonal bisection of white and sky blue, with the state's coat of arms on the upper hoist side and fifteen white stars on the lower fly side. Ratio 2:3.
	1997–present	Táchira	Horizontal tricolor of yellow, black, and red, with two coffee branches under an arc of four white stars. Ratio 2:3.
	1994–present	Trujillo	Two horizontal bands of red and white with a green triangle based on the hoist, charged with a white star bearing a pigeon. Ratio 2:3.
	1999–present	La Guaira (formerly known as Vargas)	Two horizontal bands of white and blue with proportions of 3:1 on the hoist side; the white field charged with a red-edged yellow sun and the blue with four white stars. To the fly side, four vertical bands of yellow, red, white, and blue. Based on the flag of José María España and Manuel Gual. Ratio 2:3.
	1995–present	Yaracuy	A white diagonal band radiating from the lower hoist-side corner. The upper triangle is red, and the lower triangle is blue. On the center of the flag, a yellow sun with a circle showing a green field with brown mountains in the horizon, and a light blue sky with three white clouds. Ratio 2:3.
	1991–present	Zulia	Two horizontal bands of blue and black, with a yellow sun in the center charged with a white thunder bolt. Ratio 2:3.

=== Historical state flags ===
Flag	Date	Use	Description
	1989–2022	Capital District (Caracas)	Red field with the former coat of arms of Caracas in the center. Ratio 2:3.
	2006–2008	Carabobo	Horizontal triband of wine, light blue, and wine again. The upper wine band is charged with an orange sun with yellow rays based on the fly side of the light blue band. The sun is charged with the Arch of Carabobo. The upper side of the light blue band is bordered by a light green line. Ratio 2:3.
	1970–2006	Falcón	Horizontal tricolor of green, yellow, and blue with the state's former coat of arms in the center. Ratio 2:3.
	1970–2006	Miranda	Two horizontal bands of blue and green, with a yellow rising sun charged with two cocoa branches in the center. Ratio 2:3.
	1965–2002	Sucre	Diagonal bisection of white and sky blue, with the state's coat of arms on the upper hoist side and eleven white stars arranged into two downward-facing triangles on the lower fly side. Ratio 2:3.

== Political flags ==
Flag	Date	Use	Description
	2007–present	Flag of the United Socialist Party of Venezuela	A red field charged with the party logo.
	?–present	Flag of Democratic Action	
	?–present	Flag of Tupamaro	
	1840–1899	Flag of the Great Liberal Party of Venezuela	A yellow banner.
	1960–1988	Flag of the Revolutionary Left Movement	
	?–2002	Flag of Falange Venezolana	A black field charged with a red arrow cross.
	2002–?	Flag of Falange Venezolana	A black field charged with a red yoke and arrows.

== See also ==
- List of anthems of Venezuela
- Symbols of Venezuela
