= International rankings of Venezuela =

These are the international rankings of Venezuela.

== Corruption ==
- Venezuela was ranked the 2nd most corrupt country in the world according to the Corruption Perceptions Index.

== Crime ==
- List of countries by homicide rate ranked 2nd highest homicide rate in the world.

== Economy ==
- World Bank List of countries by GDP (nominal) ranked 30th biggest economy in the world (this citation should be reviewed, Venezuela has a blank entry in cited document, nor is the document from 2015).

== Health ==
- List of countries by life expectancy ranked 84th longest life expectancy in the world.

== Human development ==
- List of countries by Human Development Index 2014, ranked 71st highest Human Development in the world

== Technology ==
World Intellectual Property Organization: Venezuela was ranked 127th in the 2026 Global Innovation Index out of 139 countries.

== See also ==
- Outline of Venezuela
