= National symbols of Venezuela =

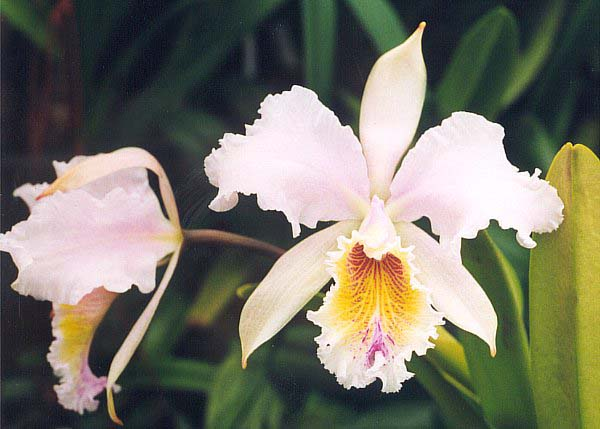
Flor de Mayo (Cattleya mossiae), the Venezuelan national flower

The national symbols of Venezuela are the flag, the coat of arms, and the national anthem. Since Venezuela's diversity of flora and fauna is remarkable, the government also officially declared these national symbols:

- The national flower is the orchid Cattleya mossiae, known as flor de Mayo ("May flower"). It was first discovered in the northern land in 1849 and was given the status of national flower on 23 May 1951.
- The national tree is the araguaney (Tabebuia chrysantha). Called aravanei by the Caribes, it can be found mostly in regions with temperate weather. It can reach a height between 6 and 12 m. The araguaney flourishes within the period following a rainy season, mostly in the first months of the year. Rómulo Gallegos referred to these months as "La primavera de oro de los araguaneyes" ("the golden spring of the araguaneyes"). It was declared the national tree on 29 May 1945.

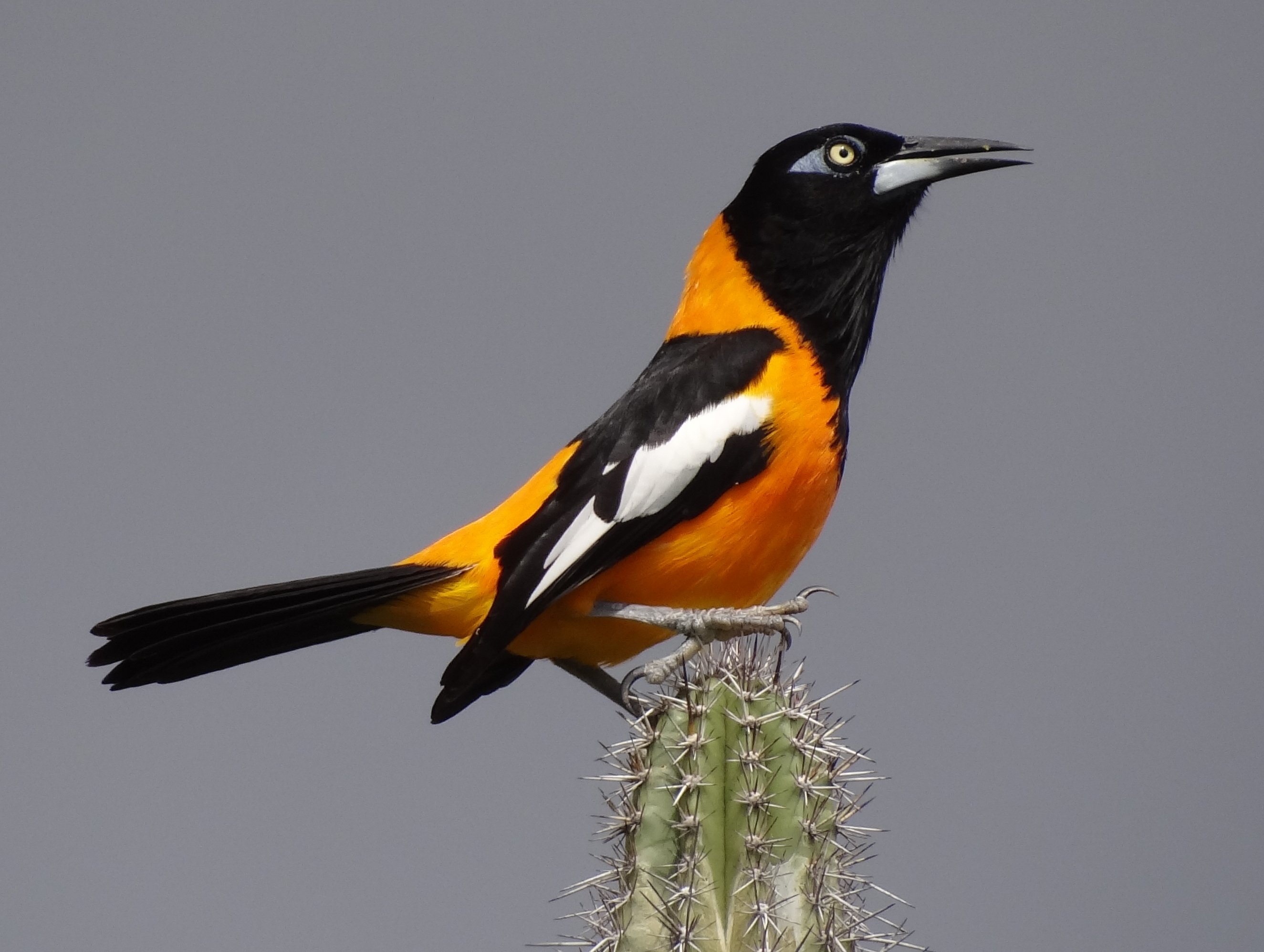
The Venezuelan troupial

- The national bird is the Venezuelan troupial (Icterus icterus). It is fully yellow-orange except on the head and the wings, which are black and white; a blue spot surrounds the eyes. It can be found in woods, the Llanos, the shores of jungles, and northern and southern Orinoco.
