= Religion in Venezuela =

Religion in Venezuela (2024)
1. Catholicism (72%)
2. Protestantism (8%)
3. No religion (14%)
4. Others (6%)
Religion in Venezuela (CIA World Factbook 2023)
1. Catholicism (48.1%)
2. Protestantism (31.6%)
3. Jehovah's Witnesses (1.40%)
4. No religion (14.1%)
5. African religions (0.70%)
6. Other religions (3.60%)
7. Unspecified (0.60%)

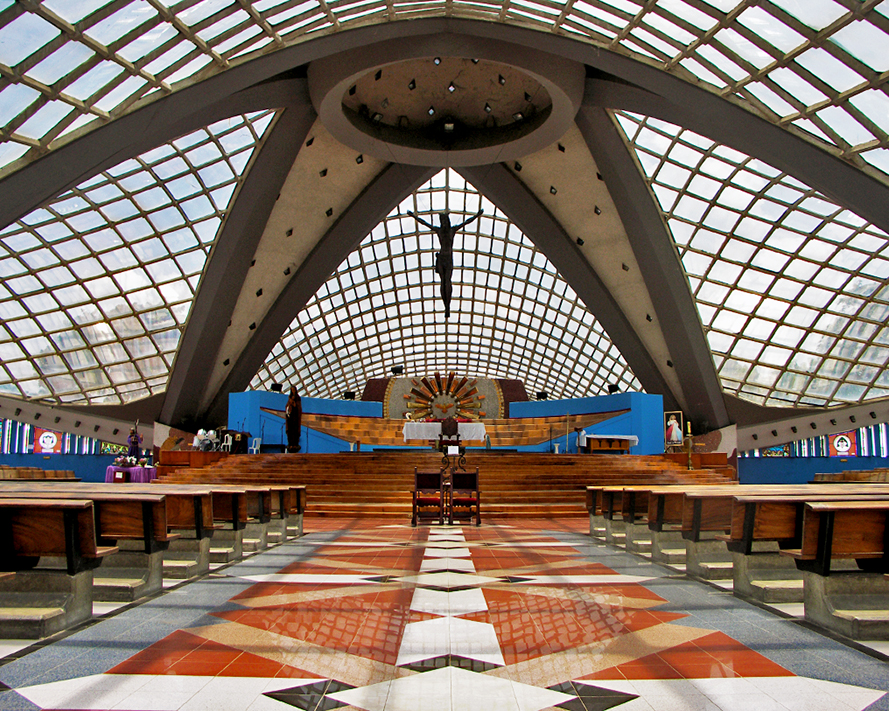
Interior of the Barquisimeto Metropolitan Cathedral

Christianity is the largest religion in Venezuela, with Catholicism having the most adherents.

Venezuela is a secular nation and its constitution guarantees freedom of religion. Before the arrival of Spanish missionaries, the people residing in the territory of modern-day Venezuela practiced a variety of faiths.

== Overview ==
The influence of the Catholic Church was introduced in its colonization by Spain. According to a 2011 poll (GIS XXI), 88% of the population is Christian, primarily Roman Catholic (71%), and the remaining 17% Protestant, primarily Evangelicals (in Latin America Protestants are usually called Evangélicos). The Venezuelans without religion are 8% (atheist 2% and agnostic or indifferent 6%), almost 3% of the population follow other religion (1% of them are of santeria).

There are small but influential Muslim, Druze, Buddhist, and Jewish communities. The Muslim community of about 95,000 is concentrated among persons of Lebanese and Syrian descent living in Nueva Esparta State, Punto Fijo and the Caracas area; Venezuela is home of the largest Druze communities outside the Middle East, and has a significant Druze community (60,000) from the same countries (a former vice president is Druze, showing the small group's influence). Buddhism in Venezuela is practiced by over 52,000 people. The Buddhist community is made up mainly of Chinese, Japanese, and Koreans. There are Buddhist centers in Caracas, Maracay, Mérida, Puerto Ordáz, San Felipe, and Valencia. The Jewish community numbers approximately 13,000 and is mainly concentrated in Caracas.

The Church of Jesus Christ of Latter-day Saints (Mormons) claims 173,125 members (April 2022) mostly in and around Caracas.

Jehovah's Witnesses claim 136,542 active publishers, united in 1,734 congregations; 319,962 people attended annual celebration of Lord's Evening Meal in 2020.

Venezuela is also notable for its significant syncretic religious traditions, most notably those revolving around the figures of Maria Lionza and Jose Gregorio Hernandez.

In Venezuela, a population of Santeria followers has been growing since 2008. Rituals in Santeria include the slaughtering of a rooster, a chicken, or a goat.

Detailed religious affiliation in Venezuela. (2011, GIS XXI)
Affiliation	% of Venezuela population
Christian	88
Catholic	71
Protestant and other Christians	17
Other faiths	3
Santería	1
Atheist	2
Agnostic/indifferent	6
Don't know/refused answer	1
Total	100

== Religious freedom ==
The constitution of Venezuela provides for the freedom of religion insofar as it does not violate "public morality or decency". A 2017 constitutional law criminalizes "incitement to hatred" or violence, including provisions specifically concerning the incitement of hatred against religious groups.

Religious organizations must register with the government in order to obtain legal status. The Directorate of Justice and Religion, part of the Ministry of Interior, Justice and Peace, manages registrations, disburses funds to registered organizations, and promotes religious tolerance. Chaplain services in the military are available only for Catholics.

Religious education is allowed in public schools, although it is not part of any official curriculum proposed by the government. In the past, representatives of the Catholic Church-affiliated National Laity Council have claimed that the government has at times pressured school administrators to not teach religious courses, but that in other cases teachers had autonomy to include religious education as long as their curricula were otherwise compliant with the Ministry of Education's standards.

Leaders of religious organizations who are vocal critics of the government faced verbal harassment by regime leaders. Jewish community leaders have accused state-funded media and some government officials of engaging in antisemitic rhetoric.

In 2023, Freedom House scored the country 3 out of 4 for religious freedom.

== Christianity ==
=== Catholicism ===
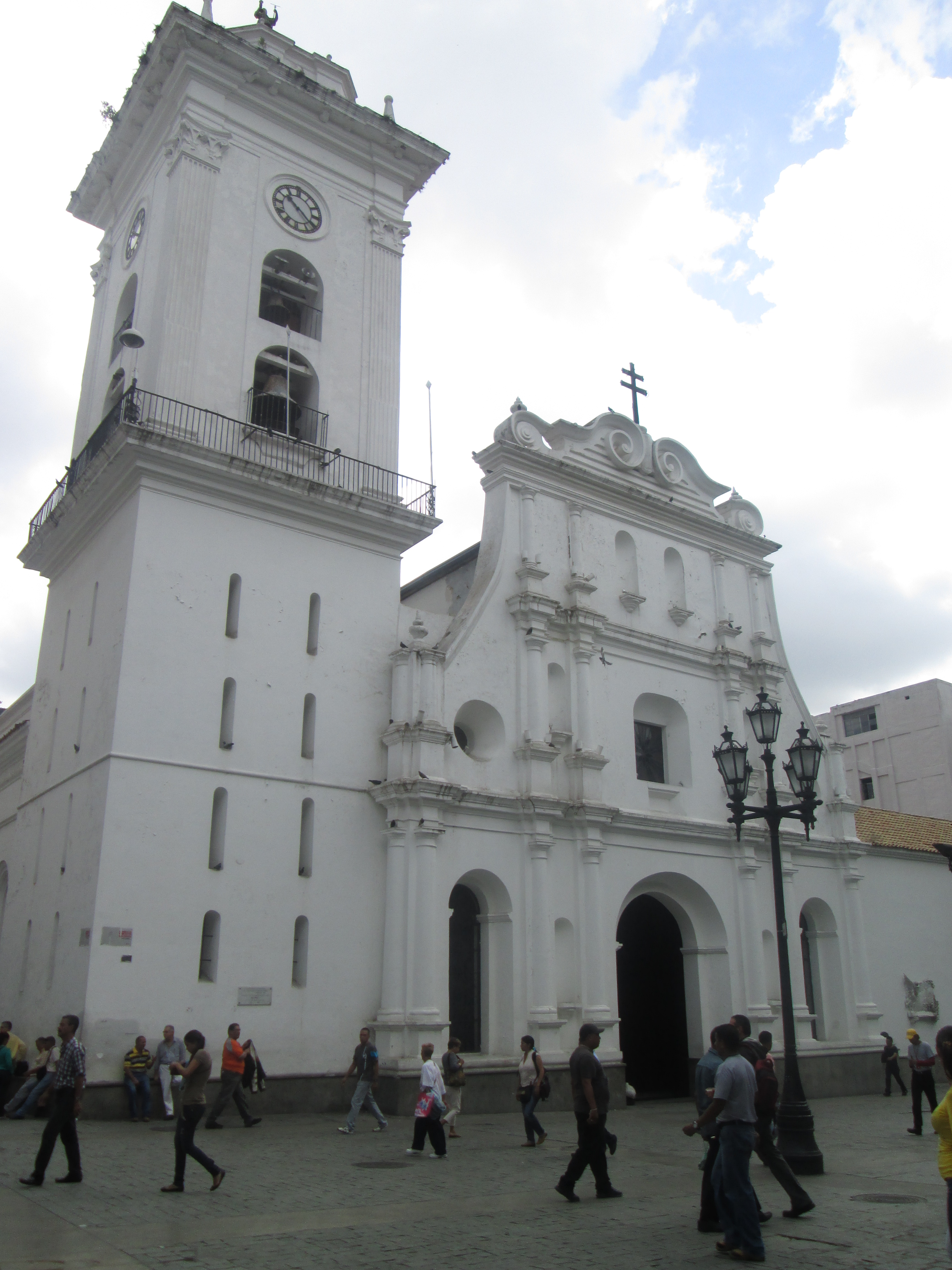
Caracas Cathedral is located on the Plaza Bolívar in Caracas.

The Catholic manifestations in Venezuela are very varied, which means that in many regions they venerate a Marian dedication or a specific saint, as well as the realization of various fairs, masses, processions and parties for each patron saint of Catholicism. In this way, for example, in Zulia the Chinita Fair is celebrated, in Nueva Esparta the Virgen del Valle is celebrated and in Lara, the Divina Pastora is celebrated.

=== Protestantism ===
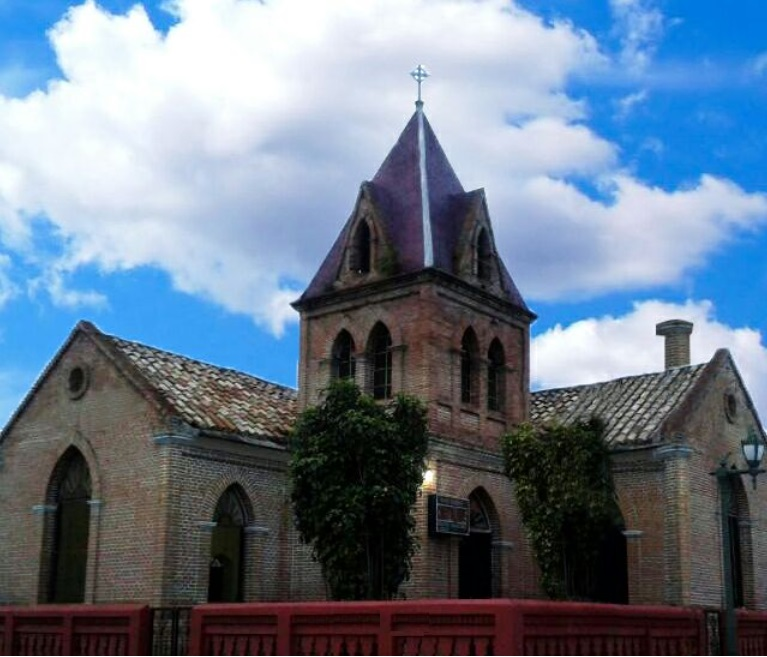
Cristo Vive Church in Rubio, the oldest evangelical facility church in Venezuela founded by Scandinavian missionaries.

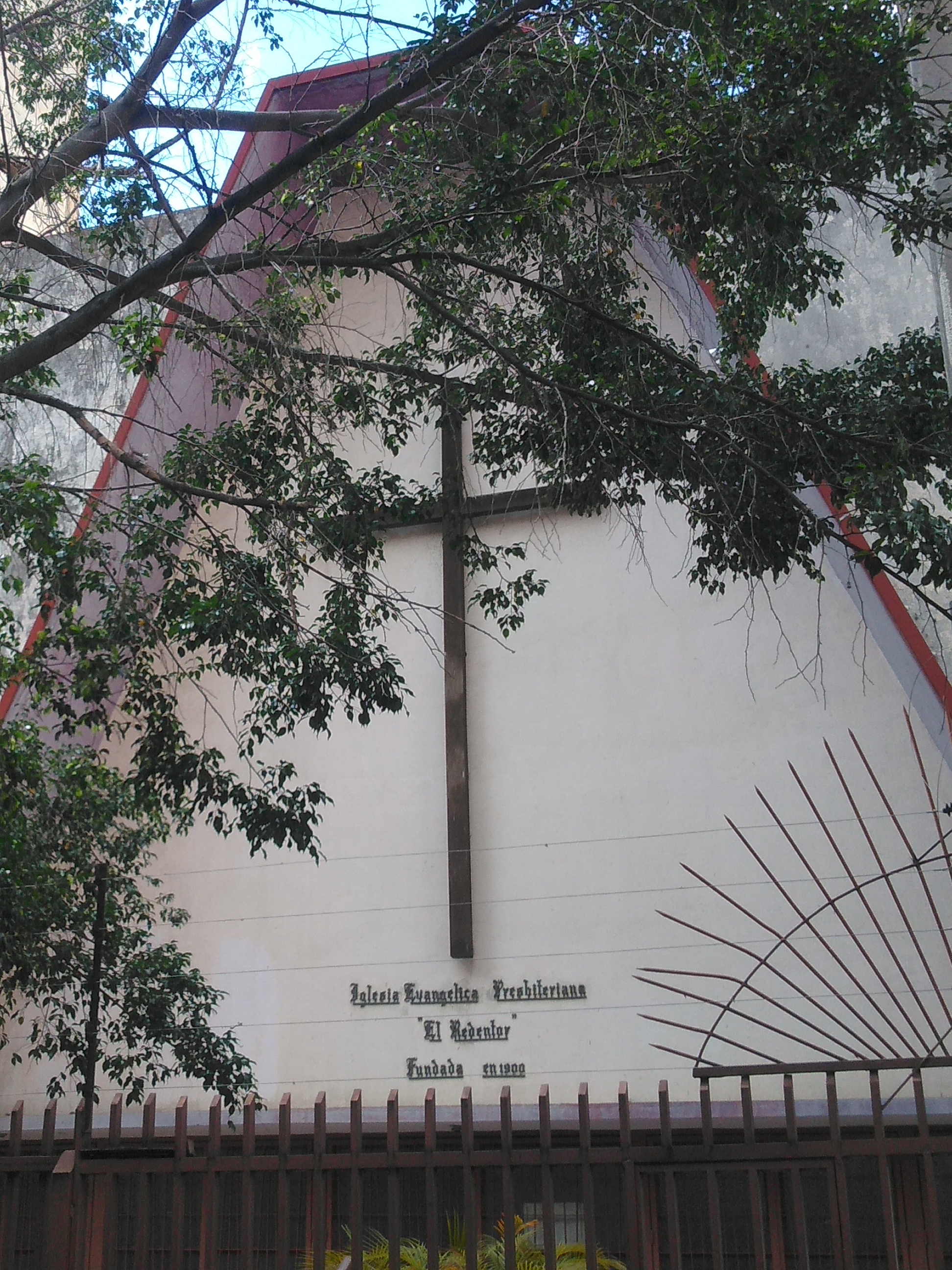
"El Redentor". Presbyterian Evangelical Church. The oldest congregation of Caracas, founded by Colombian and American missionaries

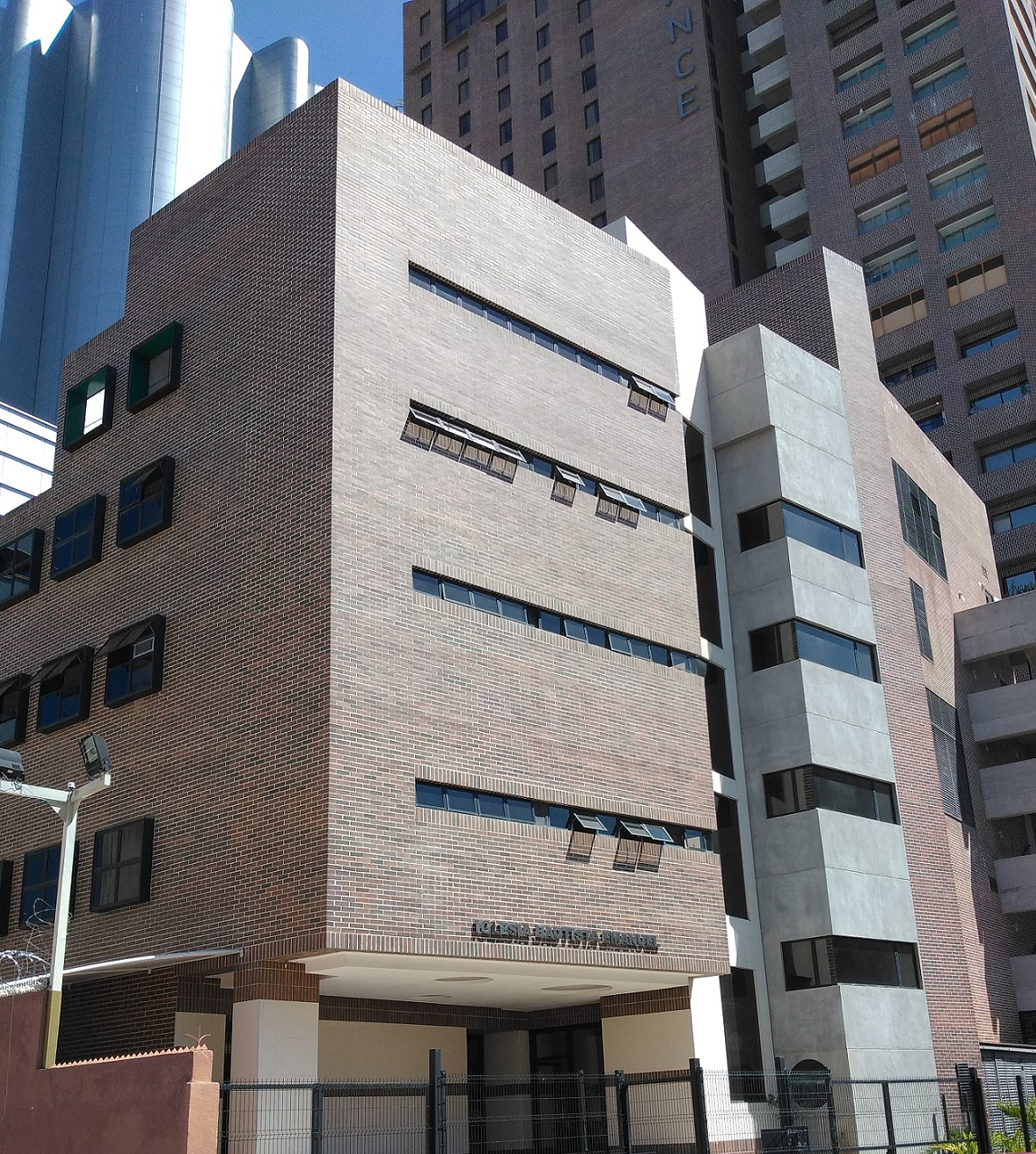
"Emanuel" Baptist Church, in La Castellana, Caracas. Founded by Venezuelan believers

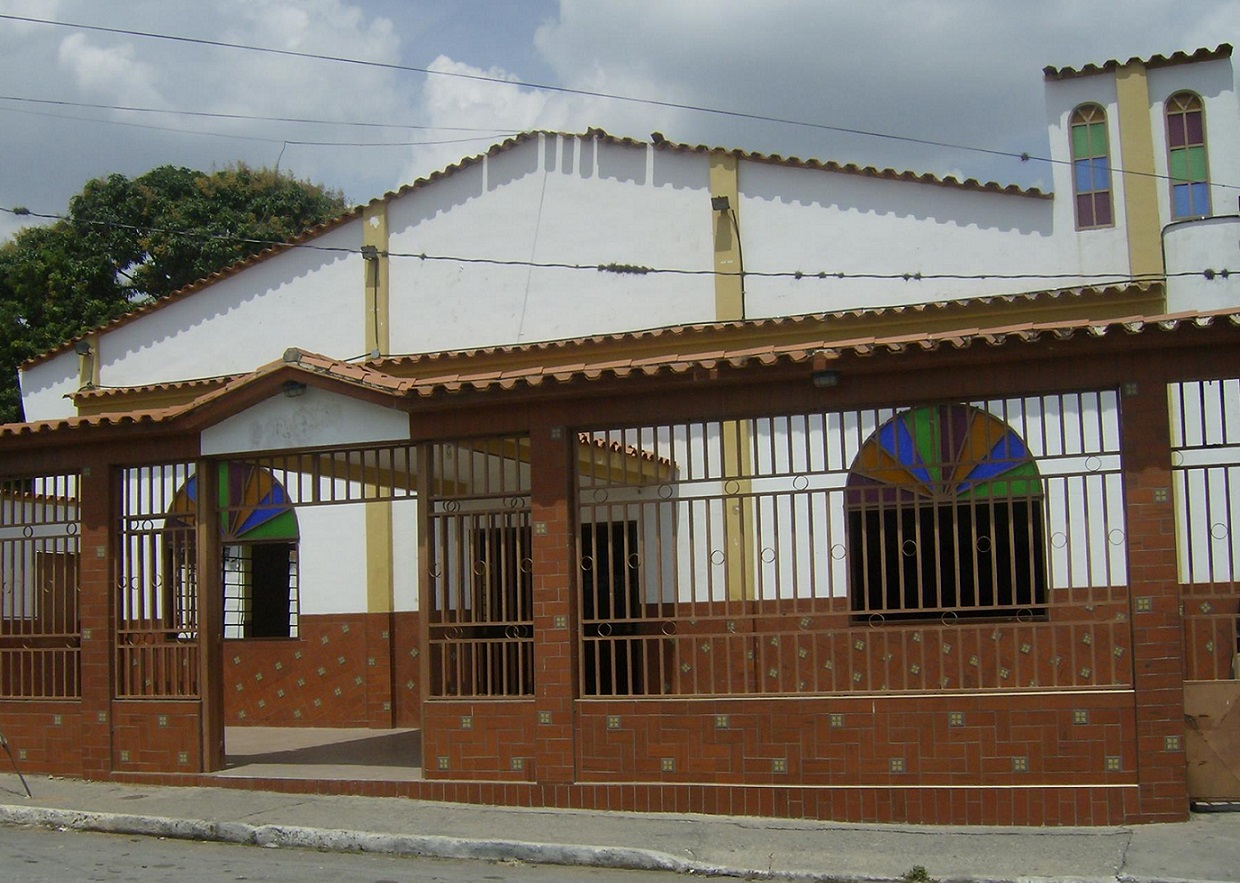
Sion - Assemblies of God, in Barquisimeto, founded by Venezuelan and American ladies.

Protestantism is a branch of Christianity that has its origins in the reform initiated by Martin Luther and other theologians as a critical response to the Catholic Church at the time. In general, Protestantism in Latin America has constituted, since the beginning of the Spanish conquest and colonization of America, a very minority sector of the Christian population that has been growing exponentially every decade. Protestantism was successful in several European nations, becoming predominant in the Scandinavian countries and in Northern Germany. In the following decades, various theological currents allowed the birth of various denominations, such as: Presbyterianism (which in turn became the official religion of Scotland, as the State Church de Kirk), Calvinism, Anabaptism in Switzerland and The Netherlands, Methodism in England, among others.

Motivated by poverty and in search of a better future, hundreds of thousands of northwestern Europeans saw their destiny in the United States of America and made it their new home, where they practiced the Protestant faith from different perspectives. The nation did not have a single national language officially, which allowed each church to celebrate its religious services in the languages of their countries of origin. That's why the existence of free evangelical (state) churches, regardless of denomination, with Swedish and Norwegian-Danish backgrounds, in addition to the German, Dutch and also English-speaking ones. All this was seen in the revivals known as: First Great Awakening, Second Great Awakening, Third Great Awakening and Fourth Great Awakening; being the Third Great Awakening the seedbed for the expansion of Protestantism towards Latin America and the Caribbean countries, and in the other continents.

In Venezuela, the increase in numbers began at the end of the 19th century after a series of religious openings. Prior to 1830, English-speaking Quakers were present in the capital city. So that, Protestantism has gradually become the second largest Christian community in the country after Catholicism. In this sense, according to the Evangelical Council of Venezuela, 20% of the population of Venezuela is evangelical Protestant. This is the result of several missionary efforts done across the country with foreign and national believers. One of the first Protestant churches built in Caracas was the Lutheran Church serving especially to the German speaking community living in Caracas. Then, the first denomination established to new believers in the nation was the Presbyterianism. "El Redentor" Presbyterian Evangelical Church is named as the oldest congregation of Caracas dating back to 1898, which merged from an earlier Methodist effort since 1878. The evangelicals have had a big motivation for establishing schooling with Christian belief emphasis, just like the Christiansen Academy, in Rubio, Venezuela; as well as Colegio Americano de Caracas (Presbyterian).

The spread of evangelical proselytizing was organized into different regions by diverse pioneer works:

Region	Early pioneer missions and denominations
Western region: Zulian region, Andean region and South-Western region	Scandinavian Alliance Mission of the Evangelical Free Church of America
Central-Western region	German-American Evangelical Pentecostal Holiness movement which mostly merged into Assemblies of God, and Baptist Church mainly associated to the Southern Baptist Convention.
Central region	The Swedish Evangelical Free Church of U.S.A.
Capital Region	Presbyterian Church in the U.S.A (Presbyterian), and the Christian and Missionary Alliance (Presbyterian)
Guayana and Amazona region	Baptist Mid-Missions
Eastern region: Anzoategui, Sucre, Monagas, and Margarita Island	Orinoco River Mission which later merged into The Evangelical Alliance Mission
Los Llanos region	In Guarico: The Swedish Evangelical Free Church of U.S.A. In Apure: Baptists which merged into Native Church

The Christian-Evangelical Churches of Venezuela, today, are mainly segmented into six major branches:

Protestant or Evangelical branch	%
Assemblies of God and other Pentecostals groups	60 %
Baptist Churches: Independent Baptists, Bible Baptists, and Reformed Baptists	16 %
Plymouth Brethren Church	9 %
Seventh-day Adventist Church	4 %
Evangelical Free Church	2 %
United Pentecostal Church	1 %

==== Other Evangelical Christian denominations ====
- Evangelical Foursquare Church
- Methodist Groups like: Free Methodist Church, and the United Methodist Church
- Wesleyan Church
- Evangelical Mennonites
- Church of God (Pentecostal)
- Church of God of Prophecy
- Church of the Nazarene (Holiness movement)
- Church of God Ministry of Jesus Christ International (Neopentecostal)
- Church of Christ
- Christ Apostolic Church

=== Eastern Orthodoxy ===
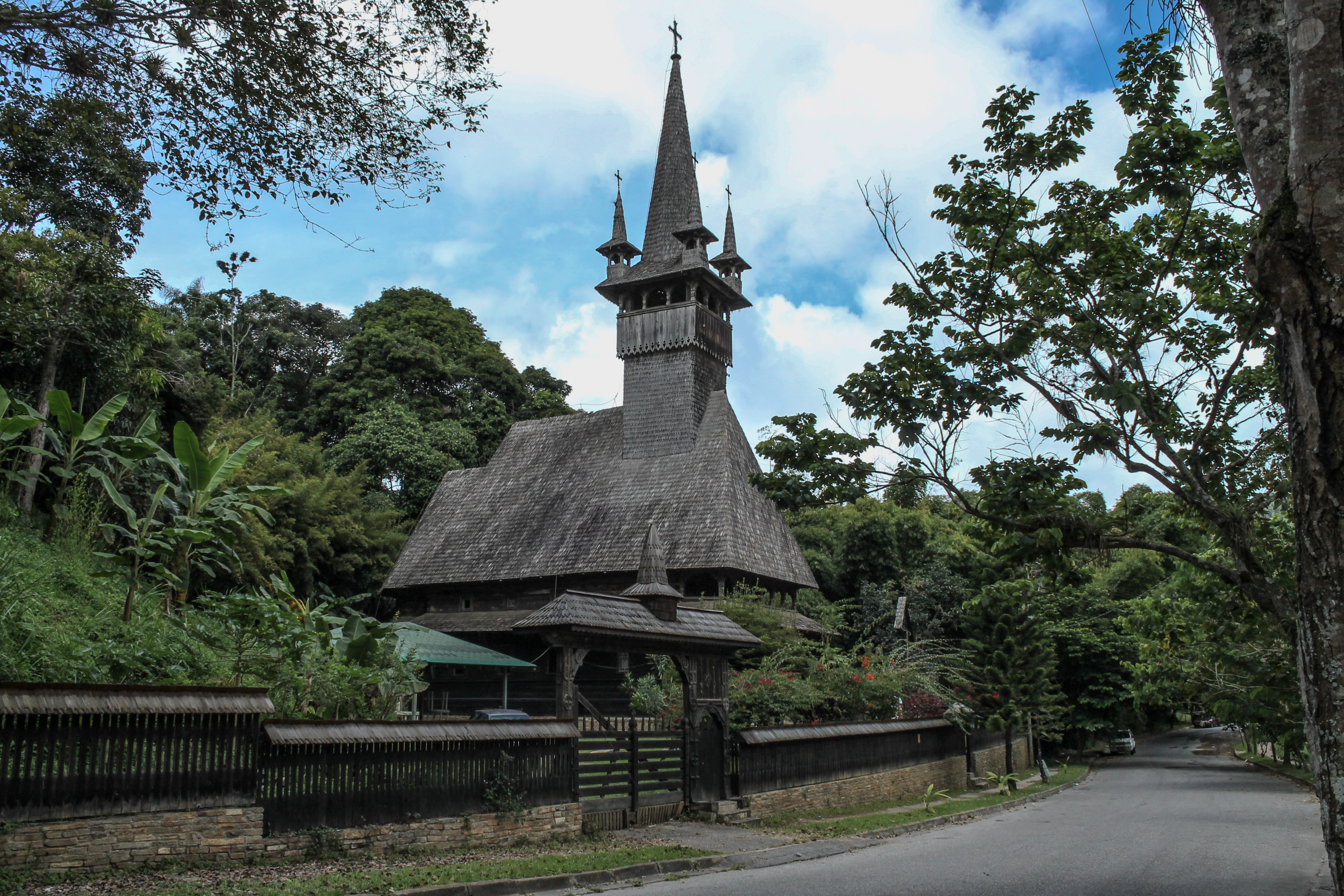
San Constantino y Elena Romanian Orthodox Church in El Hatillo, Caracas.

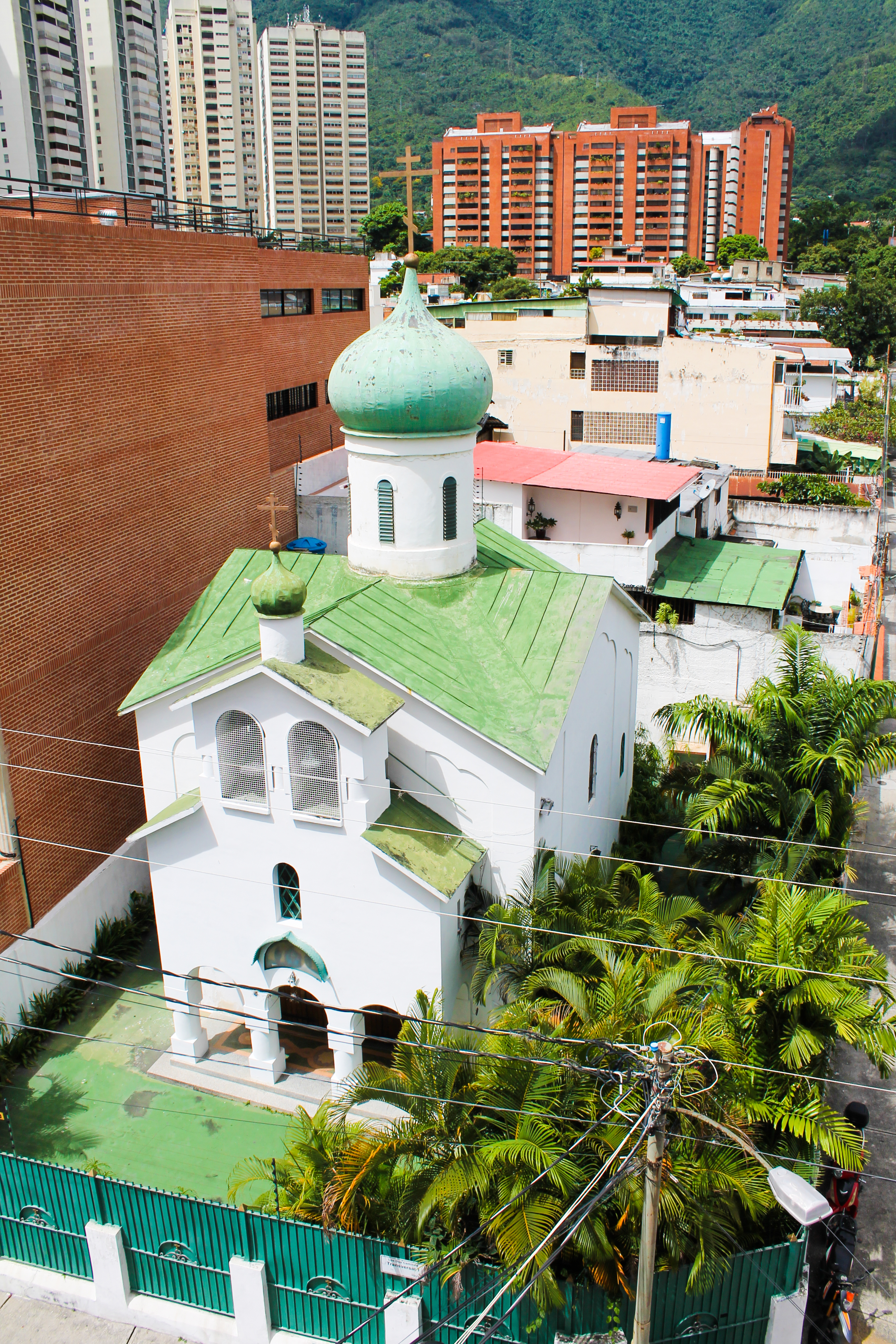
San Nicolás de Bari Russian Orthodox Church in Los Dos Caminos, Caracas.

The Eastern Orthodox Church in Venezuela has existed in Venezuela with the purpose of satisfying the spiritual needs of this religious groups, mainly made up of Russian, Serbian immigrants who arrived in the country since the end of World War II. It does not obey a planned system of religious proselytism, since church services were held in the immigrants' languages. Added to that group are the Greeks, Romanians and Ukrainians, who with the passing of the decades their descendants have maintained that faith in the country.

== Other religions ==
=== Hinduism ===
During the oil-related high-income years of the 1970s, there were around 400 non-resident Indians in the country. There are also several thousand of Indo-Caribbeans from Trinidad and Tobago, Suriname, and Guyana in the cities of Ciudad Guayana and Caracas.

The Indian community consisted of personnel from the petroleum and petrochemical sectors, as well as a large number of traders. Many of them had taken their families with them to Venezuela, whether from India or elsewhere. Most of the traders belonged to the Sindhi community but there were also some people from Gujarat, Punjab and the southern Indian States.

When the oil boom ended in 1982, followed by devaluation of the local currency, many of the non-resident Indians decided to seek their fortunes elsewhere. Currently, the Diaspora has been whittled down to half its former size. There are now only about 45 Indian families in Venezuela who are mainly engaged in retail trade. There are also a small number of experts in high tech. industries such as telecommunications.

All of them have adapted themselves very well to their country of residence and are generally held in high regard by the local people on account of their hard work, expertise and non-political nature.

The Venezuelan Constitution guarantees equal rights without discrimination to all expatriate personnel. This has facilitated the Indian community's life.

Another interesting feature is that many local people are interested in Indian religions and spirituality.

Some members of the Indian community also attend their functions. Most of the non-resident Indians are well educated. However, given their small numbers, they have not formed themselves into an active representative body. But they remain in touch with one another and with the Indian Embassy in Caracas. Even though they have little time to engage in numerous cultural activities, they do get together to celebrate Indian festivals like Diwali.

On the whole, the Indian community in Venezuela is quite prosperous and has a per capita income that is above the national average that is itself as high as US$8,300 in terms of PPP. They take an active part in mobilising donations to help in alleviating distress at times of national calamities in India.

In 2010, there were 580 Hindus in Venezuela according to the Association of Religion Data Archives.

== See also ==
- History of the Jews in Venezuela
- Islam in Venezuela
