= Economic history of Venezuela =

Venezuela, officially the Bolivarian Republic of Venezuela, is a country located on the northern coast of South America. It is known for its large proven oil reserves. Venezuela was historically among the wealthiest economies in South America, particularly from the 1950s to 1980s. During the 21st century, under the leadership of socialist populist Hugo Chávez Venezuela’s economy grew consistently, achieving its highest GDP of $482.36 billion in 2014 according to World Bank. Under his successor Nicolás Maduro, the Venezuelan economy has collapsed, prompting millions of citizens to flee Venezuela. Multiple factors contributed including a steep decline in the global price of oil and economic sanctions by the United States. GDP has fallen by 80 percent in less than a decade.

Before oil was discovered, Venezuelan production was primarily agriculture, such as coffee and cocoa. After the first commercial drilling for oil in 1917, oil production increased drastically due to the oil boom of the 1920s and was later furthered by World War II, as Venezuela supplied oil to the United States. From 1958 to 1989, democratic leaders attempted to use the large oil revenues to invest in other industry through various policies such as import substitution and other programs designed to diversify the Venezuelan economy away from a highly specialised export range. These attempts, for the most part, were unsuccessful as Venezuelan government revenues continued to be highly volatile due to the fluctuating price of oil, which was reflected especially throughout the 1980s due to the oil price crash. After struggling with fiscal debts due to a variety of trade protection measures and other policies, the President of 1989, President Andrés Pérez, worked with the International Monetary Fund in an attempt to rectify some of the issues plaguing the Venezuelan government. Perez was eventually unsuccessful due to political instability due to proposed austerity measures

Hugo Chávez was later elected in 1998, after a defeat of both major political parties. The Chávez government begun enacting various socialist programs, such as free education and healthcare. These programs would continue up until Chávez's death in 2013. President Nicolás Maduro, Chávez's successor, was elected on 14 April 2013 and pledged to continue Chávez's work. However, due to hyperinflation, shortages of food and medicine and political instability, about 3 million Venezuelans have fled the country since 2015.

== Economic and political events from 1913–2002 ==
=== 1913–1958: Military rule, beginning of oil production ===
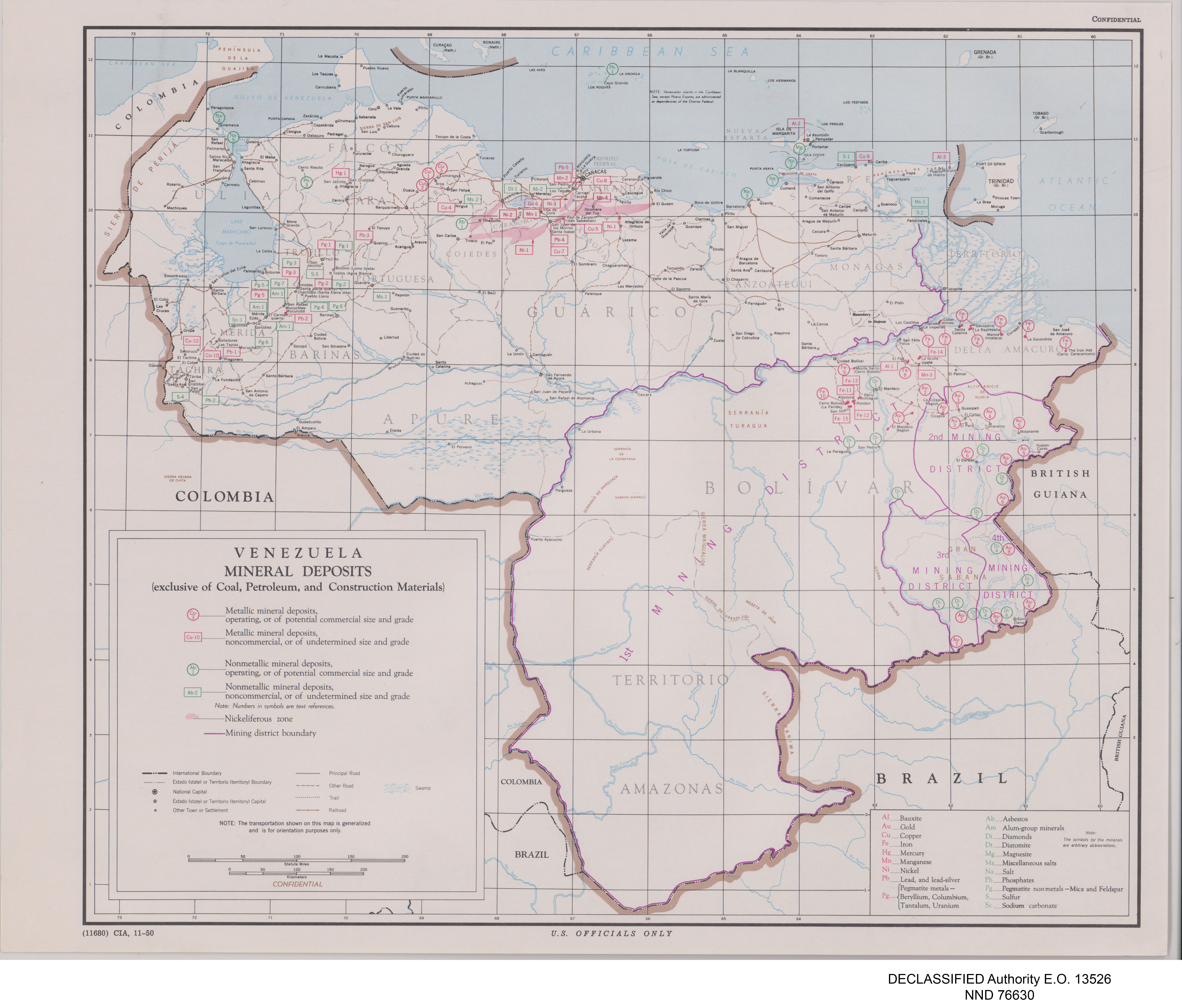
Map of mineral deposits in Venezuela, 1950

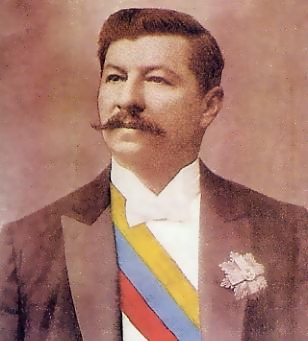
Juan Vicente Gómez, military general and dictator of Venezuela from 1908 to 1935

In 1913, Dictator Juan Vicente Gomez issued a concession to explore twelve of the twenty Venezuelan states for oil to the Royal Dutch-Shell Oil Company. The first commercial drilling for oil in Venezuela occurred in 1917, however the existence of oil was known before this. Along with the oil boom of the 1920s, World War I was important in triggering Venezuelan oil production^{[1]}. Shortly after this, the oil boom of the 1920s meant Venezuela became the wealthiest state in Latin America. Investment and oil exports increased tremendously during the period from 1920 to 1935. The share of oil exports on total exports in Venezuela increased from 1.9% to 91.2% this period due to the commercialisation of Venezuelan oil.

During this period, agricultural production declined drastically, resulting in an economic phenomenon known as ‘The Dutch Disease’, where a commodity increases income for one sector of the economy to the detriment of other sectors due to a strong currency.

In 1936, the Venezuelan government first introduced the idea named ‘Sembrar el petróleo’, meaning ‘to sow the oil’. The idea of this was that oil revenues were fleeting, and so reinvesting oil income into agriculture and other industry would benefit Venezuela. This ended up having limited effects in the economy as World War II broke out and Venezuela continued supplying large amounts of oil to the United States. Through the 1950s, the Venezuelan economy grew at a healthy rate despite rampant corruption and deceit for foreign companies and the indifferent stance of the government.

=== 1958–1989: Democracy, creation of OPEC ===
In 1958 Venezuela elected President Rómulo Betancourt in a presidential election after a military coup ousted the first democratically elected president of Venezuela, President Rómulo Gallegos. Rómulo Betancourt's government founded the Central Office of Coordination and Planning (also known as Cordiplan) which issued multiyear plans with broad economic development objectives Throughout his tenure, the government pursued social projects such as improving health, education and access to potable water, an effort propelled by the Democratic Action Party that Rómulo Betancourt belonged to. These efforts were mainly focused on improving education and health in an attempt to diversify Venezuelan exports away from oil to encourage other industry to develop. Despite these efforts, the government made little progress towards diversifying its own revenue streams, passing reforms of its oil policy with the Hydrocarbons Act of 1943. The Hydrocarbons Act changed the basis of oil income from concessions and customs revenue to taxes based on income from mining. Coupled with Venezuela's oil revenues and thus an increasing dependence on them, this act led to a heavy reliance on government oil revenues rather than conventional revenues such as income tax. As well as this, in 1960 the Organisation of the Petroleum Exporting Countries (OPEC) was created. Venezuela, along with Iran, Iraq, Kuwait and Saudi Arabia were its founding members. Despite the creation of OPEC in 1960, they only began setting the oil price in 1973. To do so, the member countries seized their domestic production of oil to control the price and quantity at which oil was exported at in each member country. In Venezuela, the government resolved to stop giving out concessions, and later semi-nationalised its oil and steel industries in 1973.

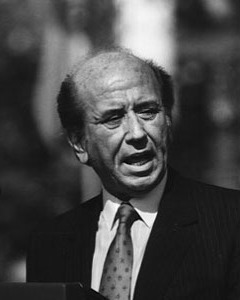
President Carlos Andrés Pérez

From 1972 to 1974, world oil prices rose drastically and almost quadrupled Venezuelan government revenue. During this period President Carlos Andrés Pérez was elected and pledged to make Venezuela a developed country within a few years, known as 'La Gran Venezuela', through policies revolving around financing state-owned and enterprise-led industrialisation in order to facilitate heavy import substitution as a rebirth of the ‘sow the oil’ campaign as well as price controls, income increases and fighting poverty. Import substitution industrialisation (ISI) was a popular method of industrialisation in the 1970s, especially in Latin America. It, ideally, would stimulate economic growth and development through establishing (and protecting) domestic production of goods that were otherwise imported. To further the ‘sowing of the oil’, government spending increased by 26 per cent per year and established many new state-owned businesses as well as purchasing private ones in an effort to stimulate economic growth and development, and further the policy of import substitution. In 1976, the government fully nationalised the Venezuelan oil industry with the creation of 'Petróleos de Venezuela' (Oils of Venezuela, or PDVSA). In its first year of operation, Petróleos de Venezuela had three affiliates known as Lagoven, Maraven and Corpoven. Together, Petróleos de Venezuela produced a total of 2.3 million barrels of oil a day in its first year.

Despite the oil boom of the 1970s greatly benefiting Venezuela in terms of export revenues and development, due to large government projects and heavy spending, the Venezuelan government had an increased indebtedness as well as a inflation problem due to the price hike. These issues typified the presidential campaigns of 1978–1979 due to concerns about the rapid rate of public and private expansion. Despite these concerns, the newly elected president Luis Herrera Campins continued the frenzy of government spending after oil prices surged again from 1978 to 1982. Due to this dismissal of growing problems with debt and government expenditure, when oil prices declined in the mid 1980s due to an oversupply of oil. This resulted in a seventy percent decrease in the price of oil from November 1985 to March 1986. Given that Venezuelan oil revenues represented almost 60 percent of total government revenue, this had a large effect on government finance and exacerbated the problems Venezuela was already dealing with in terms of fiscal policy and the exchange rate. As a result, the national debt multiplied and the government could no longer support its large array of protections such as price controls and subsidies, as well as over four hundred state-owned businesses. As well as struggling with debt and currency issues, in the late 1980s inflation in Venezuela rose to 84.5% in 1989. Through 1983 to 1989, there were attempts to recover from the oil shock of 1983 by devaluing the currency, increased import protection and other methods of protection, to little degree of success due to high inflation, interest rates and widespread corruption. In 1989, President Carlos Andres Perez was elected and attempted to combat these issues using various International Monetary Fund (IMF) loans and other austerity measures, however this ultimately resulted in what is now known as the 'Caracazo'. This refers to the series of protests, riots and lootings that occurred on 27 February 1989, after the 'Structural Adjustment Package' (a series of policies such as privatising utilities, remove import tariffs and other policies designed to reduce the fiscal deficit, was launched by President Perez.

=== 1990–2012: Hugo Chávez ===
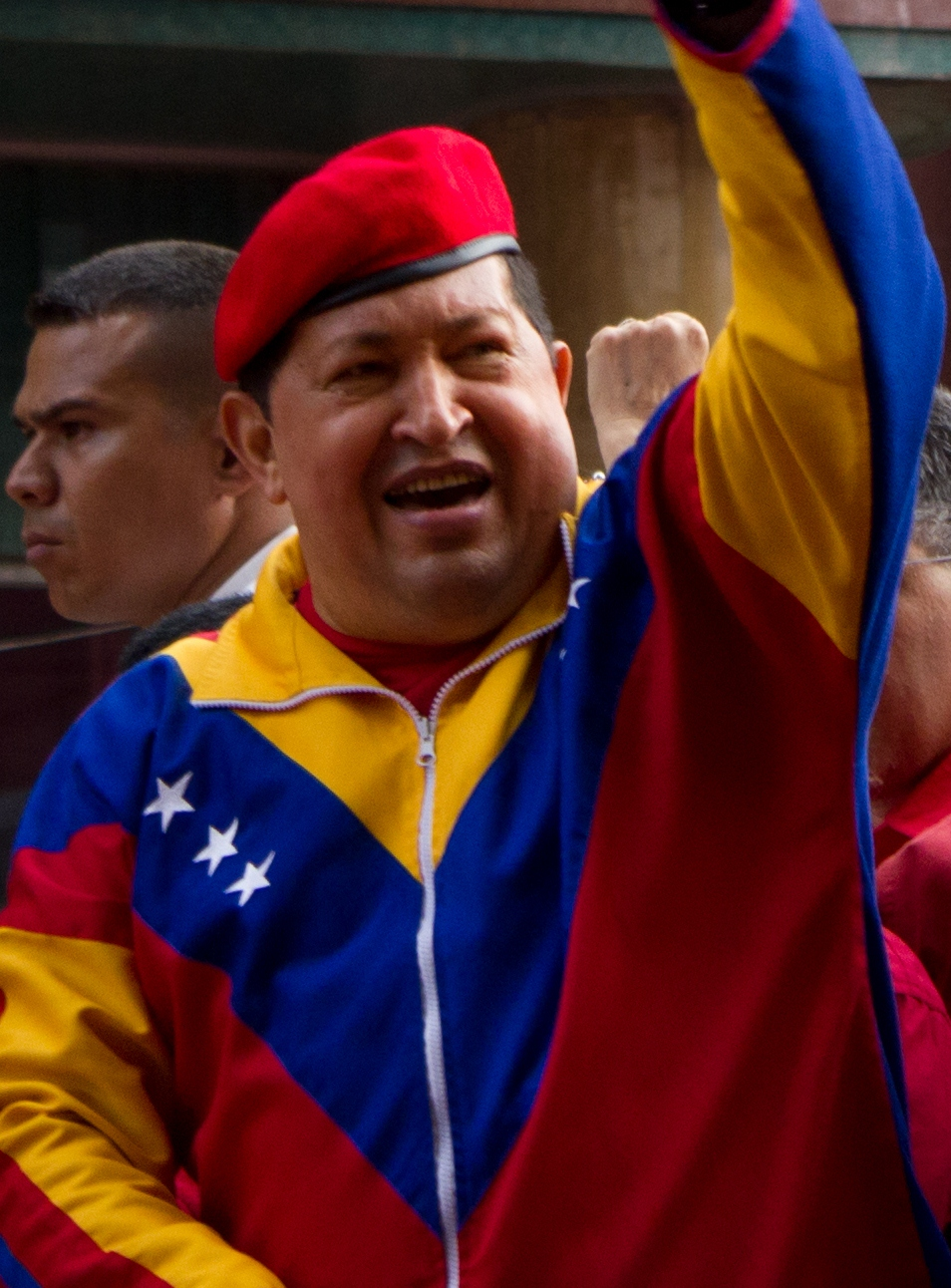
Hugo Chávez in 2012

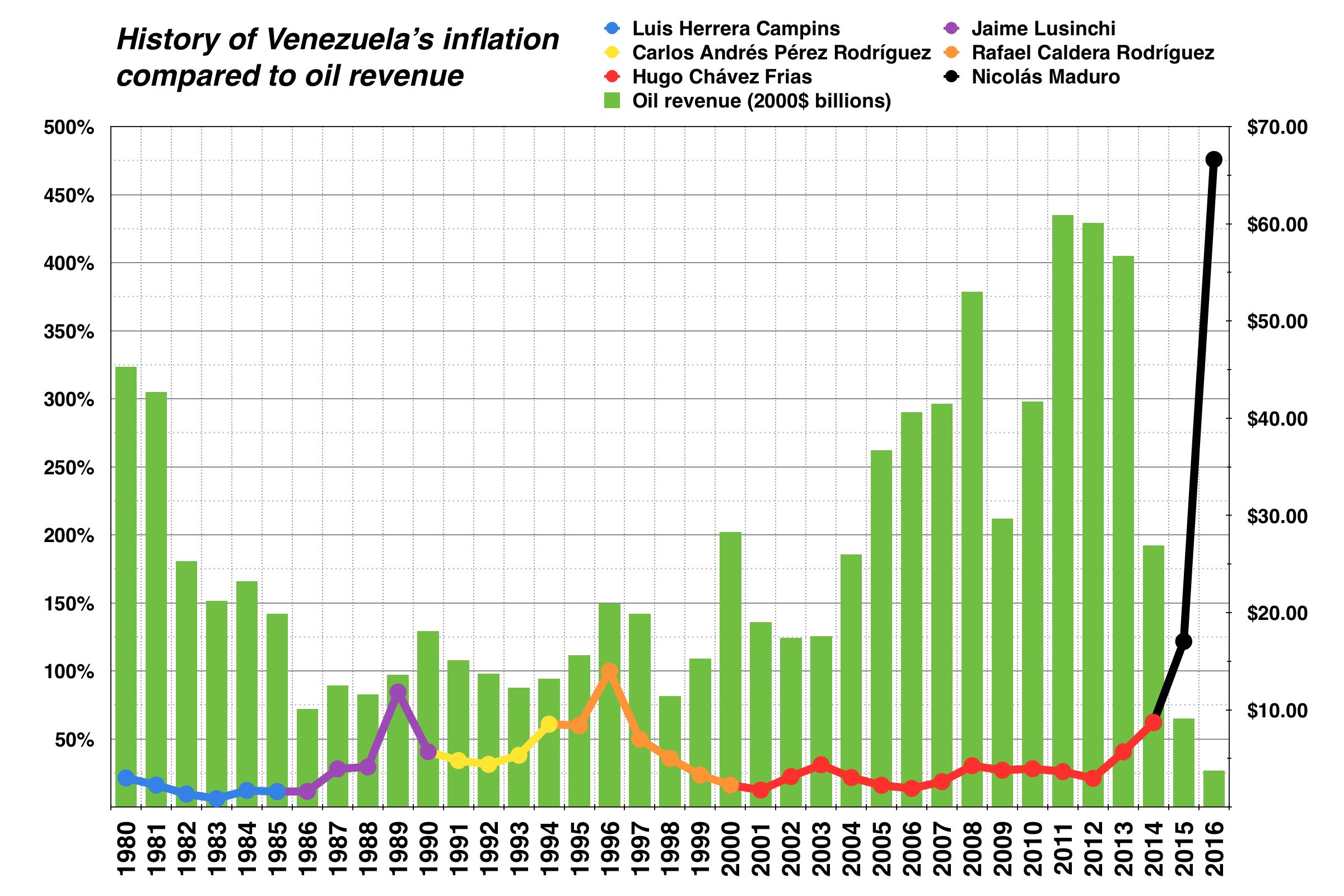
Venezuela historic inflation vs. oil revenue

In 1992, the then colonel Hugo Chávez and his supporters made 2 coup attempts, resulting in 2 years jail time. During this time, Chávez met with Luis Miquilena, a left-wing activist who ultimately advised Chávez to pursue his political ambitions through the electoral process. Consequently, after his release in 1994, Chávez began to pursue politics instead of military power, and created the party 'Movement for the Fifth Republic'. After the election of 1994 in which Raphael Caldera, the Copei party leader was elected president, Chávez began to gain support and in 1998, both major parties were defeated and Chávez was elected. Chávez's party offered an anti corruption, anti poverty programs and a more pacifistic democracy, where the major concerns would be the welfare of the people. He began his presidency by proposing a new Constitution and held a referendum to decide if the people would support this. Chávez received 71% of the votes in the referendum, allowing for the creation of a new Venezuelan constitution. This constitution was later created by the people electing delegates to a constitutional assembly in order to form the new constitution. When the project was submitted to the public in December 1999, it received a 72% yes vote, allowing Chávez to introduce the new constitution, named the Constitution of the Bolivarian Republic of Venezuela, named after Simon Bolivar, a military hero from the Wars of Independence in South America Throughout this time, multiple referendums and elections were used to enact various constitutional reforms to strengthen power over these institutions.

Before Chávez took office on 2 February 1999, he visited the leaders of the OPEC countries and later the OPEC countries convened in Caracas, Venezuela for the second OPEC summit in September 2000. The meeting involved reestablishing OPEC as a leader in the world oil market as well as recovering oil prices, as Venezuela had become one of the cartel's most unreliable producers in regards to the quotas set by OPEC.

In 2001, Chávez used the enabling act, which allowed the president to enact various laws without legislative approval, to enact over 49 laws designed to redistribute land and wealth in Venezuela. This action caused some business and labour circles to grow vary of attempts to consolidate economic and political power. During this time, the new Hydrocarbons Act was also introduced, increasing the taxes companies were required to pay for oil exploitation. Tensions within the country came to a head in 2002 when a coup removed Chávez from power for several days, exploiting the media in Venezuela in order to promote the coup and associated strike as well. This continued for several days until business leader Pedro Carmona and his vice president Diosdado Cabello were removed from Miraflores Palace and Chávez was restored to power. After the coup, Chávez began to purge political opponents from the armed forces, solidifying his power over the institution, as well as later firing 18000 workers at PDVSA who went on general strike in an attempt to force Chávez out of power. The general strike and the aftermath of it allowed Chávez to retake control of PDVSA. The strike cost Venezuela approximately 13.5 billion dollars in direct loses due to the shutdown of PDVSA for over two months and the need to import oil and gas from Brazil to run transport and other facilities.

In 2004, Chávez and his government returned to furthering their programs promoting welfare and the redistribution of wealth across the Venezuelan people, particularly focused on the poorer areas of the country. These programs were known as 'misiones' and allowed (and were staffed by) many Cuban teachers, doctors and paramedics to practice in Venezuela and were financed by oil export revenues. After winning the referendum (a 'recall' referendum designed to oust Chávez), he continued to forward the programs established beforehand and further consolidating power by increasing control over the judiciary sector. In 2003, the central bank suspended auctions of dollars.

After President Chávez died in 2013, his successor, Nicolás Maduro, was elected to power.

=== 2013–Present: Nicolás Maduro ===
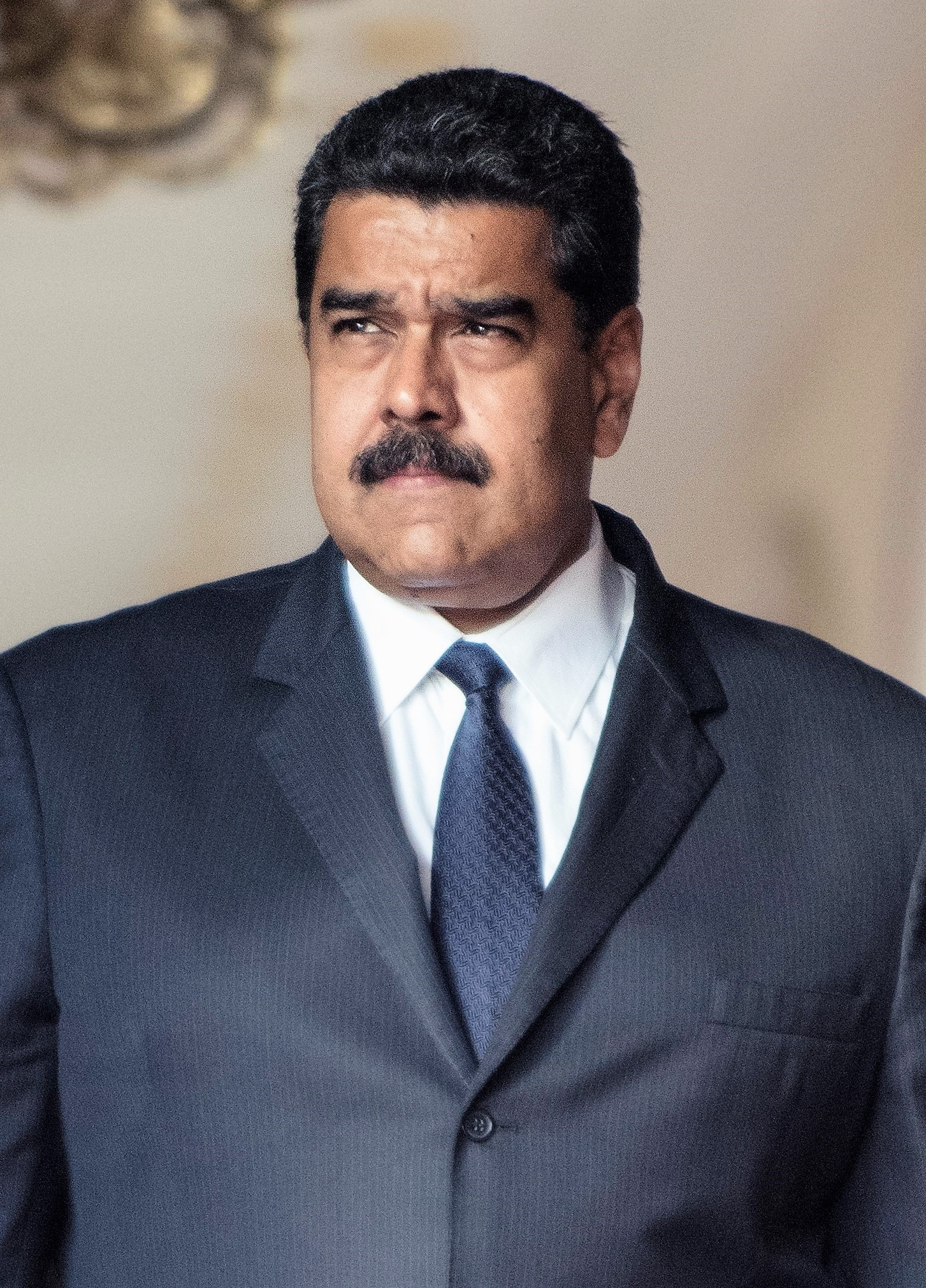
Nicolás Maduro in 2016.

With the election of President Maduro on 14 April 2013, Chávez's successor was sworn into power. In 2014, nationwide protests broke out, beginning in the Táchira and Mérida state in response to the attempted rape of a female student, as well as record inflation and shortages of basic goods. These protests ended in violence, and later resulted in US sanctions against several Venezuelan officials. In response, the Maduro government gave the President the power to legislate by decree for nine months. In 2016, the situation resulted in Maduro calling a state of emergency as shortages for basic goods resulted in long queues and inflation increased to over 700%. This trend of hyperinflation (where inflation rises more than 50% every month) results in a large currency devaluation and due to continuously high prices of goods and services, hoarding of said goods and services. Due to this, the United Nations estimate that about 3 million Venezuelans have fled due to hyperinflation, shortages of food and medicine and political violence.

== See also ==
- Economic history of Latin America
