= Fauna of Venezuela =

Native animals of Venezuela

The fauna of Venezuela consists of a huge variety of animals. Venezuela's diverse wildlife includes manatees, Amazon river dolphins, and Orinoco crocodiles, which have been reported to reach up to 6.6 metres (22 ft) in length. Some 23% of reptilian and 50% of amphibian species that inhabit the country are endemic to Venezuela. Overall, around 8,000 species (the world's 5th highest total) are endemic to the country.

Venezuela hosts a total of 1,417 bird species, more than 351 mammals, 341 reptiles, 315 amphibians and more than 2,000 freshwater and marine fishes. Invertebrates groups have not been inventoried exhaustively, but among the well known groups there are around 900 species of marine molluscs, 1,600 butterflies, over 120 dung beetles species and 39 species of blowflies.

== Birds ==
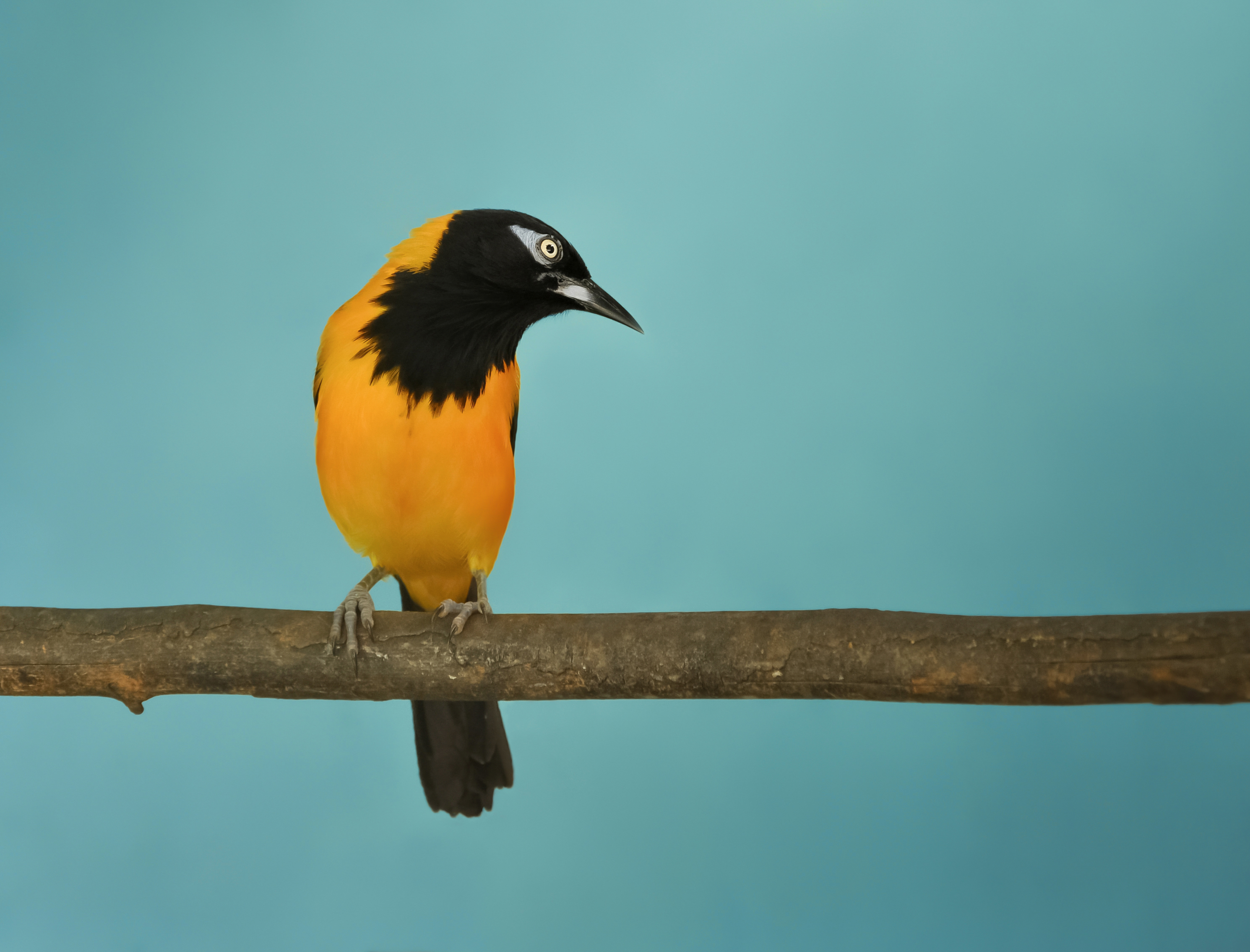
The Venezuelan troupial is the national bird of Venezuela.

There are 1,416 bird species in Venezuela, 45 of which are endemic. Forty-eight bird species that reside in Venezuela are considered threatened, and seven species have been introduced to the country. Important birds include ibises, ospreys, kingfishers, and the yellow-orange Venezuelan troupial, the national bird.

Several expeditions to collect and document bird species in Venezuela took place in the 1930s and 1940s. These included one to Amazonas state by Ernest G. Holt for the Smithsonian, collecting over 3,000 specimens; a party led by William H. Phelps and his son, including Ernest Thomas Gilliard and Fèlix Cardona i Puig, which recorded over 2,000 specimens on Auyán-tepui; and a small collection amassed by F. D. Smith in Anzoátegui and Monagas. The Phelps family contributed significantly to the study of Venezuelan ornithology; an American explorer, William H. Phelps Sr. traveled extensively to the country, where his son was born and raised and where the William Phelps Ornithological Collection is kept. This collection grew from a series of expeditions to Venezuela's islands, tepuis, rural flatlands, great plains, and deserts.

From the Phelps collection, at least 300 species have been identified, and the authoritative guides to birds of Venezuela have been developed.

=== Habitat diversity ===
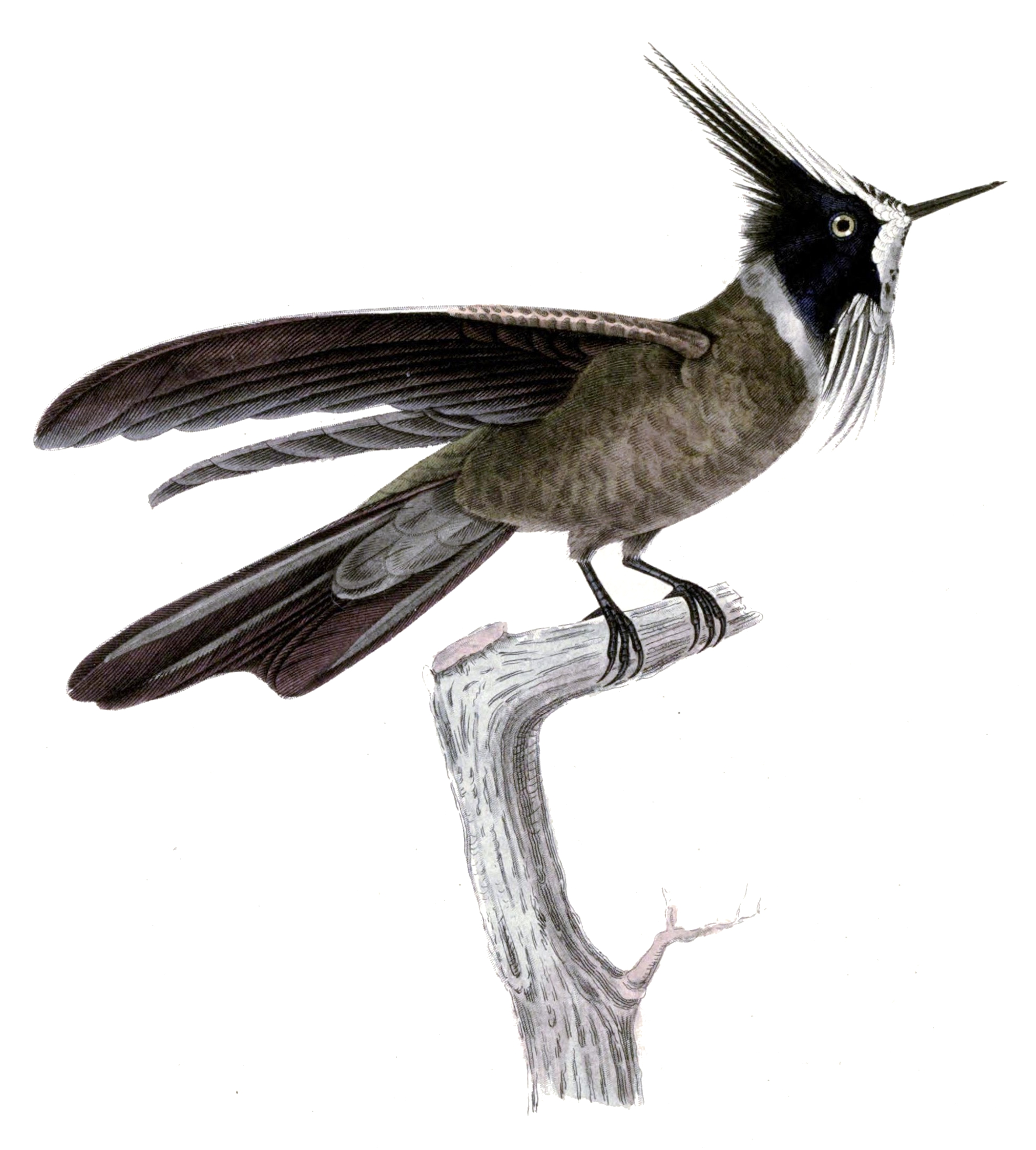
The white-bearded helmetcrest is only found in northwestern Venezuela

Some birds resident in Venezuela span a variety of habitats; others are restricted to areas with certain types of vegetation. Birds which can live in any area of Venezuela, including its cities, include the bananaquit, black vulture, blue-gray tanager, great egret, and the tropical mockingbird, among others. Most birds of Venezuela span various habitats, but a few are specialized to only one area, typically due to extreme location or dependence on a certain resource; species restricted in this way include the Carrizal seedeater, maroon-chested ground dove, point-tailed palmcreeper, Río Orinoco spinetail, white-bearded helmetcrest and the white-plumed antbird. Venezuela has particularly bio-diverse habitats, allowing for different types of specialist birds.

The Tinamidae of Venezuela are typically found in forests, living on the land and roosting in low-lying branches. Odontophoridae also live in the forest and on the ground; there is one native Venezuelan species of this family, and it spends more time in the open than the others. The Cracidae are typical of the forest but have more diverse habitats, including one species living in Venezuela that has adapted to urban environments; they also are more often found in trees than on the ground.

The large water birds Anhimidae are found in watery areas of the country, but roost in trees more often than their smaller counterparts the Anatidae, a migratory family of water birds, do; these are also found in most areas of Venezuela where there is water. The even smaller Podicipedidae live exclusively in the water; only two species of these live in Venezuela: both are native and live in freshwater. One species of Diomedeidae can be found in Venezuela; they live almost exclusively around water at sea, visiting land to breed.

=== Birds of Northern Venezuela ===
==== Breeding ====
Observed in 1955 by Gilliard, the nesting and breeding season for birds across the regions in the north of Venezuela begins in late April. Gilliard, with great assistance from the Phelps family, sampled the entire northern region from sea level to 5,000 feet. Gilliard and Ramón Urbano determined that the birds begin nesting as the rainy season begins, a conclusion supported by other ornithologists working in the region. Gilliard then comments on the different natures of some species, particularly those whose habitats span a range of altitudes, to have indeterminate and/or cyclic breeding periods. Thirty-two species were recorded on this expedition, many of which were breeding during late April and early May.

==== Diets ====
In 1994, the diets of land birds in the northeastern regions of Venezuela were estimated by Canadian researchers. They concluded that most of the species of birds examined were "generalist feeders", and so ate a variety of both plants and invertebrate animals; of the invertebrates, the most common prey for birds in the region were beetles, ants and insect larvae. The researchers do note that most of the hummingbirds differed by eating largely soft-bodied arthropods and having a low nectar intake; most of the species ate plenty of fruit. On the odd occasion, some small mammals were captured by birds; kingfishers also demonstrated eating fish.

== Mammals ==
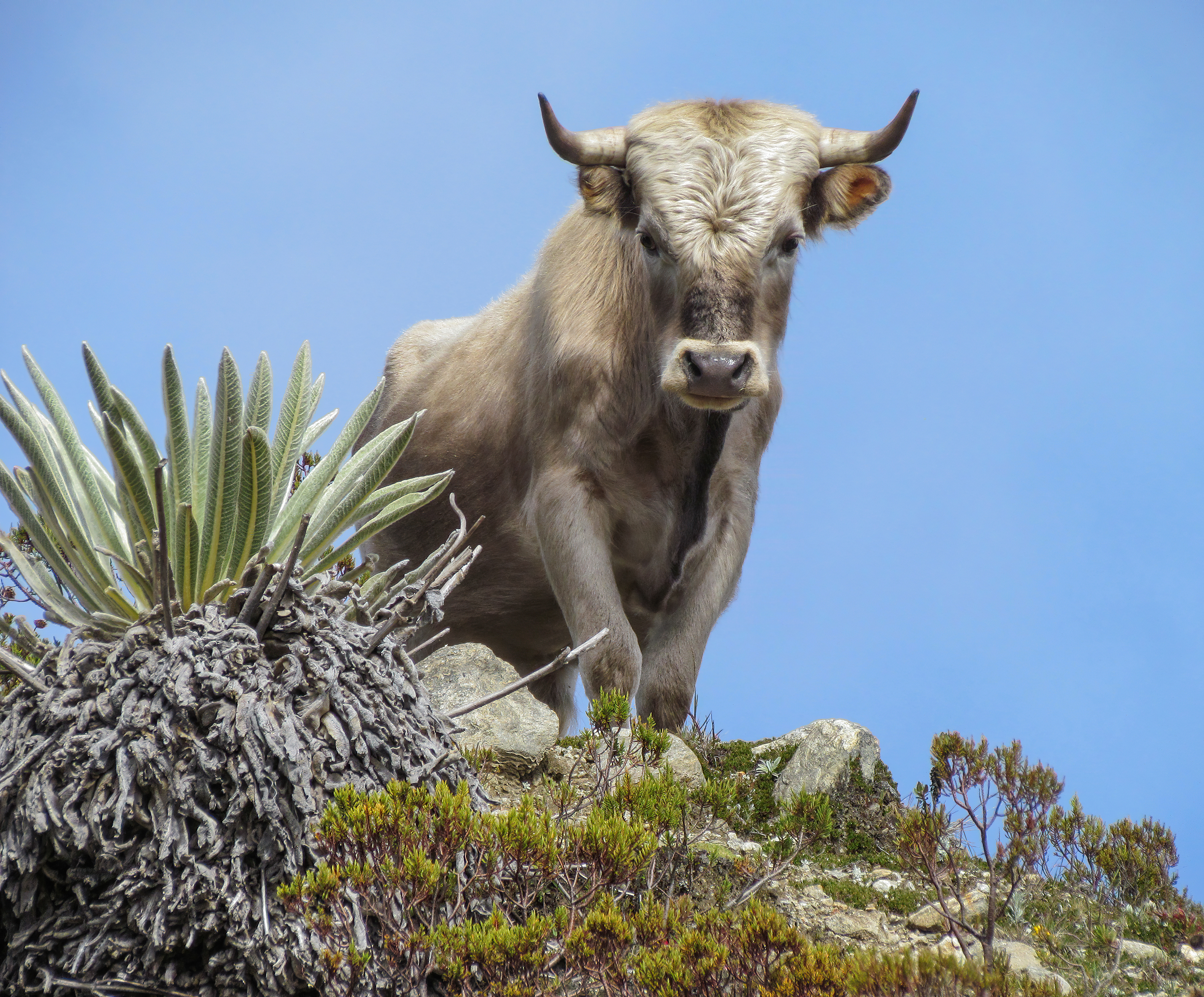
Charolais cattle, Sierra Nevada, Venezuela

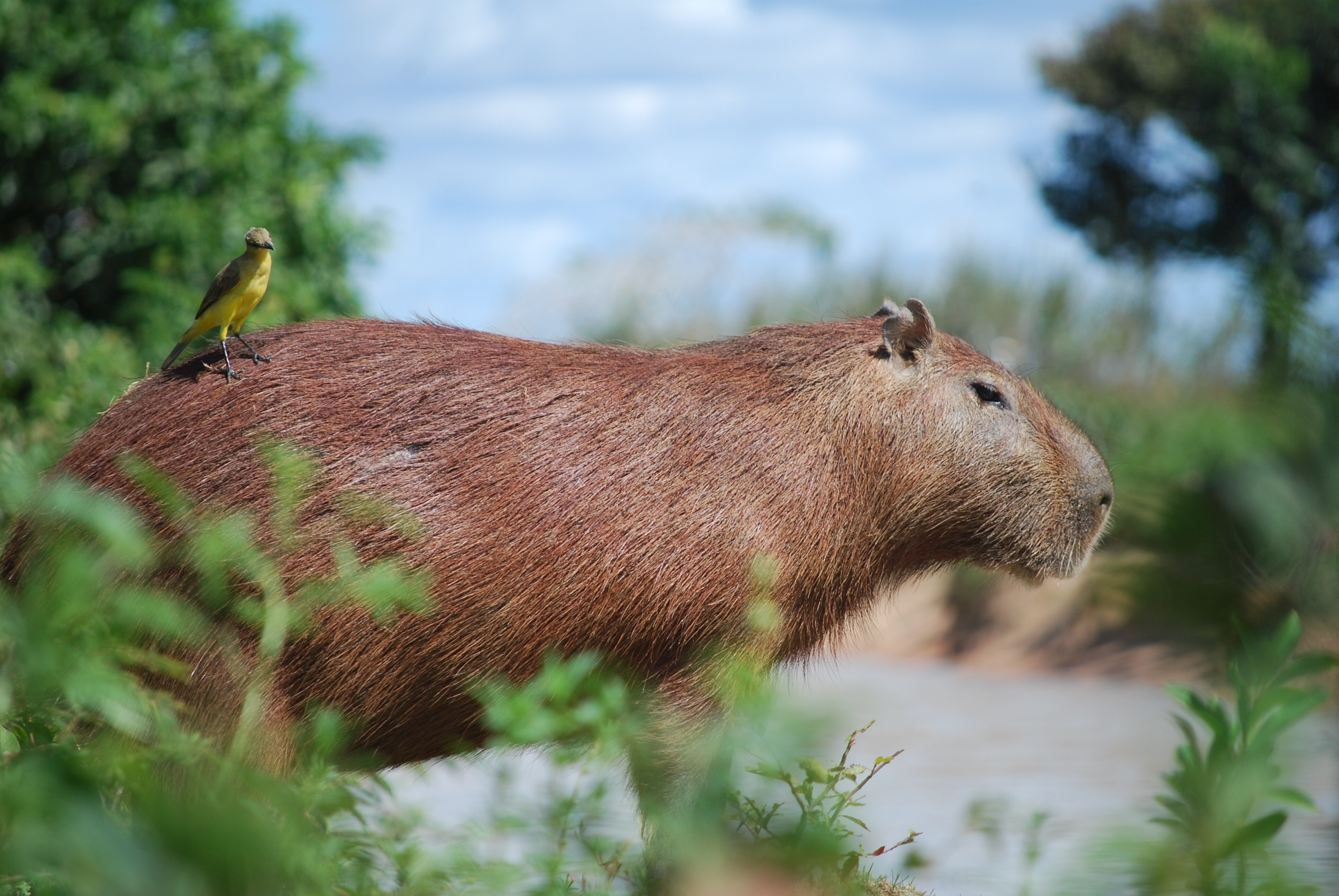
A capybara native to Venezuela, the largest rodent

Notable mammals include the giant anteater, jaguar, howler monkey, venezuelan fish-eating rat, and the capybara, the world's largest rodent. More than half of Venezuelan avian and mammalian species are found in the Amazonian forests south of the Orinoco.

Some of the more fascinating mammals native to Venezuela include the howler monkey, capybara, giant anteater, giant otter, white-bellied spider monkey, crab-eating fox, sloths and jaguars. Sloths are typically found in Venezuela's tropical rainforests, crab-eating foxes live in the vast southern region, while giant anteaters can be found in different habitats across the country. Capybaras are also somewhat versatile, and prefer living near water.

=== Mammals of the Western Llanos ===
A study of small mammals within agricultural areas of Venezuela's Western Llanos, largely Portuguesa, showed ten rodent species and three marsupial species. Most of the different habitats across this area showed a large prevalence of the rodents Sigmodon alstoni and Zygodontomys brevicauda, which appear to dominate the region. However, areas of subsistence agriculture showed much more diversity and greater equal weighting of the inhabitant species. Some of the rodent species may be seen as pests because of their destruction of crops and for transferal of disease to humans in such rural areas of South America; both the most prevalent rodents are carriers of particularly endemic diseases.

=== Mammals of the Maracaibo Basin ===
The Maracaibo Basin spans northwestern Venezuela. There are two species of mammals that are both endemic to and characteristic of this region, and to similar dry forests in Colombia and Venezuela; the Guajira mouse opossum and Hummelinck's vesper mouse.

== Importance ==
The use of wildlife products is widespread in Venezuela, and more than 400 species are known to be used as a source of protein (subsistence hunting) or for trade in domestic and international markets.

== Conservation ==
Habitat destruction, pollution, introduction of exotic species and overexploitation are the main threats to Venezuelan wildlife.

An examination of the fauna of Venezuela as spread throughout the country led a review to establish that conservation efforts should focus both on the natural areas north of the Orinoco and on the open nature reserves occupying the south.

Human intervention, particularly oil work, in the Maracaibo Basin threatens the species there, and has changed the ecology of the region significantly since the 19th century.

== See also ==
- Flora of Venezuela
