= South-Western Region, Venezuela =

Administrative region of Venezuela

The South-Western Region is one of the 10 administrative regions in which Venezuela is divided for development planning; it comprises the state of Táchira and the Páez Municipality of Apure State.
