= Flora of Venezuela =

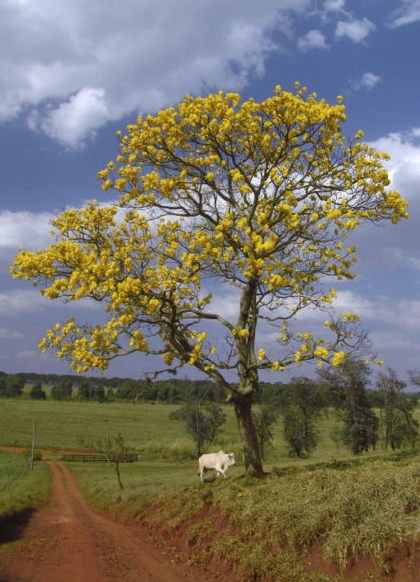
The araguaney (Tabebuia chrysantha), Venezuela's national tree.

The flora of Venezuela consists of a huge variety of unique plants; around 38% of the estimated 30,000 species of plants found in the country are endemic to Venezuela. Overall, around 48% of Venezuela's land is forested; this includes over 60% of the Venezuelan Amazon. These rainforests are increasingly endangered by mining and logging activities.

Venezuela has a variety of biomes, including the Andes mountains in the west and the Amazon Basin rainforest in the south. Centrally located are the extensive Llanos lowland plains that host savannah forest. Also present is the Caribbean coast in the middle of the north, and the Orinoco River Delta in the east. They include xeric scrublands in the extreme northwest and coastal mangrove forests in the northeast. Its cloud forests and lowland rainforests are particularly rich, for example hosting over 25,000 species of orchids. These include the flor de mayo orchid (Cattleya mossiae), the national flower. Venezuela's national tree is the araguaney, whose characteristic lushness after the rainy season led novelist Rómulo Gallegos to name it «[l]a primavera de oro de los araguaneyes» ("the golden spring of the araguaneyes").

== Human Usage ==
Plants are used in industries such as agriculture and forestry. Forestry in Venezuela utilizes trees such as ceder and mahogany.

Some plants are valued by Venezuelans for medical use. These plants are most often utilized through being cooked and eaten.
