= List of government-owned companies =

This is a non-exhaustive world-wide list of government-owned companies. A government-owned corporation (GOCs) is a legal entity that undertakes commercial activities on behalf of an owner government. Their legal status varies from being a part of government to stock companies with a state as a regular stockholder. The defining characteristics are that they have a distinct legal form and that they are established to operate in commercial affairs. While they may also have public policy objectives, GOCs should be differentiated from other forms of government agencies or state entities established to pursue purely non-financial objectives.

== Afghanistan ==
In 2009, the Government of the Islamic Republic of Afghanistan formed the Afghan Public Protection Force (APPF) as a "state owned enterprise" subordinate to the Ministry of the Interior. By presidential decree, the APPF is mandated to replace all non-diplomatic private security companies by 20 March 2013 to become the sole provider of pay-for-service security contracts within Afghanistan.

== Albania ==
- Air Albania (51%; 49% Turkish Airlines)
- Albgaz
- KESH
- OSHEE
- Posta Shqiptare

== Algeria ==
- Air Algérie
- Anesrif
- Agence algérienne pour le rayonnement culturel
- Agence nationale des autoroutes
- Agence nationale pour la promotion et la rationalisation de l'utilisation de l'énergie
- Algérie Télécom
- Algérie Poste
- Entreprise Métro d’Alger
- Entreprise de transport algérien par câbles
- Entreprise de transport urbain et suburbain d'Alger
- Groupe Cosider
- TRANSTEV
- GCB (entreprise)
- Mobilis
- Naftal
- Office national algérien du tourisme
- Public Establishment of Television (ENTV)
- Radio Algeria (ENRS)
- Sonatrach
- Sonelgaz
- (SNVI) Société nationale des véhicules industriels
- Société nationale de sidérurgie
- Société algérienne des ponts et travaux d'arts
- Société d'exploitation des tramways
- Société d’Exploitation des Gares Routières d’Algérie
- Tassili Airlines

== Argentina ==
- Administración de Infraestructura Ferroviaria
- Aerolíneas Argentinas
- Aguas y Saneamientos Argentinos
- Astilleros DOMECQ GARCÍA
- Astilleros TANDANOR
- Austral Líneas Aéreas - Cielos del Sur
- Banco de Inversiones y Comercio Exterior
- Banco de la Nación Argentina
- Banco Hipotecario
- Casa de la Moneda
- Combustibles Nucleares Argentinos CONUARSA
- Compañía Nacional del Mercado Mayorista de Electricidad CAMMESA
- Construcción de Viviendas de la Armada COVIARA
- Contenidos Públicos
- Corporación del Mercado Central de Buenos Aires
- Corporación Interestadual Pulmarí
- Corporación Puerto Madero
- Corredores Argentinos
- Correo Argentino
- Dioxitek S.A.
- Educ.ar
- Emprendimientos Energéticos Binacionales
- Empresa Argentina de Navegación Aérea
- Empresa de Cargas Aéreas del Atlántico Sud
- Empresa Neuquina de Ingeniería Nuclear
- Energía Argentina S.A ENARSA
- Fábrica Argentina de Aviones
- Fabricaciones Militares
- Ferrocarriles Argentinos
- Fondo de Capital Social S.E
- INTERCARGO S.A.C
- INTESA
- Investigaciones Aplicadas INVAP S.E
- Líneas Aéreas del Estado LADE
- Nucleoeléctrica Argentina
- Operadora Ferroviaria
- Polo Tecnológico Constituyentes
- Radio de la Universidad Nacional del Litoral
- Radio y Televisión Argentina
- Radio y Televisión de la Universidad Nacional de Córdoba
- Soluciones Satelitales Argentinas ARSAT
- Télam
- Yacimientos de Agua de Dionisio
- Yacimientos Carboniferos Río Turbio
- YPF
- YPF GAS
- YPF Tecnología

== Armenia ==
- Armenian Nuclear Power Plant CJSC
- Yerevan Thermal Power Plant CJSC
- High Voltage Electric Networks CJSC
- Electrical Power System Operator CJSC
- Yerevan Water Supply Route OJSC
- Special Mountain Rescue Service CJSC

== Australia ==
- Defence Housing Australia
- Australian Rail Track Corporation
- Snowy Hydro
- Red Energy
- Australian Submarine Corporation
- Australian Broadcasting Corporation
- Special Broadcasting Service
- NBN Co
- Western Sydney Airport
- Clean Energy Finance Corporation
- Australia Post
- Tourism Tasmania

== Austria ==
- ÖBB (national railway system of Austria, administrator of Liechtenstein's railways)
- ASFINAG (Autobahn and highway financing, building, maintaining and administration)
- Hypo Alpe-Adria-Bank International: Austria nationalised this bank in 2009, and in 2014 its then-Chancellor feared its insolvency might have a similar effect to the Creditanstalt event of 1931.
- Verbund 51% SOE (electricity generator and provider)
- Volksbank 43.3% SOE (retail banking group, with additional operations in Hungary, Romania and Malta)
- ORF: funded from television licence fee revenue, dominant player in the Austrian broadcast media
- Österreichische Industrieholding (ÖIAG): Austrian industry-holding stock corporation for partially or entirely nationalized companies, as of 2005:
  - 31.50% of the oil producer OMV: an integrated international oil and gas company
  - 28.42% of Telekom Austria: fixed line, mobile, data, and Internet communications services
  - 52.85% of Austrian Post: postal service
  - 100% of ÖIAG-Bergbauholding
  - 100% of Finanzmarkt Beteiligungs AG (FIMBAG)
- Oesterreichische Nationalbank (central bank of Austria)

== Azerbaijan ==
- Azerbaijani Airlines
- Azerenerji
- Azərpoçt
- Azerbaijan Railways
- Azerbaijan Caspian Shipping Company
- Baku Metro
- SOCAR
- AzTV
- Medeniyyet TV
- Idman Azerbaijan TV

== Bangladesh ==
- Bangladesh Petroleum Corporation
- Bangladesh Submarine Cable Company Limited
- Bangladesh Telecommunications Company Limited
- Gas Transmission Company Limited
- Karnaphuli Paper Mills
- Petrobangla
- Biman Bangladesh Airlines
- Bangladesh Bank
- Bangladesh Jute Mills Corporation
- Bangladesh Parjatan Corporation
- Bangladesh Ordnance Factory
- Bangladesh Steel and Engineering Corporation
- Bangladesh Shipping Corporation
- Bangladesh Television
- Bangladesh Betar
- BCIC
- North-West Power Generation Company Limited
- Ashuganj Power Station Company Limited
- Electricity Generation Company Bangladesh Limited
- West Zone Power Distribution Company Limited
- Dhaka Power Distribution Company

== Belgium ==
- Belfius (100%)
- Belgischer Rundfunk
- Bpost
- Brussels Airport (25%)
- Elia System Operator (5.37%)
- Ethias (25%)
- Federale Participatie- en Investeringsmaatschappij-Federale Participatie- en Investeringsmaatschappij (SFPI-FPIM)
- Fluxys (2.1%)
- Infrabel
- National Railway Company of Belgium
- National Bank of Belgium (50%)
- Proximus (53.3%)
- RTBF
- Vlaamse Radio- en Televisieomroeporganisatie

The Region of Wallonia owns:

- Brussels South Charleroi Airport
- Liège Airport

== Belize ==
- National Bank of Belize

== Bolivia ==
- Agencia Boliviana Espacial
- Corporación Minera de Bolivia and subsidiaries
- Corporación de las Fuerzas Armadas para el Desarrollo Nacional and most subsidiaries
- Empresa Boliviana de Alimentos y Derivados
- Empresa Boliviana de Industrialización de Hidrocarburos
- Empresa de Apoyo a la Producción de Alimentos
- Empresa Estatal de Televisión Bolivia TV
- Empresa Estratégica Boliviana de Construcción y Conservación de Infraestructura Civil
- Empresa Estratégica de Producción de Abonos y Fertilizantes
- Empresa Estratégica de Producción de Semillas
- Empresa Nacional de Electricidad (central)
- Empresa Pública Nacional Estratégica Boliviana de Aviación
- Empresa Pública Nacional Estratégica Depositos Aduaneros Bolivianos
- Empresa Pública Nacional Estratégica Yacimientos de Litio Bolivianos
- Empresa Pública Productiva Cartones de Bolivia
- Empresa Pública Productiva Cementos de Bolivia
- Empresa Pública Productiva Envases de Vidrio de Bolivia
- Empresa Pública Productiva Papeles de Bolivia
- Transportes Aéreos Bolivianos
- Yacimientos Petroliferos Fiscales Bolivianos

== Brazil ==
State-owned enterprises are divided into public enterprises (empresa pública) and mixed-economy companies (sociedade de economia mista). The public enterprises are subdivided into two categories: individual – with its own assets and capital owned by the Union – and plural companies – whose assets are owned by multiple government agencies and the Union, which have the majority of the voting interest. Caixa Econômica Federal, Correios, Embrapa and BNDES and are examples of public enterprises. Mixed-economy companies are enterprises with the majority of stocks owned by the government, but that also have stocks owned by the private sector and usually have their shares traded on stock exchanges. Banco do Brasil, Petrobras, Sabesp, and Eletrobras are examples of mixed-economy companies.

Beginning in the 1990s, the central government of Brazil launched a privatization program inspired by the Washington Consensus. State-owned enterprises such as Vale do Rio Doce, Telebrás, CSN, and Usiminas (most of them mixed-economy companies) were transferred to the private sector as part of this policy.

Brazil State Owned Companies Fact Sheet / Download from the planejamento.gov.br website.

== Brunei ==
- Brunei Investment Agency
- Radio Television Brunei

== Bulgaria ==
- Bulgarian Energy Holding
- State Enterprise "Radioactive Waste" (DP RAO)
- Bulgarian Posts
- Bulgarian State Railways
- LB Bulgaricum
- National Railway Infrastructure Company
- Kintex
- Sofia Airport
- Plovdiv Airport
- Port of Varna EАD
- Port Burgas EАD
- Bulgarian Maritime Training Centre
- Bulgarian National Television

== Canada ==
In Canada, state-owned corporations are referred to as Crown corporations, indicating that an organization is established by law, owned by the sovereign (either in right of Canada or a province), and overseen by parliament and cabinet. Examples of federal Crown corporations include:

- the Canadian Broadcasting Corporation
- Canada Post
- Bank of Canada
- Telefilm Canada
- Via Rail

Ministers of the Crown often control the shares in such public corporations, while parliament both sets out the laws that create and bind Crown corporations and sets their annual budgets.

Foreign SOEs are welcome to invest in Canada: in fall 2013, British Columbia and Alberta signed agreements overseas to promote foreign direct investment in Canada. The Investment Canada Act governs this area federally. Former Prime Minister Stephen Harper stated in 2013 that the "government [needs] to exercise its judgement" over SOEs.

Crown corporations of British Columbia include:

- BC Hydro
- BC Transit
- BC Housing Management Commission
- British Columbia Lottery Corporation
- Liquor Distribution Branch

Saskatchewan has maintained the largest number of Crown corporations, including:

- Saskatchewan Government Insurance
- SaskEnergy
- SaskPower
- SaskTel
- SaskWater

In Ontario:

- GroupeMédia TFO
- Independent Electricity System Operator
- Ontario Educational Communications Authority
- Ontario Lottery and Gaming Corporation
- Ontario Power Generation
- Liquor Control Board of Ontario

In Quebec:

- Caisse de dépôt et placement du Québec
- Hydro-Québec
- Investissement Québec
- Loto-Québec
- Société de la Place des Arts de Montréal
- Société des alcools du Québec
- Société des Traversiers du Québec
- Société Québécoise des Infrastructures
- Télé-Québec

Privatization, or the selling of Crown corporations to private interests, has become common throughout Canada over the past 30 years. Petro-Canada, Canadian National Railway, and Air Canada are examples of former federal Crown corporations that have been privatized. Privatized provincial Crown corporations include Alberta Government Telephones (which merged with privately owned BC Tel to form Telus), BCRIC, Manitoba Telecom Services, Saskatchewan Oil & Gas Corporation and Potash Corporation of Saskatchewan.

== Chile ==
- ASMAR
- BancoEstado
- Casa de Moneda de Chile
- Cimm (Centro de Investigación Minera y Metalúrgica)
- Cimm Tecnologías y Servicios S.A.
- Comercializadora de Trigo S.A.
- Codelco (Corporación Nacional del Cobre de Chile)
- Econssa Chile S.A.
- CorreosChile
- EFE
- Empresa de Servicios Sanitarios Lago Peñuelas S.A.
- Metro S.A.
- ENAER
- ENAMI (Empresa Nacional de Minería)
- Empresa Nacional del Petróleo
- Empresa Portuaria Antofagasta
- Empresa Portuaria Arica
- Empresa Portuaria Austral
- Empresa Portuaria Chacabuco
- Empresa Portuaria Coquimbo
- Empresa Portuaria Iquique
- Empresa Portuaria Puerto Montt
- Empresa Portuaria San Antonio
- Empresa Portuaria Talcahuano San Vicente
- Empresa Portuaria Valparaíso
- FAMAE
- Polla Chilena de Beneficencia S.A.
- Puerto Madero Impresores S.A.
- Sociedad Agrícola Sacor Ltda.
- Sasipa (Sociedad Agrícola y Servicios Isla de Pascua Ltda.)
- Televisión Nacional de Chile
- Zofri

== China ==
After 1949, all business entities in the People's Republic of China were created and owned by the government. In the late 1980s, the government began to reform the state-owned enterprise, and during the 1990s and 2000s, many mid-sized and small sized state-owned enterprises were privatized and went public. There are a number of different corporate forms which result in a mixture of public and private capital. In PRC terminology, a state-owned enterprise refers to a particular corporate form, which is increasingly being replaced by the listed company. Some of the largest state-owned enterprises have been floated on the Shanghai Stock Exchange and the Shenzhen Stock Exchange, but in actuality, the state maintains total control of these corporations, always holding majority interest and voting rights. State-owned enterprises are mostly governed by both local governments' SASAC and, in the central government, the State-owned Assets Supervision and Administration Commission (SASAC) of the State Council. However, some state-owned enterprise were governed by China Investment Corporation (and its domestic arm Central Huijin Investment), as well as under the governance of Ministry of Education for the university-run enterprises, or some financial institutes that were under the governance of the Ministry of Finance.

As of 2011, 35% of business activity and 43% of profits in the People's Republic of China resulted from companies in which the state owned a majority interest. Critics, such as The New York Times, have alleged that China's state-owned companies are a vehicle for corruption by the families of ruling party leaders who have sometimes amassed fortunes while managing them.

As of October 2019 China had more than 350 individual entries in the Government-owned companies of China category page.

=== Hong Kong ===
In the postwar years, Hong Kong's colonial government operated under a laissez-faire economic philosophy called positive non-interventionism. Hence Crown corporations did not play as significant a role in the development of the territory as in many other British territories.

The MTR Corporation (MTR) was formed as a Crown corporation, mandated to operate under "prudent commercial principles", in 1975. The Kowloon-Canton Railway, operated under a government department, was corporatised in 1982 to imitate the success of MTR (see Kowloon-Canton Railway Corporation). MTR was privatised in 2000 although the Hong Kong Government is still the majority shareholder. KCR was operationally merged with MTR in 2007.

Examples of present-day statutory bodies include the Airport Authority, responsible for running the Hong Kong International Airport, or the Housing Authority, which provides housing to about half of Hong Kong residents.

== Colombia ==
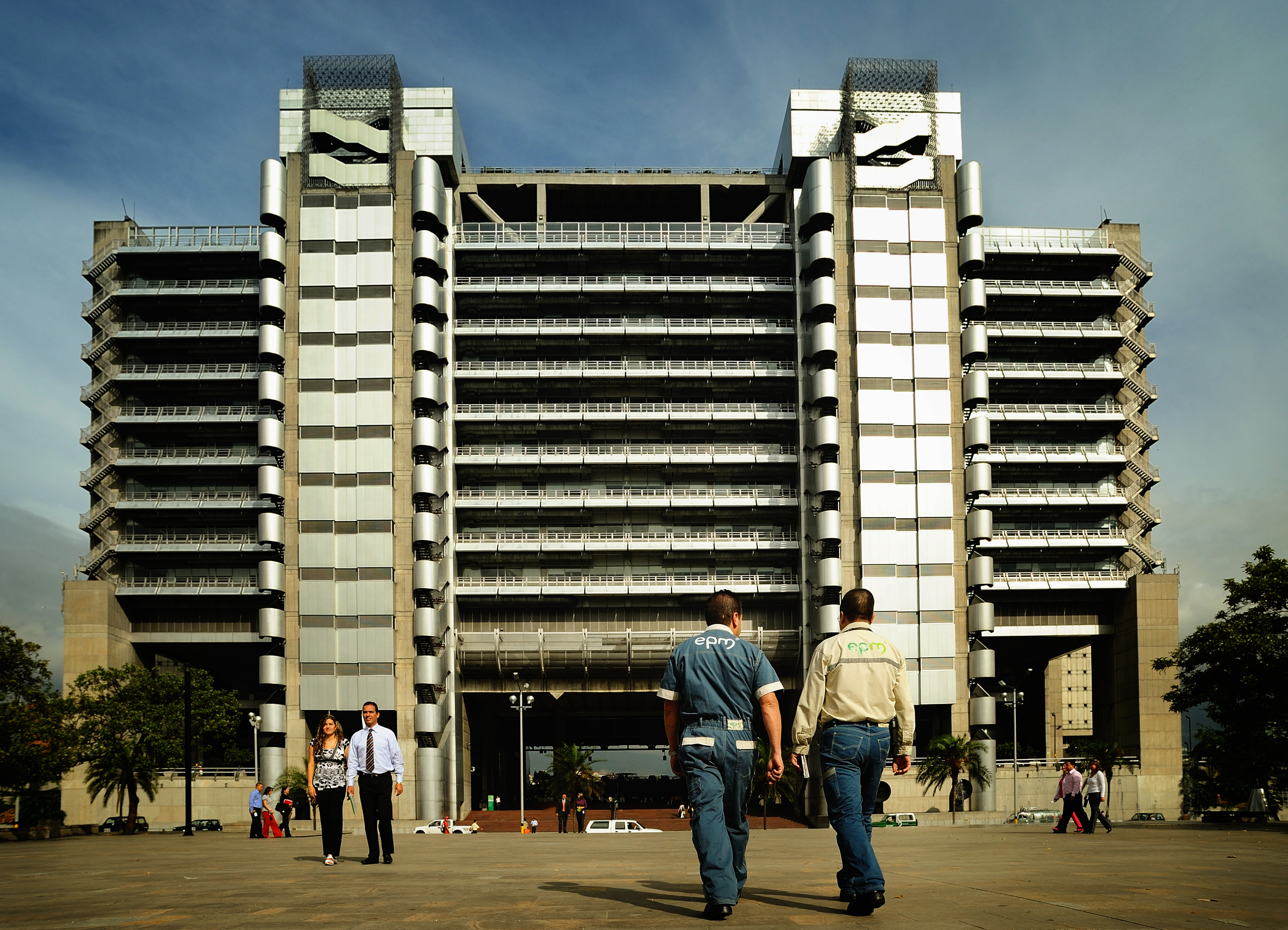
Empresas Públicas de Medellín headquarters

- Ecopetrol
- Empresas Públicas de Medellín
- ETB
- Las Ceibas - Empresas Públicas de Neiva E.S.P
- INDUMIL
- COTECMAR
- RTVC Sistema de Medios Públicos

== Cuba ==
- Empresa de Telecomunicaciones de Cuba S.A.
- Union de Industrias Militares
- Cuban Institute of Radio and Television
- Central Bank of Cuba

== Czech Republic ==
- Budweiser Budvar Brewery
- ČEPS, a.s.
- ČEZ Group
- České dráhy
- Czech Radio
- Czech Television

== Denmark ==
- Banedanmark
- Danske Spil
- DR
- DSB
- Energinet.dk
- Ørsted (50.1%)
- PostNord Danmark

Municipal

- Aarhus Vand A/S
- Kalundborg Forsyning A/S
- Middelgrunden offshore electricity generation wind farm
- Samsø offshore electricity generation wind farm and district heating plants
- Vandcenter Syd as

== East Timor ==
- Bee Timor Leste
- Eletricidade de Timor-Leste
- Hotel Timor
- Radio-Televisão Timor Leste
- Tatoli
- Timor GAP
- Timor Telecom

== Ecuador ==
- Ecuadorian Naval Shipyards ASTINAVE EP
- Banking for Rural and Urban Productive Development BANECUADOR BP
- Development Bank of Ecuador BDE
- Pacific Bank BDP (currently on sale)
- Electricity Corporation of Ecuador CELEC EP
- National Electricity Corporation CNEL EP
- National Telecommunications Corporation CNT EP (currently on sale)
- Ecuadorian Railways (defunct)
- Post Office of Ecuador CDE
- EMELNORTE SA
- Regional Electric Company Ambato Centro Norte SA EEASA
- Electric Company Azogues CA EEA
- Electric Company CENTROSUR
- Electric Company Provincial Cotopaxi SA EEPC
- Galápagos Provincial Electric Company EEPG
- Quito Electric Company EEQ
- Southern Regional Electric Company SA EERSSA
- Riobamba Electric Company SA EERSA
- National Mining Company ENAMI
- Public Water Company EPA
- Public Media EPMPCE (many medias are behind this entity such as TC Television, Gamavision, Ecuadorian Public Radio and Ecuador TV)
- Ecuadorian Petroleum Fleet Public Company FLOPEC
- PETROECUADOR EP
- Ecuador Airline TAME EP (defunct)
- PETROAMAZONAS EP
- Santa Barbara EP SBEP
- Ecuadorian Shipping Transport TRANSNAVE
- Storage Unit UAE

== Egypt ==
=== Transportation ===
- Egyptian Holding Company for Airports and Air Navigation (EHCAAN)
- EgyptAir
- Egyptian National Railways (ENR)
- Suez Canal Authority
- Alexandria Shipyard
- Superjet Lines

=== Media & Communication ===
- Egypt Post
- National Media Authority (former ERTU)
  - Egyptian Media Production City Co SAE
  - Sono Cairo
  - Egyptian Satellites Co SAE (Nilesat)
  - Nile Radio Network
  - Nile Television Network
- Telecom Egypt

=== Petroleum, Chemicals & Mining ===
- Egyptian General Petroleum Corporation (EGPC)
- Egyptian Natural Gas Holding Company (EGAS)
  - Egyptian Natural Gas Company (GASCO)
- South Valley Egyptian Petroleum Holding Company
- Egyptian Petrochemicals Holding Co (ECHEM)
- Holding Company for Chemical Industries

=== Contracting & Real Estate ===
- New Urban Communities Authority (NUCA)
- Holding Company for Construction and Development (HCCD)
- Arab Contractors

=== Banking & Insurance ===
- National Bank of Egypt
- Banque Misr
- Banque du Caire
- Alexbank
- Housing and Development Bank
- Misr Insurance Company

=== Pharmaceuticals ===
- Holding Company for Pharmaceuticals (Holdipharma)
- Egyptian Holding Company for Biological Products and Vaccines (Vacsera)

=== Manufacturing & Retail ===
- Holding Company for Cotton, Spinning, Weaving and Garments
  - Misr Spinning and Weaving Company
- Metallurgical Industries Holding
  - El Nasr Automotive Manufacturing Company
  - Egyptalum
- Omar Effendi

=== Utilities ===
- Egyptian Electricity Holding Company (EEHC)
- Holding Company for Water and Wastewater (HCWW)
- Egypt Gas

=== Tourism ===
Holding Company for Tourism and Hotels (HOTAC)

== Finland ==
- Alko
- Altia
- CSC – IT Center for Science
- Destia
- Hansel Ltd.
- Laatumaa
- Metsähallitus
- National Land Survey of Finland
- Omaisuudenhoitoyhtiö Arsenal
- Patria
- Senate Properties
- Veikkaus
- VR Group
- Yle

== Gabon ==
- Société Nationale Petrolière Gabonaise

== Ghana ==
- Ghana National Petroleum Corporation
- Ghana Oil Company
- Volta River Authority
- Electricity Company of Ghana
- Cocoa Processing Company Limited
- Ghana Water Company Limited

== Greenland ==
- Greenland Airport Authority

== Hungary ==
- Hungarian State Railways
- Kossuth Rádió
- Magyar Posta
- Magyar Rádió
- Magyar Televízió
- MVM Group
- Paks Nuclear Power Plant
- State Printing Company

== India ==
In India, state-owned enterprise is termed a Public Sector Undertaking (PSU) or a Central Public Sector Enterprise (CPSE). These companies are owned by the Union Government, or one of the many state or territorial governments, or both. The company equity needs to be majority owned by the government to be a PSU. Below are some Examples.

- Life Insurance Corporation of India
- Oil and Natural Gas Corporation
- Engineers India Limited
- India Trade Promotion Organization
- GAIL
- Indian Oil Corporation Limited
- Power Grid Corporation of India Limited
- BSNL
- Food Corporation of India
- Bharat Heavy Electricals Limited (BHEL)

== Iran ==
- Iran Air
- National Iranian Oil Company
- National Iranian Gas Company
- National Iranian Petrochemical Company
- National Iranian Oil Refining and Distribution Company
- Islamic Republic of Iran Broadcasting

== Iraq ==
- General Company for Ports of Iraq
- Iraq National Oil Company
- Iraqi Airways
- Iraqi Post
- Iraqi Republic Railways
- Iraqi Telecommunications and Post Company
- Defence Industries Commission

== Ireland ==
- Bank of Ireland (15%)

== Israel ==
- Amidar
- Israel Aerospace Industries
- Israel Aerospace Industries Tamam Division
- Israel Airports Authority
- Israel Broadcasting Authority (including Israel Radio)
- Israeli Public Broadcasting Corporation
- Israel Electric Corporation
- Israel Port Authority
- Israel Postal Company
- Israel Railways
- Mekorot
- National Roads Company of Israel
- Rafael Advanced Defense Systems

== Italy ==
Companies owned by the Ministry of Economy and Finances:

- Alitalia - Linee Aeree Italiane S.p.A. in a.s. (49,90%)
- ANAS S.p.A. (100%)
- ARCUS S.p.A. (100%)
- Cassa Depositi e Prestiti S.p.A. (70%)
  - Fintecna S.p.A. (100%)
  - CDP Reti
- Cinecittà Luce S.p.A. (100%)
- Coni Servizi S.p.A. (100%)
- Consap S.p.A. (100%)
- Consip S.p.A. (100%)
- Expo 2015 S.p.A. (40%)
- ENAV S.p.A. (100%)
- Enel S.p.A. (31,24%)
- Eni S.p.A. (3,93%) (Cassa Depositi e Prestiti S.p.A. holds 26,40%)
- Leonardo S.p.A. (30,20%)
- Invitalia S.p.A. (100%)
- EUR S.p.A. (90%)
- Ferrovie dello Stato Italiane S.p.A. (100%)
- Fondo Italiano d'Investimento SGR S.p.A. (12,50%)
- GSE S.p.A. (100%)
- Istituto Poligrafico e Zecca dello Stato S.p.A. (100%)
- Italia Lavoro S.p.A. (100%)
- Poste Italiane S.p.A. (64.696%)
- Rai Radiotelevisione Italiana S.p.A. (99,56%)
- Rete Autostrade Mediterranee S.p.A. (100%)
- SACE S.p.A. (100%)
- Sicot S.r.l. (100%)
- Società per lo Sviluppo del Mercato dei Fondi Pensione S.p.A. (56,01%)
- SOGEI S.p.A. (100%)
- SOGESID S.p.A. (100%)
- SOGIN S.p.A. (100%)
- STMicroelectronics Holding N.V. (50%)
- Studiare Sviluppo S.r.l. (100%)

== Japan ==
State-owned enterprises in Japan are commonly divided into tokushu hōjin (ja:特殊法人; lit. "special legal person") and tokushu gaisha (ja:特殊会社; lit. "special company"). Tokushu hōjin are the Japanese equivalent to statutory corporations; tokushu gaisha are kabushiki gaisha owned wholly or majorly by the government.

Japan Post was reorganized into Japan Post Group in 2007 as a material step of the Japanese postal service privatization. It ceased to be wholly owned by the government on November 4, 2015 when the government listed 11% of its holdings on the Tokyo Stock Exchange. Parts of the Japan Railways Group (JR) were formerly owned by the government. J-Power was also state-owned before being privatized.

=== Tokushu hōjin ===
- NHK
- Japan Racing Association
- Japan Pension Service
- Okinawa Development Finance Corporation
- Promotion and Mutual Service Corporation for Private Schools of Japan

=== Tokushu gaisha ===
- Japan Railways Group
  - Hokkaido Railway Company
  - Shikoku Railway Company
  - Japan Freight Railway Company
- Expressways of Japan
  - East Nippon Expressway Company Limited (100%)
  - Central Nippon Expressway Company Limited (100%)
  - West Nippon Expressway Company Limited (100%)
  - Metropolitan Expressway Company Limited (49.99%)
  - Hanshin Expressway Company Limited (50%)
  - Honshu-Shikoku Bridge Expressway Company Limited (JB Honshi Kōsoku) (66.63%)
- Japan Alcohol (J.alco) (33.3%; the rest are owned by Japan Alcohol Trading Company/Nihon Alcohol Hanbai KK, a private company)
- Narita International Airport Corporation (MLIT 90.01%, MOF 9.99%)
- Nippon Automated Cargo Clearance Systems (NACCS) (50.01%)
- Tokyo Metro Company, Limited (26.71% owned by the central government; 23.29% owned by the Tokyo Metropolitan Government)
- The government is mandated by law to own one-thirds of all Nippon Telegraph and Telephone, Japan Tobacco, and Japan Post Holdings Company stocks
- Owned by JOGMEC:
  - JAPEX (34%)
  - Inpex (18.96%)

== Kazakhstan ==
- KazMunayGas
- Qazaqstan Radio and Television Corporation

== Kenya ==
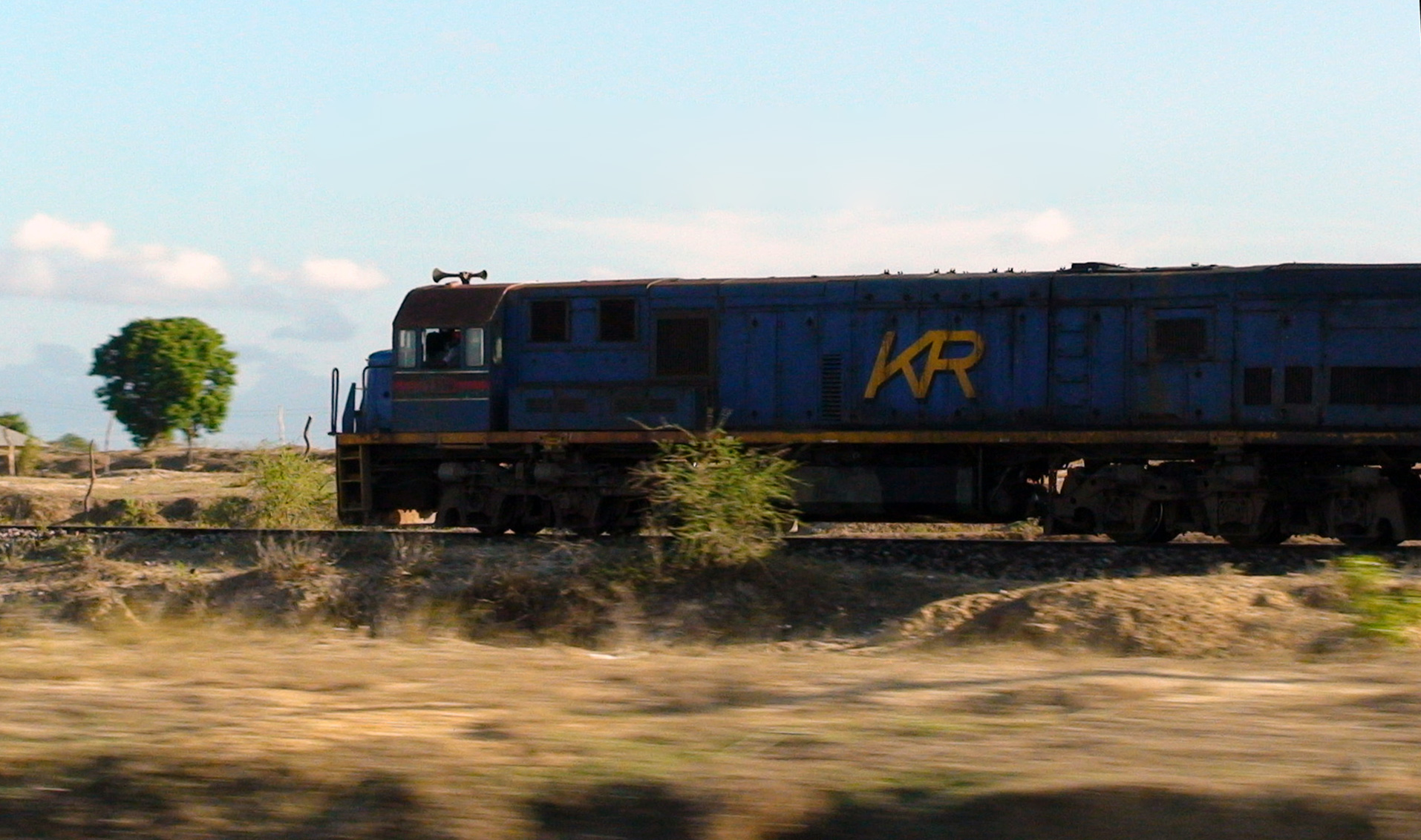
A Kenya Railways GE U26C type locomotive

Parastatals in Kenya, partly from a lack of expertise and endemic corruption, have largely inhibited economic development. In 1979, a presidential commission went as far as saying that they constituted "a serious threat to the economy", and, by 1989, they had still not furthered industrialization or fostered the development of a Black business class.

Several Kenyan SOEs have been privatized since the 1980s, with mixed results.

- Kenya Broadcasting Corporation
- Kenya Electricity Generating Company
- Kenya Pipeline Company
- Kenya Railways Corporation
- National Oil Corporation of Kenya

== Kuwait ==
- Kuwait Petroleum Corporation
- Kuwait Television

== South Korea ==
There are many state-owned enterprises in South Korea.

- Educational Broadcasting System
- Incheon International Airport
- Korail
- Korea Electric Power Corporation
- Korea Land and Housing Corporation
- Korea National Oil Corporation
- Korean Broadcasting System
- Seoul Metro
- Seoul Metropolitan Rapid Transit Corporation

== Latvia ==
- VAS Latvijas Pasts - 100% owned by the Ministry of Transport
- AS Latvian State Forests (Latvijas Valsts meži) - 100% owned by the Ministry of Agriculture
- VAS Latvian Railways (Latvijas dzelzceļš) - 100% owned by the Ministry of Transport
- AS Latvenergo - 100% owned by the Ministry of Economics
- VSIA Latvian Television
- VSIA Latvian Radio
- AS Air Baltic Corporation - 80.05% owned by the Ministry of Transport
- VSIA Latvian National Opera and Ballet
- VSIA Pauls Stradiņš Clinical University Hospital
- VSIA Latvian National Theatre
- VSIA Latvijas Vēstnesis - 100% owned by the Ministry of Justice
- VSIA Latvian Environment, Geology and Meteorology Centre

== Libya ==
- Libyan Jamahiriya Broadcasting Corporation
- National Oil Corporation

== Lithuania ==
- Lietuvos paštas
- Lithuanian Mint
- Lithuanian National Radio and Television
- Lithuanian Railways

== Luxembourg ==
- Banque et Caisse d'Épargne de l'État
- Central Bank of Luxembourg
- Centre Hospitalier de Luxembourg
- Luxair
- Post Luxembourg
- Société Nationale de Crédit et d'Investissement
- Société Nationale des Chemins de Fer Luxembourgeois

== Madagascar ==
- Air Madagascar
- Jirama
- Télévision Malagasy

== Malaysia ==
- 1Malaysia Development Berhad (1MDB)
- Agro Bank Malaysia
- Bank Simpanan Nasional (BSN)
- Indah Water Konsortium (IWK)
- Keretapi Tanah Melayu (KTM)
- Khazanah Nasional
- Malaysia Airlines Berhad (MAB)
- Malaysia Rail Link Sdn Bhd (MRL)
- Mass Rapid Transit Corporation (MRTC)
- Petroliam Nasional Berhad (PETRONAS)
- Pos Malaysia
- Prasarana Malaysia
- Radio Televisyen Malaysia (RTM)
- Sabah Electricity
- TV Sarawak (TVS)
- SIRIM Berhad
- Telekom Malaysia (TM)
- Tenaga Nasional Berhad (TNB)

== Mauritius ==
- Mauritius Broadcasting Corporation

== Mexico ==
- Aeropuertos y Servicios Auxiliares
- Comisión Federal de Electricidad
- Tren Interoceánico
- Pemex
- Ferrocarriles Chiapas-Mayab
- Sistema Público de Radiodifusión del Estado Mexicano
- Aerolínea del Estado Mexicano

== Namibia ==
- Bank of Namibia
- NamWater
- Otavi Mining and Railway Company
- TransNamib
- Namibian Broadcasting Corporation

== Netherlands ==
- De Nederlandsche Bank
- FMO
- ABN AMRO
- Gasunie
- Holland Casino
- Nederlandse Spoorwegen
- NS Railinfratrust
- Royal Dutch Mint
- SNS Reaal
- TenneT
- Nederlandse Publieke Omroep (organization)
- KLM

== New Zealand ==
New Zealanders commonly refer to their state-owned enterprises as "SOEs", or as "crown entities". Local government councils and similar authorities also set up locally controlled enterprises, such as water-supply companies and "local-authority trading enterprises" (LATEs) as separate corporations or as business units of the councils concerned.

Government-owned businesses designated as crown entities include:

- Television New Zealand
- Radio New Zealand
- Crown Research Institutes

New Zealand's state-owned enterprises have included:

- New Zealand Post
  - Kiwibank
- Meteorological Service of New Zealand Limited
- Airways New Zealand
- Transpower New Zealand Limited
- Landcorp
- Kordia
  - Orcon Internet Limited (2007-2013)
- Mercury Energy
- Meridian Energy
- Genesis Energy Limited
- Learning Media Limited
- Solid Energy

State-owned enterprises which have undergone privatisation and subsequent renationalisation:

- New Zealand Railways Corporation
  - KiwiRail
- Air New Zealand
- Quotable Value (QV - partially privatised)

== Nigeria ==
- Garden City Radio 89.9
- Nigeria Social Insurance Trust Fund
- Nigerian Coal Corporation
- Nigerian National Petroleum Corporation
- Power Holding Company of Nigerianow privatize
- Nigeria Ports Authority
- Nigeria Broadcasting Corporation
- Nigeria Railway Corporation
- Nigeria Television Authority(NTA)
- National Aviation Handling Company(NACHO)

== Oman ==
- Oman Air
- OQ (company)

== Pakistan ==
Pakistan has a large list of government owned companies called State owned entities (SOEs). These played an important role in the development of the business and industry in Pakistan, but recently they are considered responsible for fiscal difficulties of the government due to corruption and bad governance. These SOEs, roughly 190 in number, operate in a wide range of economic areas including energy, communication, transport, shipping, trading, and banking & finance. Some of the most common examples of crown companies in Pakistan are Pakistan State Oil, Sui Northern Gas Pipelines, Pakistan International Airlines, and Pakistan Steel Mills.

== Panama ==
- Panama Canal

== Philippines ==
In the Philippines, state-owned enterprises are known as government-owned and controlled corporations (GOCCs). They can range from the Social Security System (SSS) and the Philippine Coconut Authority with no counterparts in the private sector, to Land Bank of the Philippines, a wholly government-owned bank that competes with private banks.

A number of GOCCs, especially those that were nationalized by Ferdinand Marcos during his time as the President of the Fourth Republic of the Philippines, were returned to the private sector by the end of the 20th and the beginning of the 21st century, as with Philippine Airlines (PAL), Philippine Long Distance Telephone Company (PLDT), Philippine National Bank (PNB), and ABS-CBN Corporation (where the frequencies and facilities used by Banahaw Broadcasting Corporation (BBC) were returned to ABS-CBN in 1986 and the ABS-CBN Broadcasting Center were fully recovered by ABS-CBN from People's Television Network (PTV) in 1992), or fully or partially privatized as with National Power Corporation (NAPOCOR), National Transmission Corporation (TransCo), and Philippine National Construction Corporation (PNCC).

== Poland ==
- Grupa Lotos
- Huta Stalowa Wola
- KGHM Polska Miedź
- LOT Polish Airlines
- Nofer Institute of Occupational Medicine
- PGNiG
- PKN Orlen
- PKO Bank Polski
- PKP Group
- Polska Grupa Energetyczna
- Powszechny Zakład Ubezpieczeń
- Przedsiębiorstwo Komunikacji Samochodowej
- Tauron Group
- Warsaw Stock Exchange
- Zakłady Azotowe Kędzierzyn
- Zakłady Azotowe Puławy
- Telewizja Polska

== Portugal ==
- Águas de Portugal: (100%) water supplier and wastewater sanitation manager
- IP: (100%) construction and management of railway and road infrastructure
- CP: (100%) rail transport operator
- NAV Portugal: (100%) air navigation service provider
- idD Portugal Defence: (100%) state-owned holding, specialized in defense and development of technological systems
- RTP: (100%) public service broadcasting
- INCM: (100%) national mint and print office
- Transtejo & Soflusa: (100%) ferry operator in the city of Lisbon
- Metropolitano de Lisboa: (100%) rapid transit system in the city of Lisbon
- Metro do Porto: light rail transit system in the city of Porto
- Metro Mondego: (100%) bus rapid transit system in the city of Coimbra
- BPF: (100%) investment financial institution
- CGD: (100%) finance institution and banking corporation
- TAP Portugal: (100%) flag carrier airline

== Romania ==
- Căile Ferate Române
- Compania Nationala a Uraniului S.A. (100%)
- Complexul Energetic Hunedoara S.A. (100%)
- Complexul Energetic Oltenia S.A. (77.15%)
- Conpet S.A. (58.72%)
- Hidroelectrica (80%)
- Loteria Română
- Metrorex
- National Company "Bucharest Airports" S.A. (Henri Coandă International Airport & Aurel Vlaicu International Airport)
- Nuclearelectrica (82.5%)
- Oil Terminal S.A. (59.62%)
- Poșta Română (75%)
- Romgaz S.A. (70.01%)
- Romsilva
- S.N. de Inchideri Mine Valea Jiului S.A. (100%)
- Societatea de Administrare a Participatiilor in Energie S.A. (100%)
- Societatea Nationala de Radiocomunicatii
- TAROM
- Transelectrica
- Transgaz
- Uzina Termoelectrica Midia S.A. (56.58%)

The state of Romania owns a minority stake in:

- Electrica (48.78%)
- Engie Romania S.A. (37%)
- E.ON Energie Romania S.A. (31.82%)
- E.ON Distributie Romania S.A. (13.51%)
- OMV Petrom S.A. (20.64%)
- Rompetrol Rafinare S.A. (44.7%)
- Telekom Romania (45,99%)
- Romanian Television

== Saudi Arabia ==
The Saudi government owns or has significant stakes in a vast number of companies spanning various industries such as energy, banking, telecommunications, infrastructure, healthcare, and more. There are well over 150 government-owned or partially state-owned companies in Saudi Arabia, reflecting the government's strategic role in the economy. These companies are managed by government agencies, sovereign wealth funds like the Public Investment Fund (PIF), and other state-owned entities.

Some of the most prominent companies owned or controlled by the Saudi government include:

1. Saudi Aramco
2. Saudi Basic Industries Corporation (SABIC)
3. Saudi Telecom Company (STC)
4. Saudi Electric Company
5. Saudi Arabian Mining Company (Ma'aden)
6. Saudi National Bank (SNB)
7. Saudi Arabian Airlines (Saudia)
8. King Faisal Specialist Hospital & Research Centre
9. Public Investment Fund (PIF)
10. Riyadh Air

== Serbia ==
- Air Serbia (51% share)
- Elektroprivreda Srbije
- HIP Petrohemija
- Plovput
- Pošta Srbije
- RB Kolubara
- Serbian Railways
- Srbijagas
- Tanjug
- Telekom Srbija
- Yugoimport SDPR
- Zastava Arms
- Radio Television of Serbia

== Seychelles ==
- Seychelles Marketing Board

== Singapore ==
Government-linked corporations play a substantial role in Singapore's domestic economy. These GLCs are partially or fully owned by a state-owned investment company, Temasek Holdings. As of November 2011, the top six Singapore-listed GLCs accounted for about 17% of total capitalization of the Singapore Exchange (SGX). Notable GLCs include Singapore Airlines, SingTel, ST Engineering, and Mediacorp.

- CapitaLand
- GIC Private Limited
- Mediacorp
- PSA International
- Singapore Airlines
- Singapore Pools
- Singapore Post
- Singapore Power
- SingTel
- SMRT Corporation
- ST Engineering
- Temasek Holdings

== Slovakia ==
- Kremnica Mint
- Radio and Television of Slovakia

== Slovenia ==
Slovenia is an ex-Yugoslavian republic. As such, its economy was largely state-owned prior to dissolution of that federation. The state still owns many enterprises, such as the banks, which in turn own such businesses as supermarkets and newspapers.

- Abanka, third largest bank
- Nova KBM, second largest bank
- Nova Ljubljanska banka, largest bank
- Radiotelevizija Slovenija

== Spain ==
Spain has thousands of public companies owned by the central, regional and local administrations. This is a short list of some of the most relevant at national level:

- ADIF: (100%) construction and management of rail infrastructure
- Renfe Operadora: (100%) rail transport
- ENAIRE: (100%) state-owned holding, specialized in the commercial aviation sector; owner of the air navigation service provider and of 51% of AENA
  - Aena: (51% state-owned, 49% is being privatized): airport management
- Navantia: (100%) shipbuilding
- RTVE (100%) radio and television broadcasting
- Correos: (100%) postal services, courier
- Enagas: (5%) gas transmission network operator
- Indra Sistemas: (25%) technology systems developer
- Red Electrica de España: (20%) transmission network operator
- Loterías y Apuestas del Estado: (100%) lottery
- CaixaBank: (16%) banking
- Airbus 4% (28% total with Germany and France)

== Sweden ==
There are two types. Government-owned companies are legally normal companies but mainly or fully national owned. They are expected to be funded by their sales. A big customer might be the government or a government agency. The other type is government agencies which might also do activities competing with private owned companies. They usually are funded by tax money but can also sell services. The government has tried to avoid having agencies doing commercial activities, by separating out areas that compete with private companies into government-owned companies, for example within road construction. The reason is both to avoid unfair competition, and a wish to have market economy instead of plan economy as much as possible. Based on the tradition of avoiding "ministerial rule", the government has avoided interfering with the business of the companies, and allowed them to go international.

== Switzerland ==
- Eidgenoessische Konstruktionswerkstaette
- Hotel Bellevue Palace
- RUAG
- Skyguide
- Swiss Federal Railways
- Swiss National Bank
- Swiss Post
- Swisscom
- Verkehrsbetriebe Glattal
- Swiss Broadcasting Corporation

== Syria ==
- Commercial Bank of Syria
- Syrian Air
- Syrian Petroleum Company
- Syrian Railways
- Syrian Telecom
- Syrian-Qatari Holding Company
- Syria TV
- Syrian News Channel
- Syrian Drama TV
- Syrian General Insurance Corporation

== Tanzania ==
The Government of Tanzania owns a number of commercial enterprises in the country via the Treasury Registrar. It wholly owns the following corporations unless indicated otherwise:

- Air Tanzania
- Arusha International Conference Centre
- Marine Services Company
- TANESCO
- Tanzania Railways Corporation
- Tanzania Telecommunications Corporation (65%)
- TAZARA Railway (50%)
- TIPER (50%)

== Trinidad and Tobago ==
- Caribbean Airlines
- Lake Asphalt of Trinidad and Tobago
- National Infrastructure Development Company
- Public Transport Service Corporation
- Telecommunications Services of Trinidad and Tobago
- TTPost
- UDeCOTT

== Tunisia ==
- Compagnie Tunisienne de Navigation
- Entreprise Tunisienne d'Activités Pétrolières
- La Poste Tunisienne
- Tunisian Railways
- Établissement de la radiodiffusion-télévision tunisienne
  - Radio Tunisienne
  - Télévision Tunisienne

== Turkey ==
- AnadoluJet
- Aselsan
- BOTAŞ
- Borsa Istanbul (%80.60)
- Central Bank of Turkey (%55.12)
- Çaykur
- TPAO
- Turkish State Railways
- Eti Maden
- HAVELSAN
- Mechanical and Chemical Industry Corporation
- THY/Turkish Airlines
- Turkish Aerospace Industries
- Türksat
- Turkcell (%26.2)
- Turk Telekom (%86)
- Halkbank
- Halk Katılım
- VakıfBank
- Vakıf Katılım
- Ziraat Bank
- Ziraat Katılım
- Turkish Radio and Television Corporation

== Venezuela ==
- Agropatria
- Alcasa
- Banco Bicentenario
- Banco de Venezuela
- Banco del Tesoro
- CANTV
- Citgo
- Corporación Venezolana de Guayana
- Corpoelec
- Pequiven
- Ferrominera del Orinoco
- Mission Mercal
- Monte Ávila Editores
- PDVAL
- PDVSA
- SIDOR
- Venalum
- VIT, C.A.
- Ciudad CCS
- Correo del Orinoco
- Diario Vea
- TeleSUR
- Colombeia
- TVes
- Venezolana de Televisión
- ViVe

== Vietnam ==
- Airports Corporation of Vietnam
- Bank for Investment and Development of Vietnam
- Petrolimex
- Petrovietnam
- State Capital Investment Corporation
- Vietnam Airlines
- Vietnam Air Services Company
- Vietnam Electricity
- Vietnam Multimedia Corporation
- Vietnam Posts and Telecommunications Group
- Viettel Group
- Vietnam Railways
- Vietnam Television
- Vinacomin
- Vinatex

== Zambia ==
- TAZARA Railway
- Zambia Airports Corporation Limited
- ZESCO
- Zambia National Broadcasting Corporation

== Zimbabwe ==
- ZimPost
- Zimbabwe Broadcasting Corporation

== See also ==
- Government-owned companies by country (category)
- Lists of government-owned companies (category)
- List of privatizations
- National oil company
- Public grocery store
- State ownership

== Bibliography ==
- Profiles of Existing Government Corporations—A Study Prepared by the U.S. General Accounting Office for the Committee on Government Operations (PDF), Washington, DC: U.S. Government Printing Office, 1988, p. 301, GAO/AFMD-89-43FS Document: H402-4. Alternate location:
