= Yván Gil =

Venezuelan diplomat and politician (born 1972)

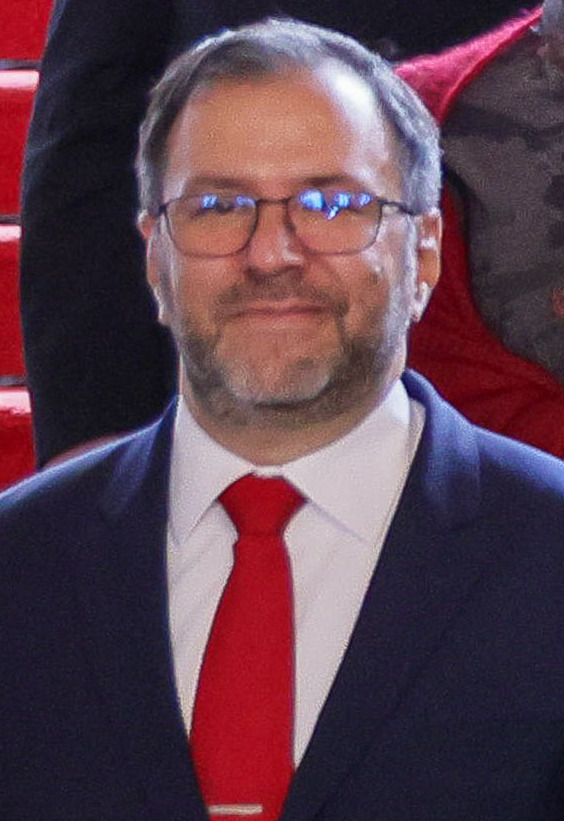
- Gil in 2025

Minister of Science and Technology
- Incumbent
- Assumed office 14 July 2026
- President: Delcy Rodríguez
- Preceded by: Gabriela Jiménez Ramírez

Minister of Foreign Affairs
- In office 6 January 2023 – 14 July 2026
- President: Nicolás Maduro; Delcy Rodríguez
- Preceded by: Carlos Faría
- Succeeded by: Félix Plasencia

Minister of People's Power for Agriculture and Land
- In office 9 June 2015 – 6 January 2016
- President: Nicolás Maduro
- Preceded by: José Luis Berroterán
- Succeeded by: José Luis Berroterán
- In office 21 April 2013 – 2 September 2014
- President: Nicolás Maduro
- Preceded by: Juan Carlos Loyo
- Succeeded by: Wilmar Castro Soteldo

Personal details
- Born: Yván Eduardo Gil Pinto; 15 August 1972 (age 54) Maracay, Venezuela
- Party: United Socialist Party of Venezuela (PSUV)
- Education: Central University of Venezuela

Yván Eduardo Gil Pinto (born 15 August 1972) is a Venezuelan diplomat and politician serving as the Minister of Science and Technology of Venezuela since 2026. He previously served as the Minister of Foreign Affairs from January 2023 to July 2026.

== Biography ==
Gil holds a degree in agricultural engineering from the Central University of Venezuela, and also pursued a doctorate in biotechnology in Montpellier, France. Prior to his political career, he was president of the National Institute of Agricultural Research (INIA), and of the state-owned agricultural supply company Agropatria.

Gil is a member of the ruling United Socialist Party of Venezuela (PSUV). In 2013–2014 and 2015–2016, he served as Minister of Agriculture and Land, and in 2017, he was appointed Vice Minister for Europe at the Ministry of Foreign Affairs. In 2021–2022, he served as chargé d'affaires of Venezuela to the European Union in Brussels, Belgium.

Gil succeeded Carlos Faría as Minister of Foreign Affairs in January 2023; one commentator saw Gil's appointment as an attempt by president Nicolás Maduro to strengthen relations between Venezuela and the European Union, as his predecessor was viewed as close to the Russian government. In February 2024, Gil announced that the government of Venezuela ordered the United Nations human rights office in Caracas to shut down all operations, ordering the staff to leave the country within three days.

On 14 July 2026, interim president Delcy Rodríguez appointed Félix Plasencia to replace Gil as foreign minister and announced that Gil would be appointed Minister of Science and Technology.
