= Joanna Kopcińska =

Polish politician

Joanna Kopcińska MEP
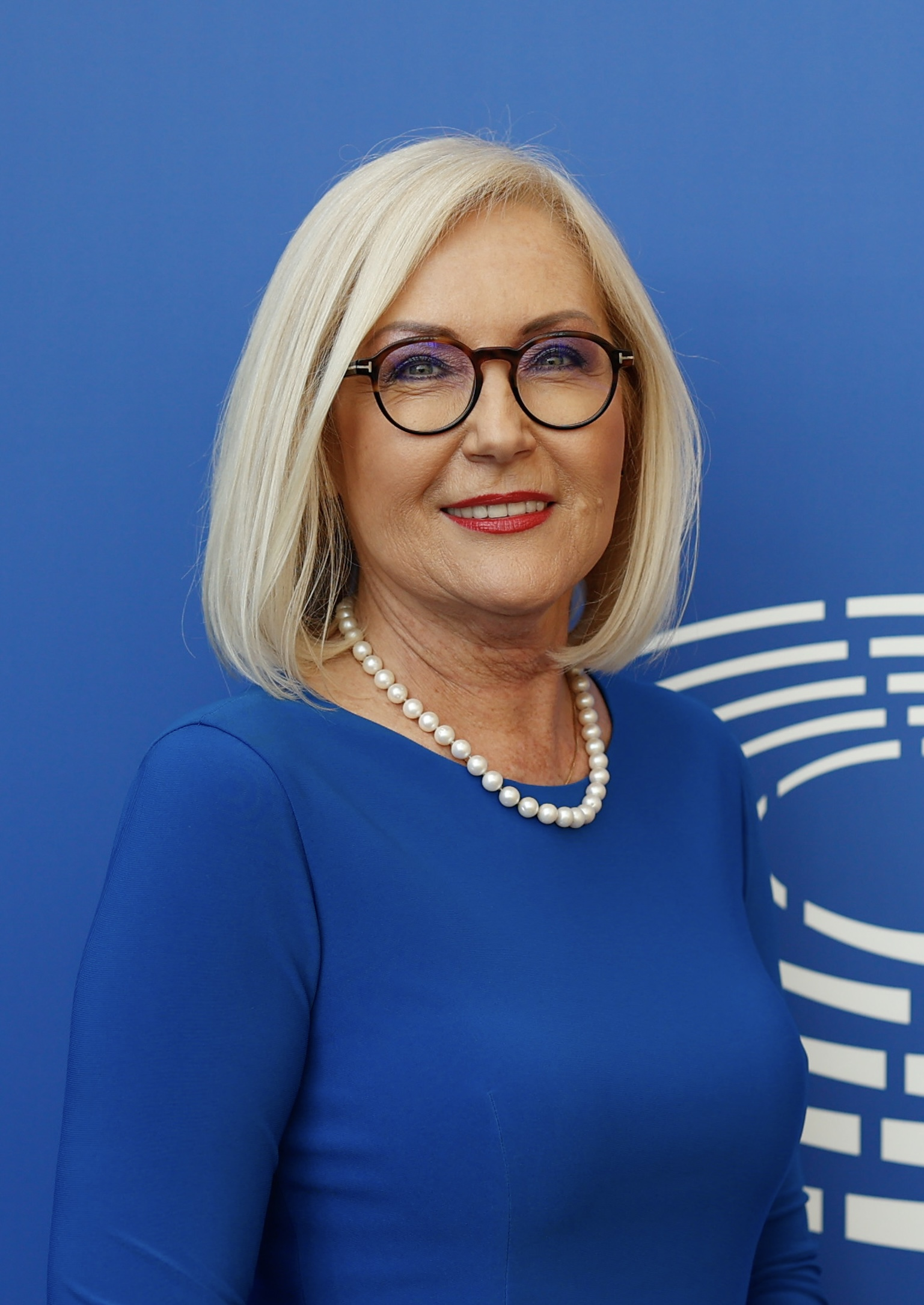

Member of the European Parliament for Poland

Personal details
- Born: 2 January 1967 (age 59) Łódź, Poland
- Party: Law and Justice

Joanna Maria Kopcińska (born 2 January 1967) is a Polish politician currently serving as a Member of the European Parliament for the Law and Justice political party.

== Career ==
A doctor by profession, Kopcińska graduated from the Medical University of Łódź in 1997. She completed postgraduate studies at the Nofer Institute of Occupational Medicine in the fields of health care organization, management, and economics (2002), as well as public and environmental health (2003). In 2017, she completed a Master of Business Administration. She worked as a university lecturer and co-founded the Senior Health Academy. She is a member of the Polish Society of Public Health, the Polish Society of Hospital Infections, the District Medical Chamber, and the Social Council of the Władysław Biegański Voivodeship Specialist Hospital in Łódź.

In the 2010 local elections, Kopcińska unsuccessfully ran for a position on the Łódź City Council as a part of the Civic Platform party. She was elected to the city council in 2011, replacing Tomasz Sadzyński. In August 2013, she and a group of other city councilors left Civic Platform, and they formed their own group, titled "Łódź 2020". The same month, she was elected chairwoman of the city council as a result of support from the opposition Law and Justice and the Democratic Left Alliance. In 2014, she left the position of chairwoman and became the Law and Justice candidate for the mayor of Łódź. She received 22.89% of the total votes, losing the election to Hanna Zdanowska of Civic Platform.

In 2014, Kopcińska was elected to the 5th term of the Łódź Voivodeship Sejmik as a member of Law and Justice and eventually became vice chairwoman of the Sejmik. In the 2015 parliamentary election, she ran for the Sejm Constituency no. 9 seat on the Law and Justice list (initially as an independent, but she later joined Law and Justice). She won the election and became a member of parliament in the Sejm's 8th term. In the Sejm, she became vice chairwoman of the Health Committee and joined the Amber Gold Investigative Committee in 2016. In 2016, she became head of Law and Justice's Łodz district branch.

In 2019, Kopcińska became spokesperson for the First Cabinet of Mateusz Morawiecki and Secretary of State in the Chancellery of the Prime Minister. She won the election for the 9th term of the 2019 European Parliament election for the Łódź district.

== Personal life ==
Kopcińska is married and has a son.
