= List of Sheikh Sabah Al-Ahmad Al-Jaber Al-Sabah Prize recipients =

This is a list of recipients of the Sheikh Sabah Al-Ahmad Al-Jaber Al-Sabah Prize awarded by World Health Organization (WHO). HH Sheikh Sabah Al-Ahmad Al-Jaber Al-Sabah (1929–2020) Prize is awarded for research in health care for the elderly and health promotion by the State of Kuwait Health Promotion Foundation to the individual(s) or institution(s). The prize consists of a certificate of achievement, a plaque from the organization's founder, and an amount of money that cannot exceed 40,000 USD.

== List of recipients ==
Year	Name	Country
2006	Early Psychosis Intervention Programme	Singapore
2008	Zaza Metreveli	Georgia
2008	Chuon Chantopheas	Cambodia
2009	Shaikha Salim Al Arrayed	Bahrain
2009	Nofer Institute of Occupational Medicine	Poland
2011	Wang De Chen	China
2011	Association tchadienne Communauté pour le progrès	Chad
2012	Eltahir Medani Elshibly	Sudan
2013	Guiqi Wang	China
2015	Alaa Eldien Mohamed El Ghamrawy	Egypt
2016	Michal Novák	Slovakia
2018	El Badr Association, Cancer Patient Association	Algeria
2019	Aging and Fragility in the Elderly Group of the Research Institute of La Paz Hospital	Spain
2020	Gunhild Waldemar	Denmark
2021	National Center for Gerontology	China
2022	Hanadi Khamis Mubarak Al Hamad	Qatar
2023	The National Center for Chronic and Noncommunicable Disease Control and Prevention	China
2023	Abla Mehio Sibai	Lebanon
2024	Ahmed Hamed Saif Al Wahaibi	Oman
2024	Chinese Geriatrics Society	China
