= Alcasa =

Venezuelan aluminium producer

The graphic shows the production of liquid aluminium by Alcasa from 2007 to 2015. Data are from the Memoria 2011 and 2015 of the Ministerio del Poder Popular para Industrias of Venezuela.

C.V.G. Aluminio del Caroní S.A., known as Alcasa, is a state-owned aluminium producer in Venezuela. Founded in 1960, it began operations in 1967. It is part of the Corporación Venezolana de Guayana mining company, and one of the world's largest aluminium producers. In 1999, it had around 9000 employees.

The Venezuelan government had sought to privatize Alcasa in 1998, but the investors pulled out citing world market conditions.

In 2005, the BBC reported that Alcasa had instituted a "co-management" initiative, with workers electing managers and participating in the budgeting process, as well as being involved in decisions on technical issues related to production. The experience was evaluated negatively by President Nicolás Maduro in 2013: "The model of worker control failed in Guayana, it never existed; neither control nor worker."
