= Plovput (Serbia) =

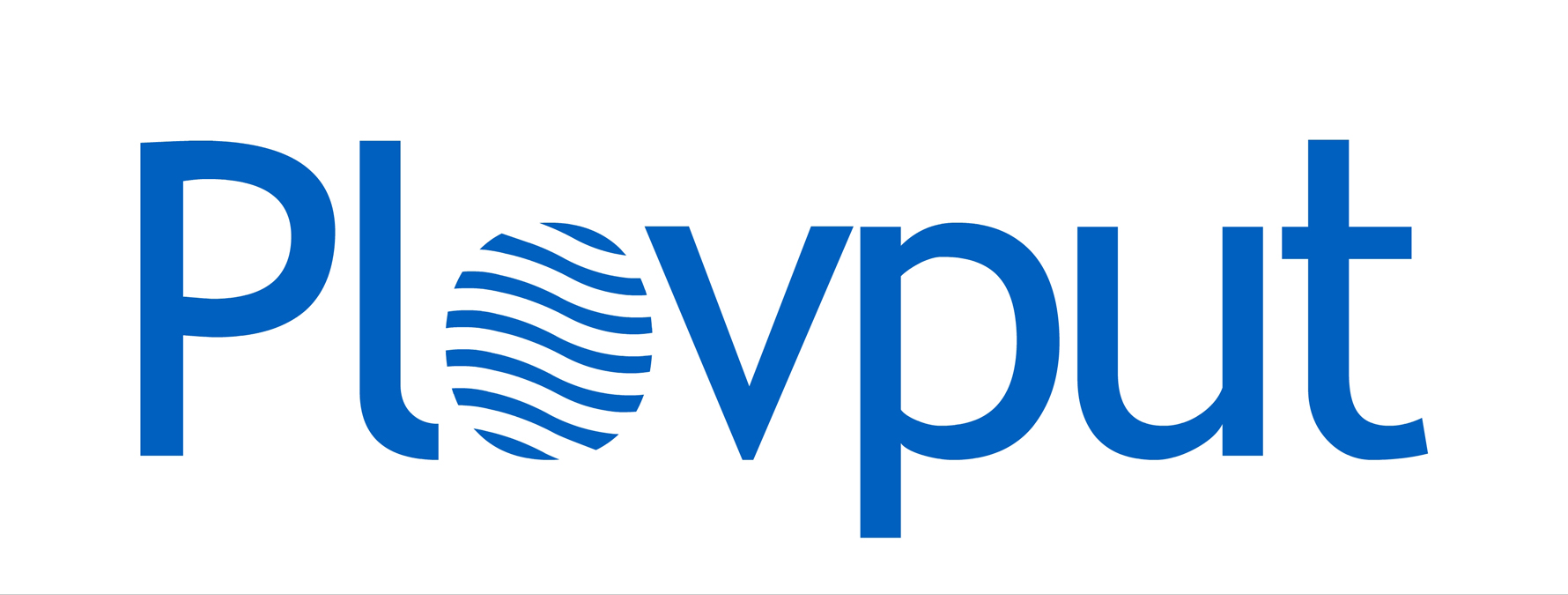
Plovput logo

The Directorate for Inland Waterways (Plovput) is a special organization of the Government of the Republic of Serbia responsible for maintenance and development of international and interstate inland waterways in the Republic of Serbia (the Danube, Sava, and Tisza rivers).

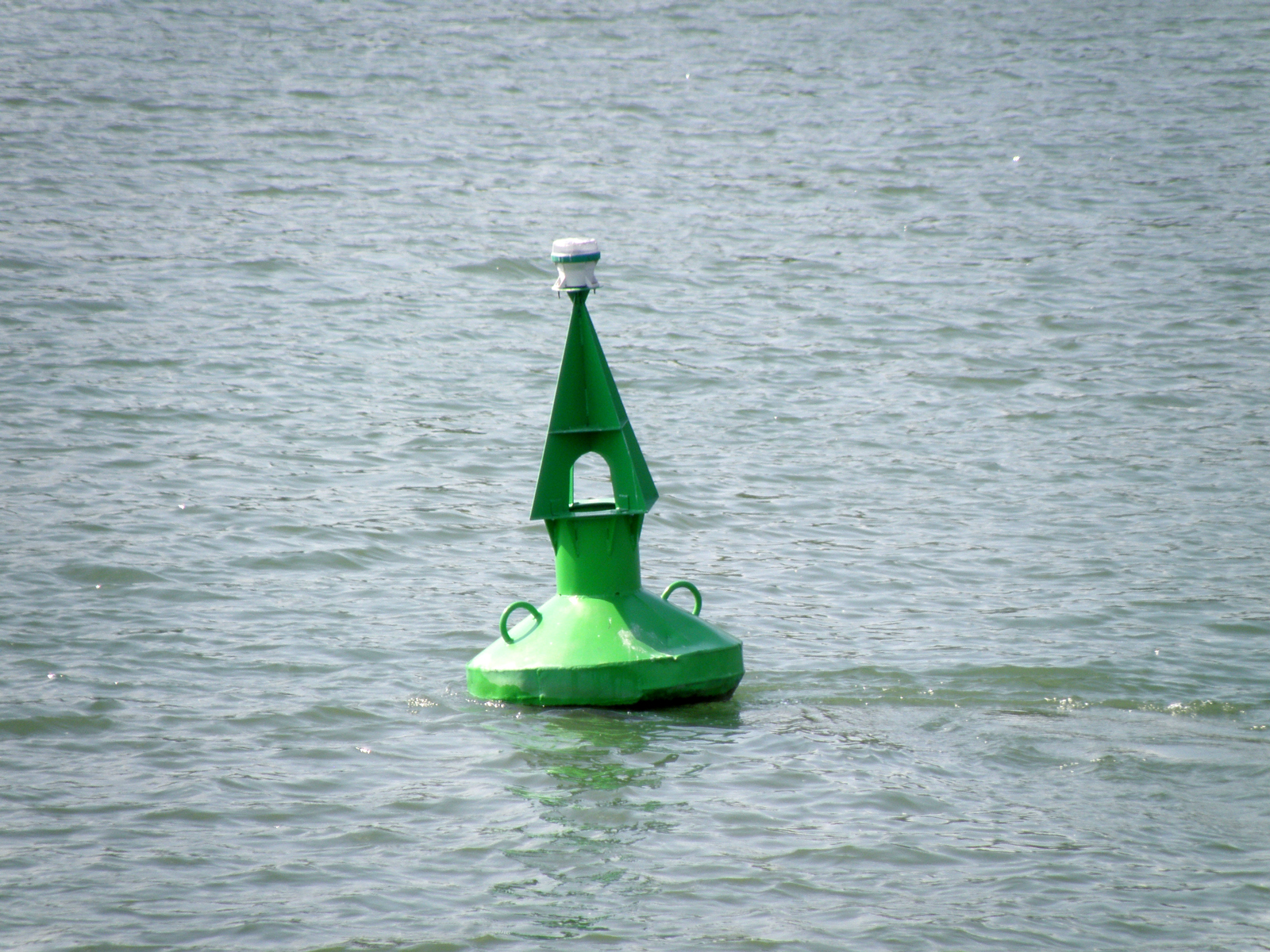
Buoy equipped with solar lamp

== History ==
Plovput was established in 1963, under the name Federal Public Institution for Maintenance and Development of Inland Waterways. During the last half a century, Plovput implemented over 500 projects. Today, it has 101 employees.

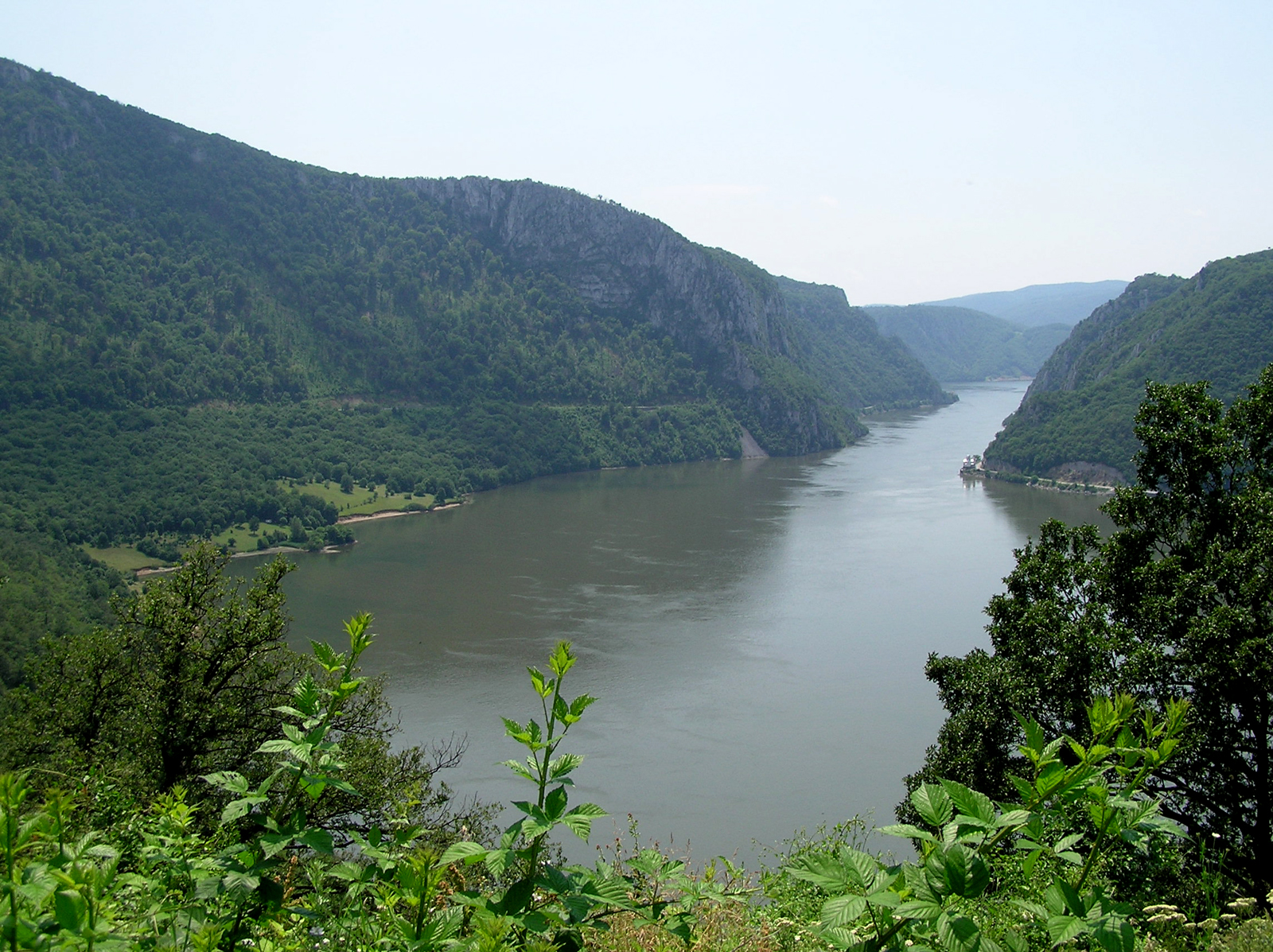
Kazani, Danube river

== Responsibilities ==
The responsibilities of Plovput are defined under the Law on Navigation and Ports on Inland Waterways (October 2010). The main activities of Plovput include:

- Hydrographic surveys
- Fairway design
- IWW marking
- River training works
- Development of River Information Services (RIS)
- Issuing feasibility conditions, opinions and approvals.

== International activities ==
Plovput is also active on international level. Our experts participate at working groups of relevant international institutions in the field of inland waterways (Danube Commission, International Sava River Basin Commission, UNECE – group for inland waterway transport, PIANC, International Hydrographic Organization, GIS Forum Danube). Plovput is a partner on international projects funded by the EU, on which it cooperates with other Danube administrations, creating strategic partnerships.
