= Laatumaa =

Laatumaa (“quality land”) is the real-estate division of Metsähallitus, Finland's state-owned forest administration enterprise.

As one of Metsähallitus’ business divisions, Laatumaa buys, sells and leases out forest land and property. Its primary task is furnishing and selling state-owned plots to Finnish families who use them build holiday homes. Laatumaa also sells larger, developed properties, including fishing cabins and ski chalets. The division also participates in wind-energy projects.

Laatumaa aims to work in environmentally friendly ways and support local communities, according to its mission statement.
