= FertiNitro =

FertiNitro (Fertilizantes Nitrogenados de Oriente) is Venezuela's largest fertilizer company, producing around 1.5m tons of urea per year. It was nationalised in October 2010, having previously been owned by Pequiven (35%) and Koch Industries (35%). The nationalization led to negotiations for repayment of the bonds FertiNitro had issued, which led to the Government ultimately offering 105 cents on the dollar (i.e., the bonds' principal plus a portion of the contractual make-whole).

FertiNitro is one of the world's main producers of nitrogen fertilizer, with daily production capacity of 3,600 tonnes of ammonia and 4,400 tonnes of urea.
