= Corporación Venezolana de Guayana =

State-owned Venezuelan metal conglomerate

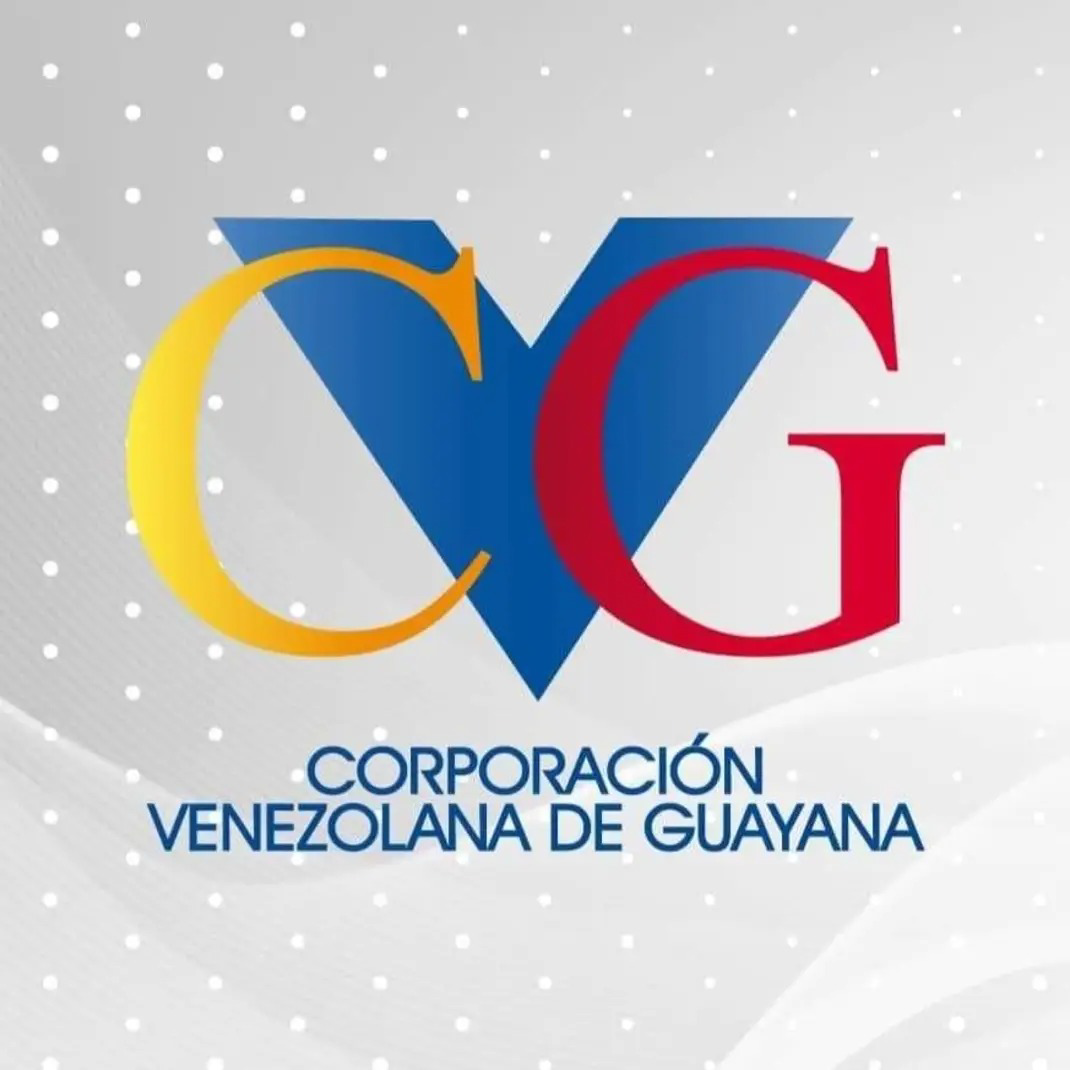
- Company type: Conglomerates; State-owned enterprise (Public)
- Industry: mining and natural resources
- Founded: 1960
- Headquarters: Guayana, Bolivar State, Venezuela
- Website: CVG (in Spanish)

The Corporacion Venezolana de Guayana (CVG) is a state-owned Venezuelan metal conglomerate, located in the Guayana Region in the southeast of the country. Its subsidiaries include the steel producer SIDOR, aluminium producers Alcasa, Venalum and gold mining Minerven.

In April 2023, Venezuelan attorney general Tarek Saab said that 51 people had been detained in connection with a corruption investigation at CVG and the state oil company PDVSA.
