= Guayana Region, Venezuela =

Administrative region of eastern Venezuela

Coordinates: 7°16′N 62°48′W

Guayana Region Región Guayana
- Region
- Interactive map of Guayana Region
- Country: Venezuela
- Formation: 11 June 1969
- Largest city: Ciudad Guayana

Area
  - Total: 458,344 km^{2} (176,968 sq mi)

Population
  - Total: 1,383,297

The Guayana Region (Spanish: Región Guayana [reˈxjoŋ gwaˈʝana]) is one of 9 administrative regions of Venezuela. Historically called Spanish Guiana (Spanish: Guayana Española) or simply Guayana, the region is made up of the states of Amazonas, Bolívar, and Delta Amacuro.

== History ==
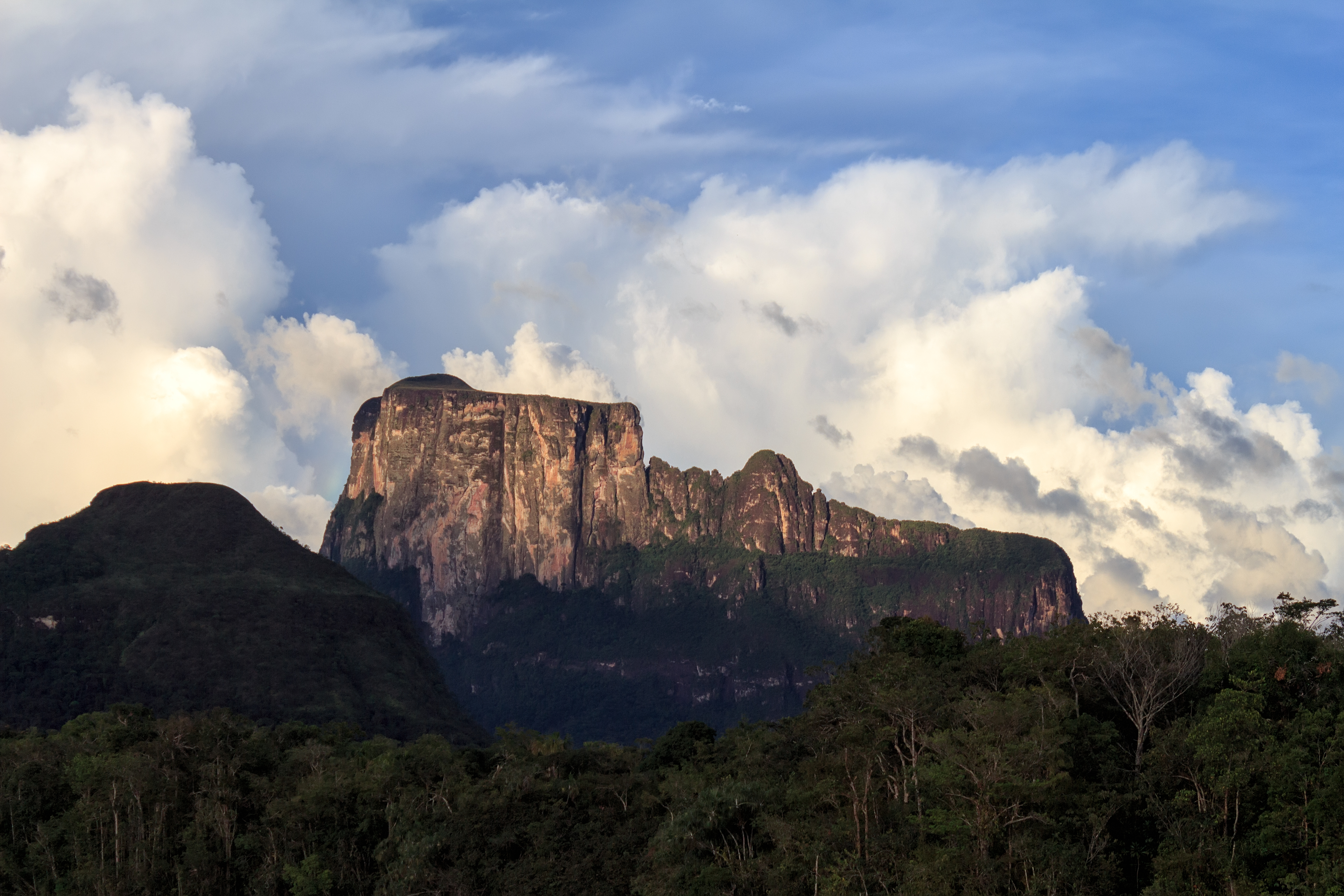
Tepuy Autana (Kuaymayojo) in Amazonas, Venezuela

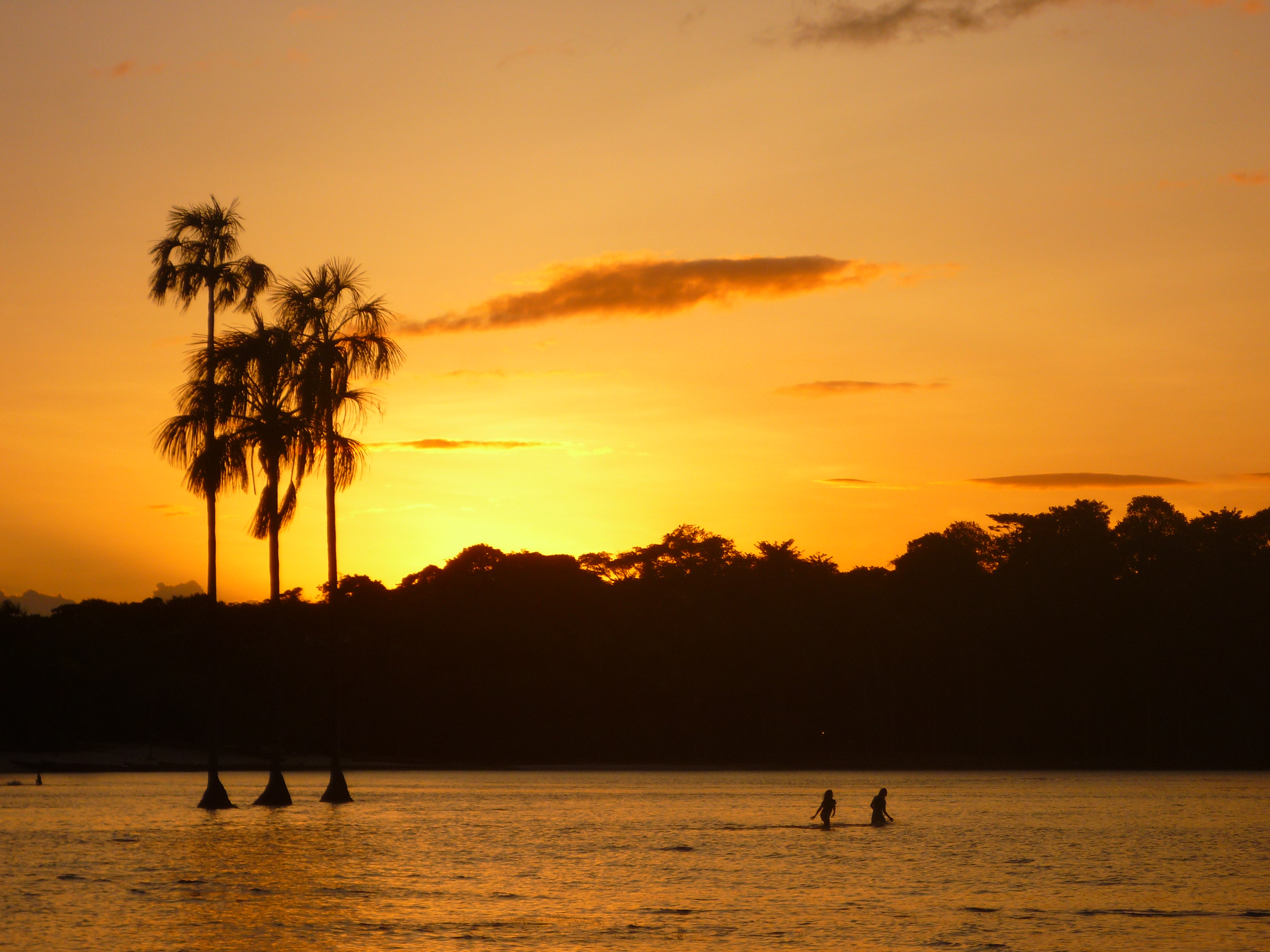
Canaima Lagoon, Guayana Region, Venezuela

Relief map of Venezuela

In the 1970s, after the process of forming the Political-Administrative Regions through CORDIPLAN in the government of Rafael Caldera, the Region of Guyana was formed. It was originally composed of Bolívar State and Delta Amacuro State (at that time it had the status of a Federal Territory). The Amazonas State (called Territorio Federal Amazonas) was the only one that made up the so-called Southern Region (Región Sur). In the following decade, following a legal reform, the state of Amazonas was integrated into this region.

== Geography ==
The region has a population of 1,383,297 inhabitants and a territory of 458,344 km^{2} (176,968 sq mi), slightly over half the area of the whole country.

During the colonial period until the early 18th century, it was known as Spanish Guiana. It borders the independent nations of Guyana (formerly British Guiana) and Brazil.

Geologically it is part of the Guiana Shield, and is also known as the Venezuelan Guayana. The higher elevation Guayana Highlands and its tepuis (mesas) are in the southwestern section.

== Political division ==
Almost the entirety of this immense region is formed by the states of Amazonas and Bolívar, but we must also consider that the entire southern part of the state of Delta Amacuro corresponds to it.

The main cities of the region are Ciudad Guayana, with more than half a million inhabitants and which is made up of Puerto Ordaz and San Félix; the capital of the State of Bolívar, Ciudad Bolívar, Upata, Caicara del Orinoco, Tumeremo, Guasipati, El Callao, El Manteco, Santa Elena de Uairén, all of these in the State of Bolívar and the capital of Amazonas, Puerto Ayacucho. As far as the state of Delta Amacuro, south of the Orinoco, is concerned, there is no population with more than a thousand inhabitants. But there are small towns like El Triunfo, which is 22 km from Ciudad Guayana, and Piacoa a little over 50 km.

The region comprises, according to Venezuelan law, four of the federal States of Venezuela:

- Amazonas State
- Bolívar State
- Delta Amacuro State
- Guayana Esequiba State

Some of the biggest towns and cities include:

- Ciudad Guayana (population 978,202)
- Ciudad Bolívar (population 422,578)
- Puerto Ayacucho (41,000)
- Tucupita (86,487)

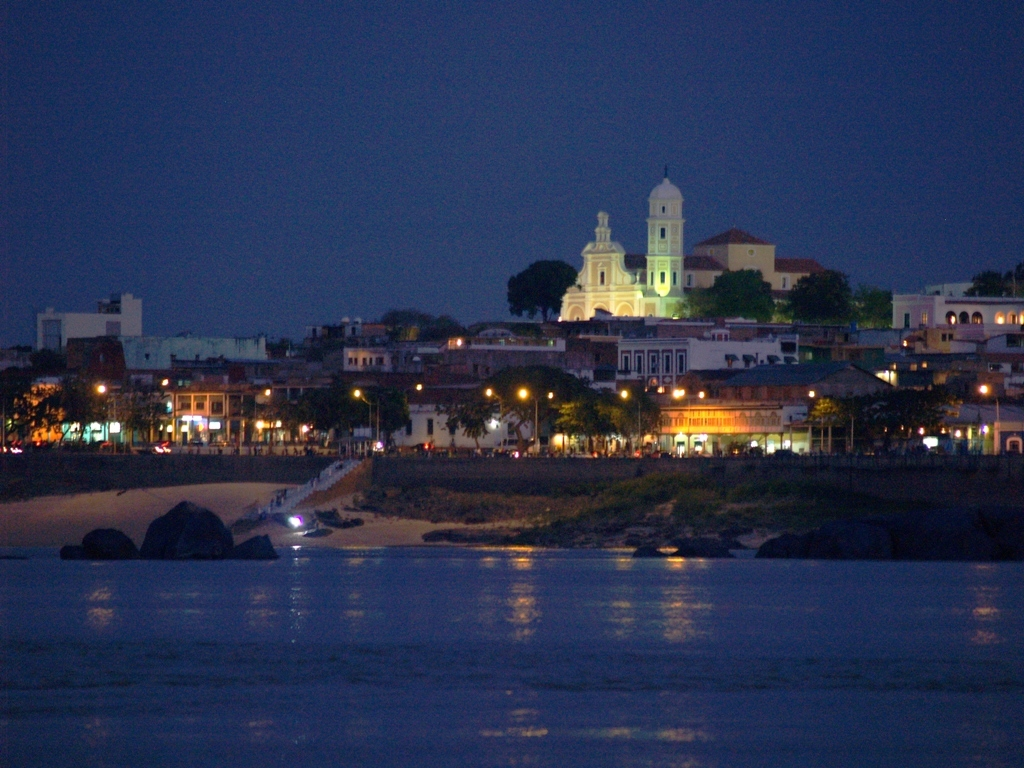
Ciudad Bolívar (Bolívar City), Bolívar State, Guayana Region

== Relief ==
The relief of the Guayana Region is very varied, including plains and savannahs, with heights ranging from 100 to 500 m. The Gran Sabana is a plain with an average altitude of 1,000 m. and is home to the tepuis, extraordinary geological formations, including the 2.810 m Roraima, the Auyantepui, with the highest waterfall in the world; the Salto Ángel, with its almost one thousand meters of vertical drop; and several sierras or mountain ranges which reach considerable peaks and whose culminating point is the Marahuaca hill with its 3,840 m. Everything about the relief can be seen in greater detail in each of the states that make up Guyana and will be described separately in each of them.

=== Weather ===
Depending on the altitude, a diversity of climates can be found, from torrid (hot) on the banks of the Orinoco, through a very mild (temperate) climate in La Gran Sabana, to the cool climate of the peaks of the tepuy es and the region's mountain ranges.

=== Vegetation ===
Due to its immense extension, the vegetation of the Guiana Region, with the exception of that generated by the eternal snows of the Andes and the dunes of Falcon, is a sample of all the vegetation that covers the Venezuelan soil, effectively through its wide geography, There is halophytic vegetation, which is typical of mangroves, herbaceous vegetation of the savannahs, xerophytic vegetation which is that of the thorn or xerophytic forest, the hydrophilic vegetation of the forests, and that of the cloud forest on the mountain slopes.

=== Geology ===
The region of the Guiana Shield is characterized by steep-sided, flat-topped mountains called tepui (plural "tepuis"), composed of ancient rocks up to 2000 million years old.

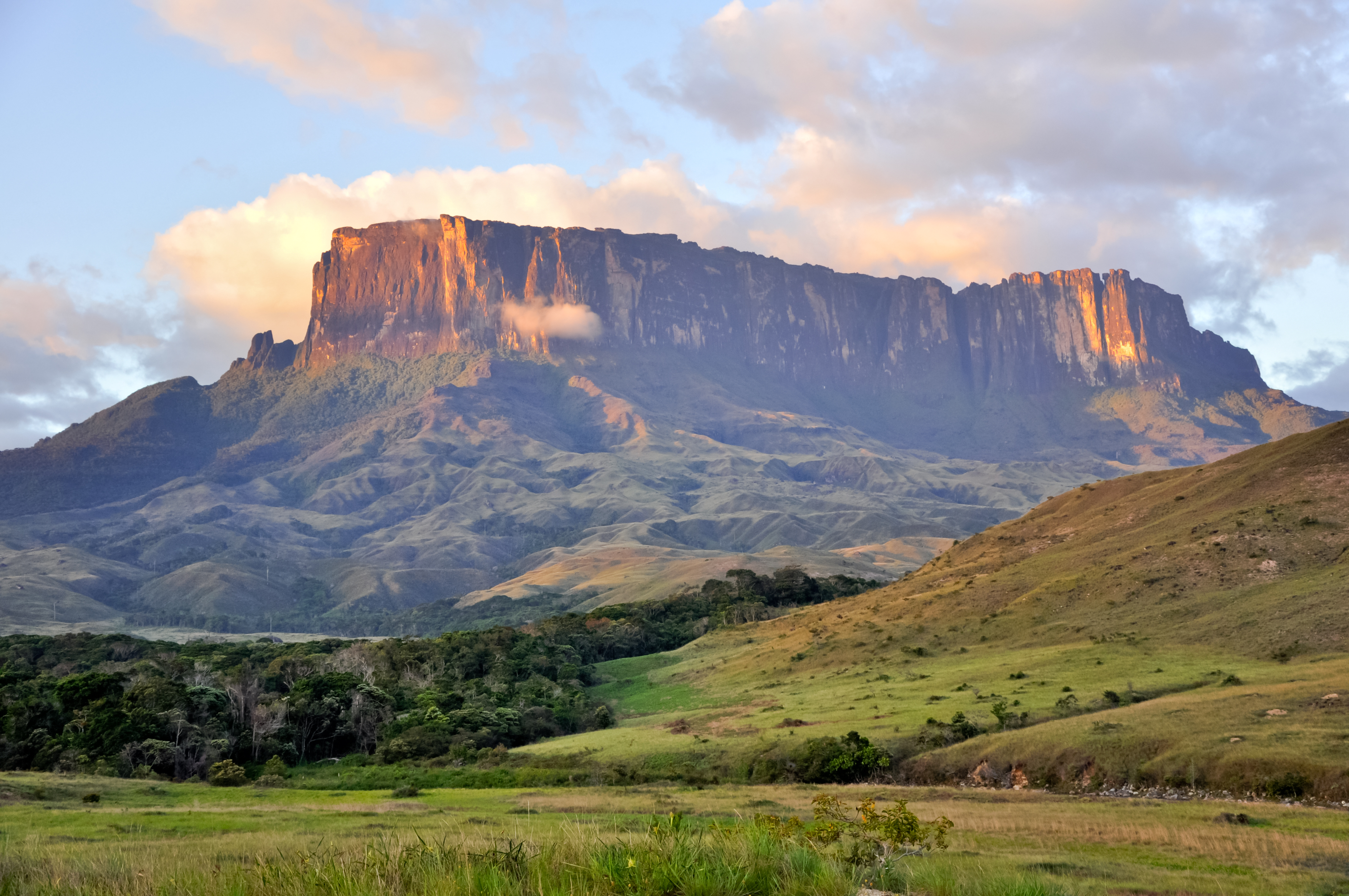
Kukenan Tepui at sunset

Among these formations are Roraima (2810 msnm), Kukenán (2680 masl), and the Auyantepui (2535 masl) all within El Parque Nacional De Canaima.

== Economy ==
The gold mine at El Callao (Venezuela), started in 1871, was for a time one of the richest in the world, and the goldfields as a whole saw over a million ounces exported between 1860 and 1883. The gold mining was dominated by immigrants from the British Isles and the British West Indies, giving an appearance of almost creating an English colony on Venezuelan territory.

In 1926, a Venezuelan mining inspector found one of the richest iron ore deposits near the Orinoco delta, south of the city of San Felix on a mountain named El Florero. Full-scale mining of the ore deposits began after World War II, by a conglomerate of Venezuelan firms and US steel companies. At the start in the early 1950s, about 10,000 tons of ore-bearing soil was mined per day.

Los Pijiguaos, bauxite deposit and associated mining development, on the Pijiguaos Plateau, in western Bolívar state, Venezuela. Discovered in 1974, this large, high-quality, laterite-type deposit underlies some 2,000 square miles (5,200 km^{2}) and is located approximately 25 miles (40 km) east of the Orinoco River.

In the area of the Macizo Guayanés, many resources are extracted, which come mainly from the mines and deposits of the Cuadrilátero Minero Bolivar.

The region also has vast forest reserves, and extensive rivers, as Orinoco and Caroni, that provide much of the electricity consumed in the country, as well as great tourism potential with places like Canaima National Park which includes the highest waterfall in the world (Angel Falls) and is rich in heavy oil that is concentrated in the northern area of Bolivar State.

In the region of Guayana, due to its great hydroelectric potential, it has mining wealth: that is to say, abundance of iron ore and bauxite, one of the main heavy industries of Latin America has been installed. Indeed, Siderúrgica del Orinoco, is a factory of API tubes and should also be considered the aluminum industry and others derived from the processing of steel and aluminum. Other important minerals in the region are nickel, manganese, uranium, coltan and mercury. There are also significant amounts of precious metals, (gold and platinum and diamonds).

== Gallery ==
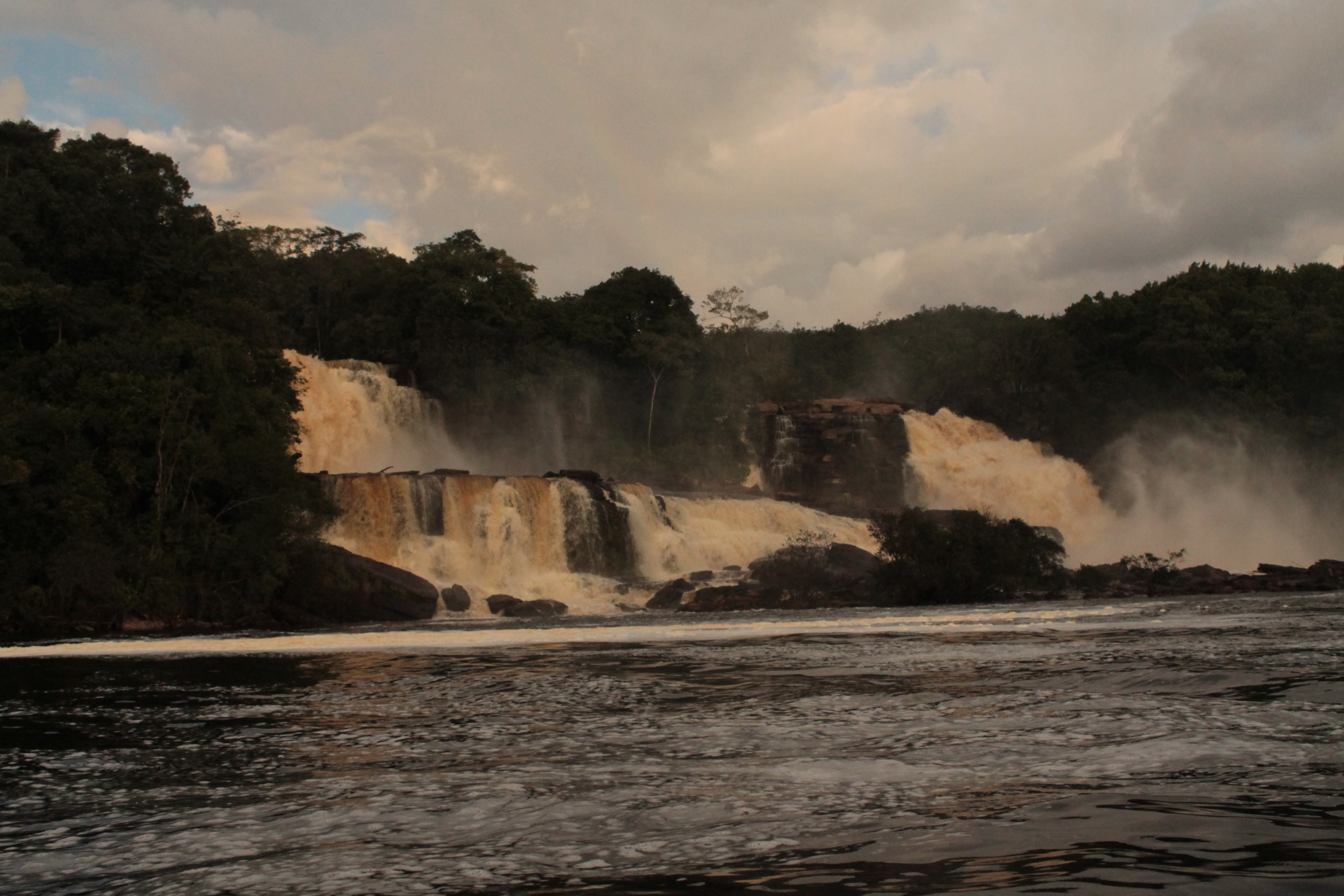
El Hacha Waterfall

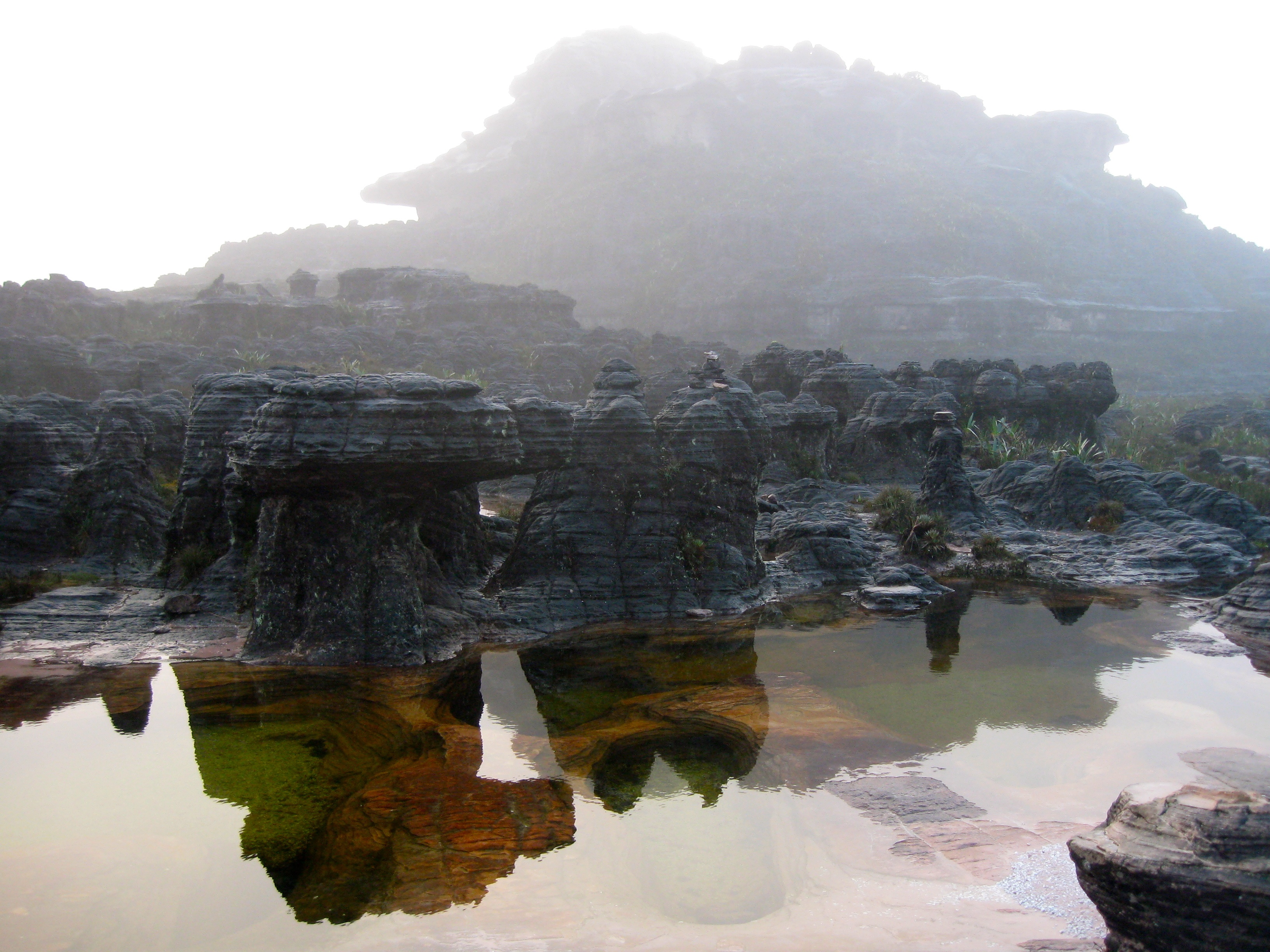
Mount Roraima (Monte Roraima)

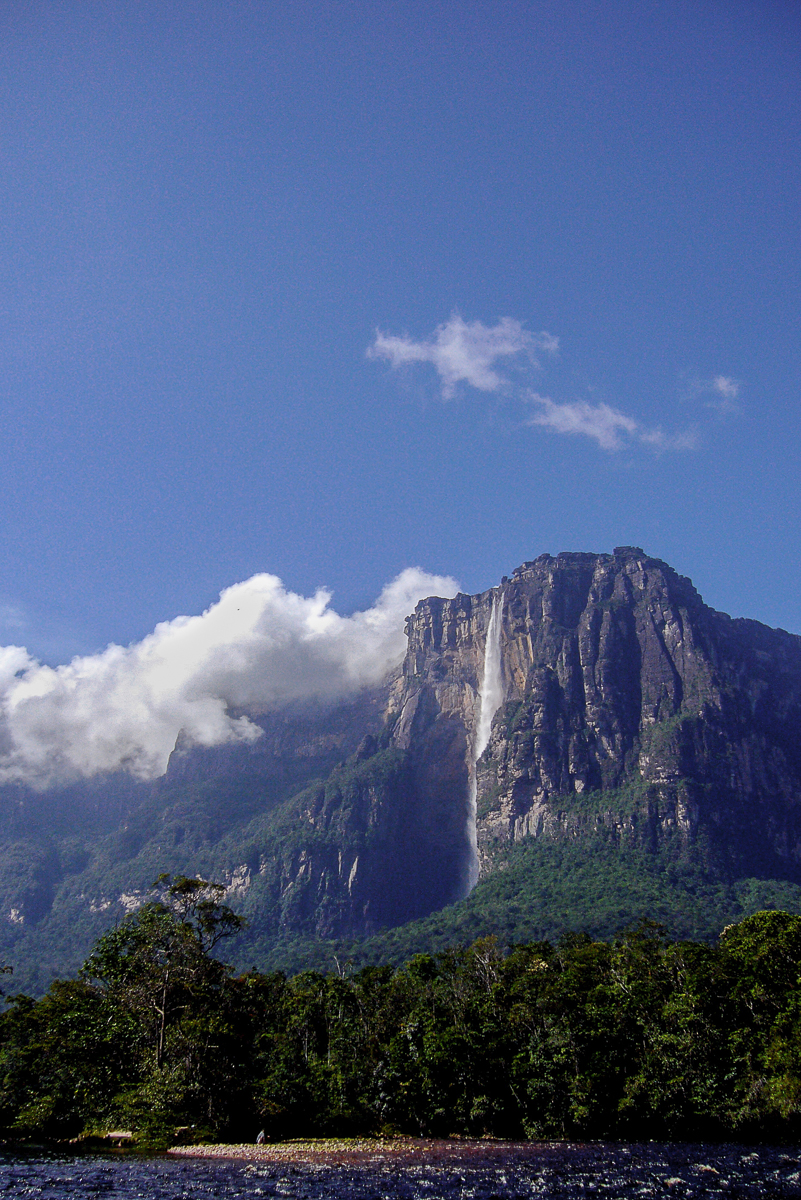
Angel Falls (Salto Ángel)

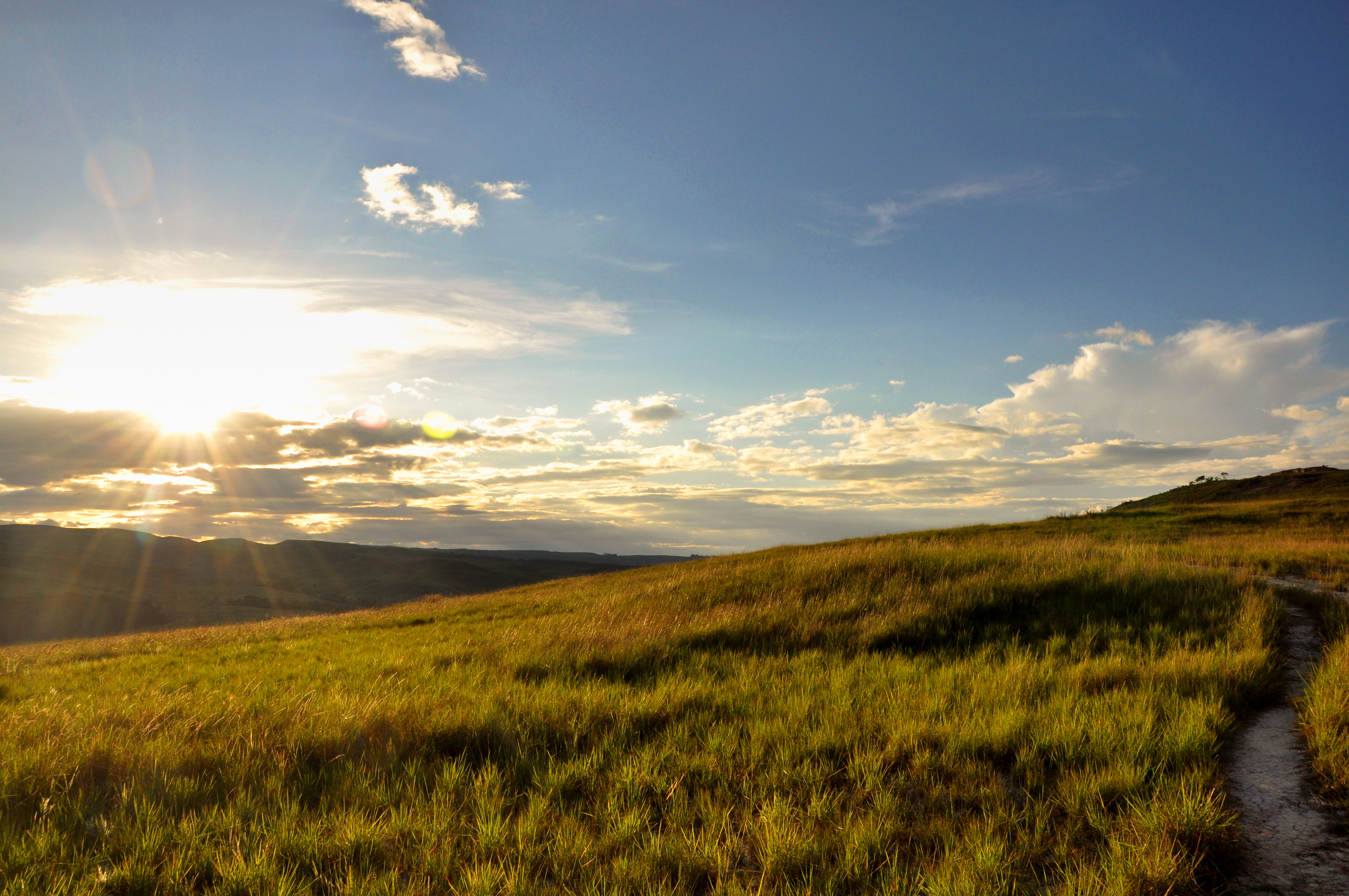
Gran Sabana

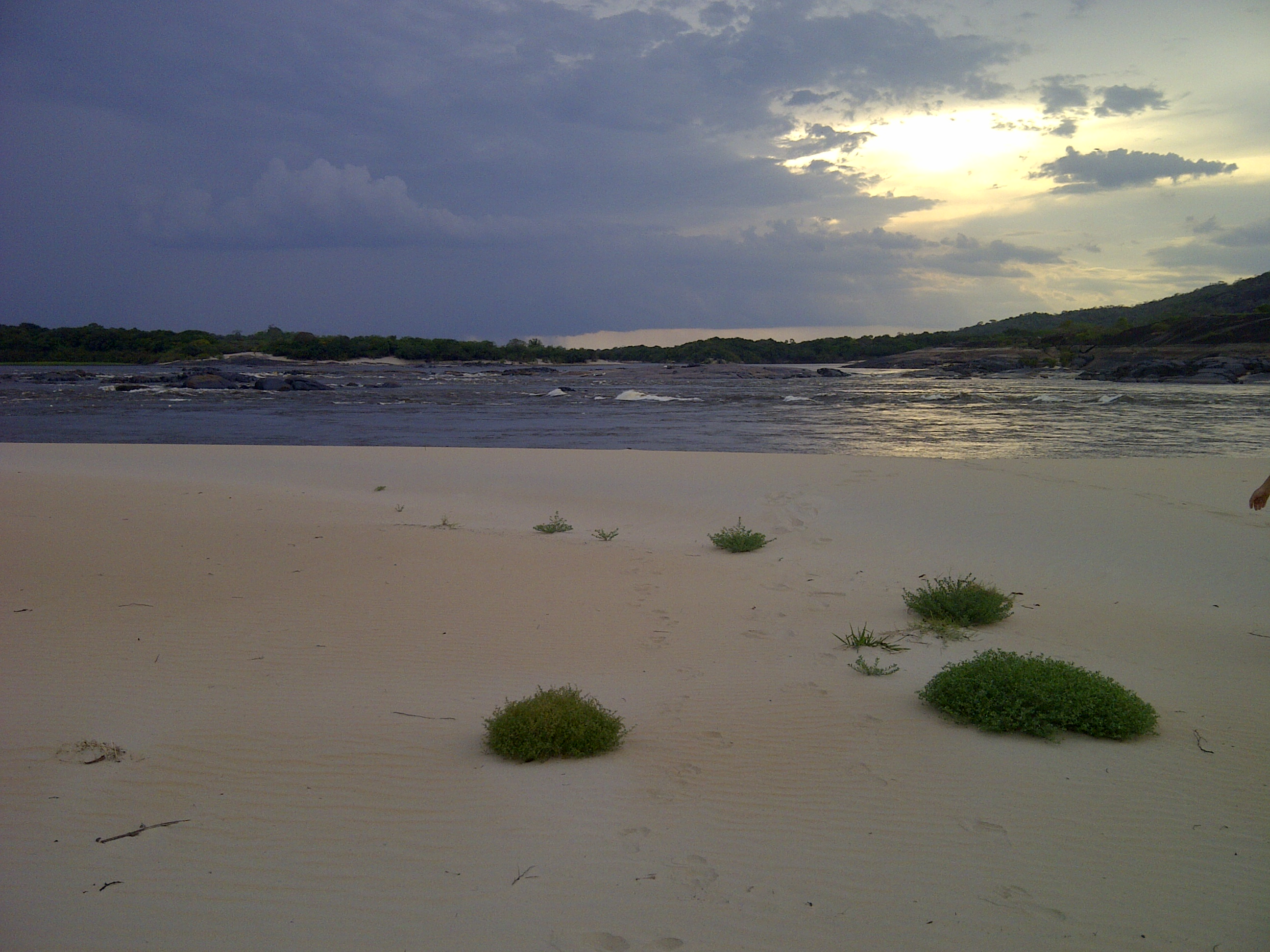
La Sardinata Beach, Venezuelan Amazonas

== See also ==
- Guayana Highlands topics
- Corporación Venezolana de Guayana – a state-owned corporation for the extraction of natural resources in the Guayana Region
