= Agropatria =

Venezuelan agribusiness

Agropatria is Venezuela's largest agricultural supply company, supplying fertilizer, seeds and agrochemicals, as well as loans to agricultural producers. It is a state-owned corporation which was incorporated in October 2010 to take over the activities of Agroisleña which was established in 1958.

== History of Agroisleña ==
Agroisleña was established in 1958 by Spanish immigrants, and grew to become the country’s leading agricultural supply company. It was accused by President Hugo Chavez of abusing its dominant market position.

== Impact ==
By May 2015, the Confederation of Agricultural Producers (Fedeagro) reported that Agropatria had a monopoly position in the market of agricultural supplements, having approximately 95% of market share, more than double of Agroisleña at the moment of the nationalization. Agropatria also has privileges when it comes to access foreign exchange for the importation of agricultural materials which is considered to be a detriment of private enterprises.
