= Nofer Institute of Occupational Medicine =

Polish research institute

The Nofer Institute of Occupational Medicine (NIOM) is a state-owned research institute in Łódź, Poland. It is the leading institute in the field of occupational and environmental health in Poland, and has the status of WHO Collaborating Centre.

The institute was established in 1954 as a unit of the Medical Academy of Łódź, and is now an independent institute. It provides expertise to the Ministry of Health and serves as an advisory body to several governmental agencies.

The institute is named for its former director Professor Jerzy Nofer.
