= Pedro Trebbau =

Venezuelan zoologist (1929–2021)

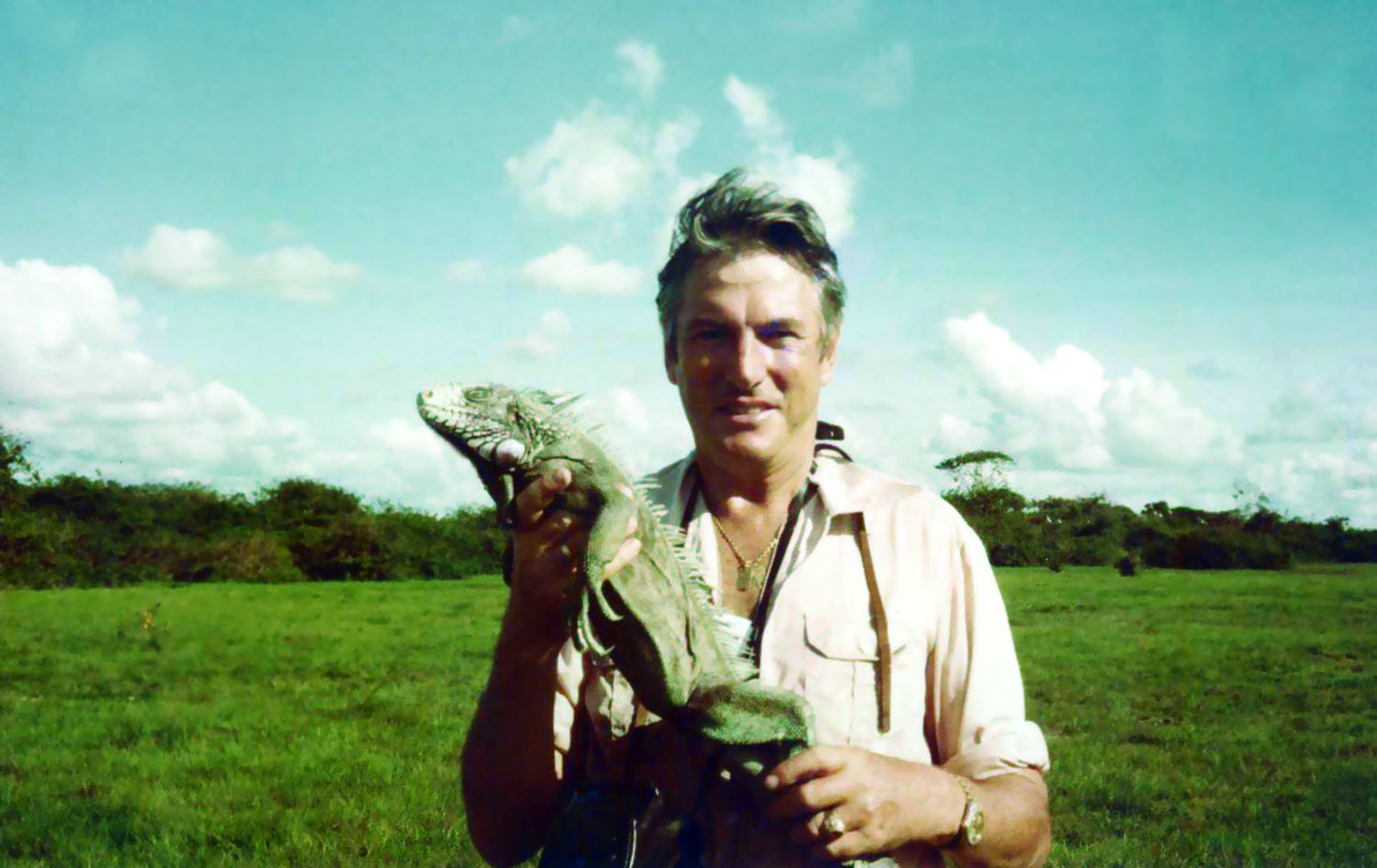
- Pedro Trebbau during the late 1970s
- Born: Karl Peter Trebbau Millowitsch; 20 May 1929; Cologne, Rhine, Prussia, Germany
- Died: 16 January 2021 (aged 91)
- Citizenship: Venezuelan
- Education: Goethe University Frankfurt; University of Freiburg; University of Giessen; University of Miami; Central University of Venezuela
- Scientific career
- Fields: Biology, TV presenter, research
- Workplaces: El Pinar Zoo, Caricuao Zoo, Institute of Tropical Zoology of the Central University of Venezuela

Pedro Trebbau (born Karl Peter Trebbau Millowitsch; 20 May 1929 – 16 January 2021) was a German-born Venezuelan zoologist. His career was characterized by the promotion and preservation of Venezuelan wildlife and nature. His research and collaboration with the herpetologist Peter Pritchard produced the still-extant reference book on The Turtles of Venezuela, the 2018 re-edition of which, alongside the biography done on him entitled Trebbau: Maestro por naturaleza by Albor Rodríguez, sparked the series Colección La Fauna, which aimed to collect Trebbau's work on the fauna of Venezuela.

== Biography ==
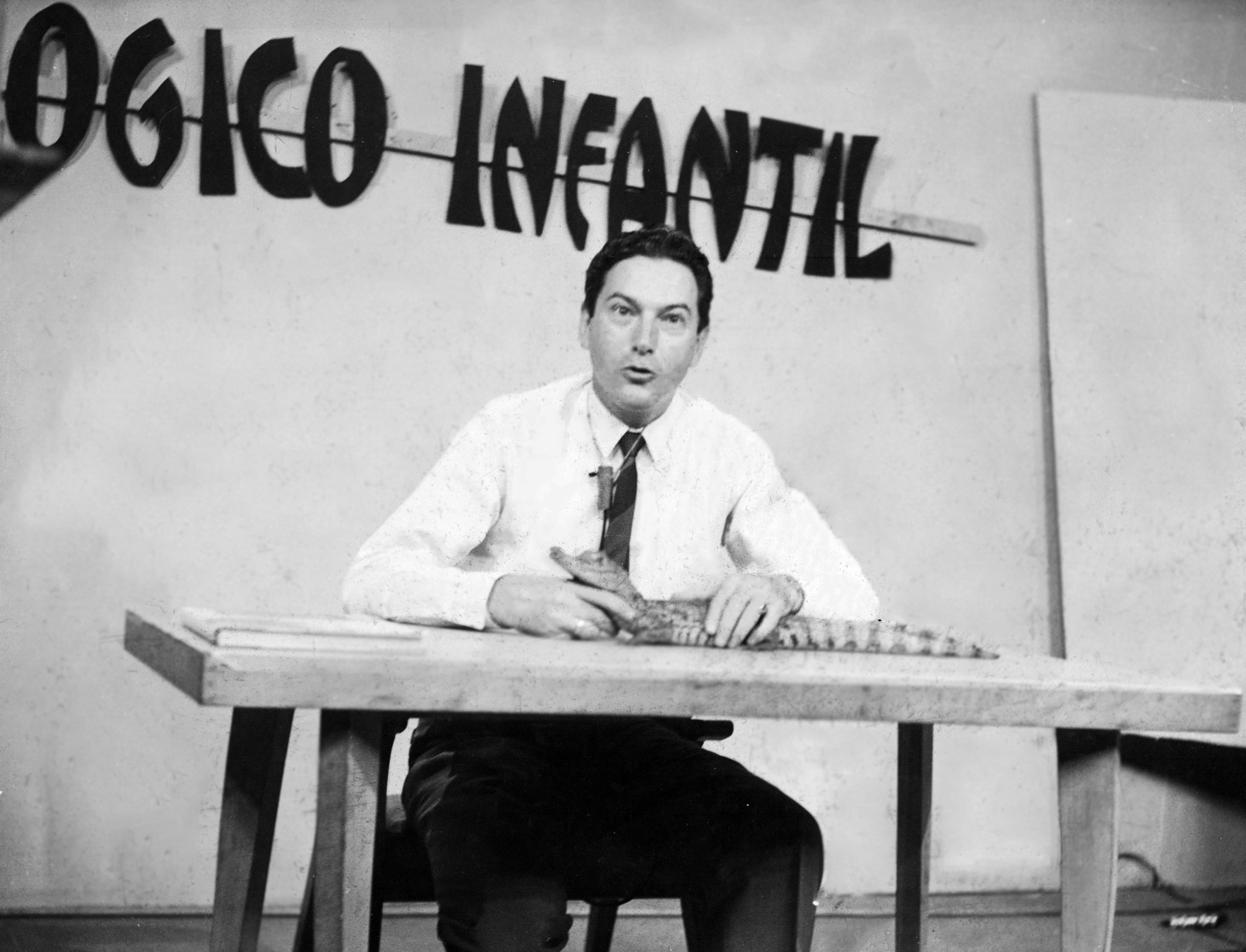
Children's Zoo TV Show

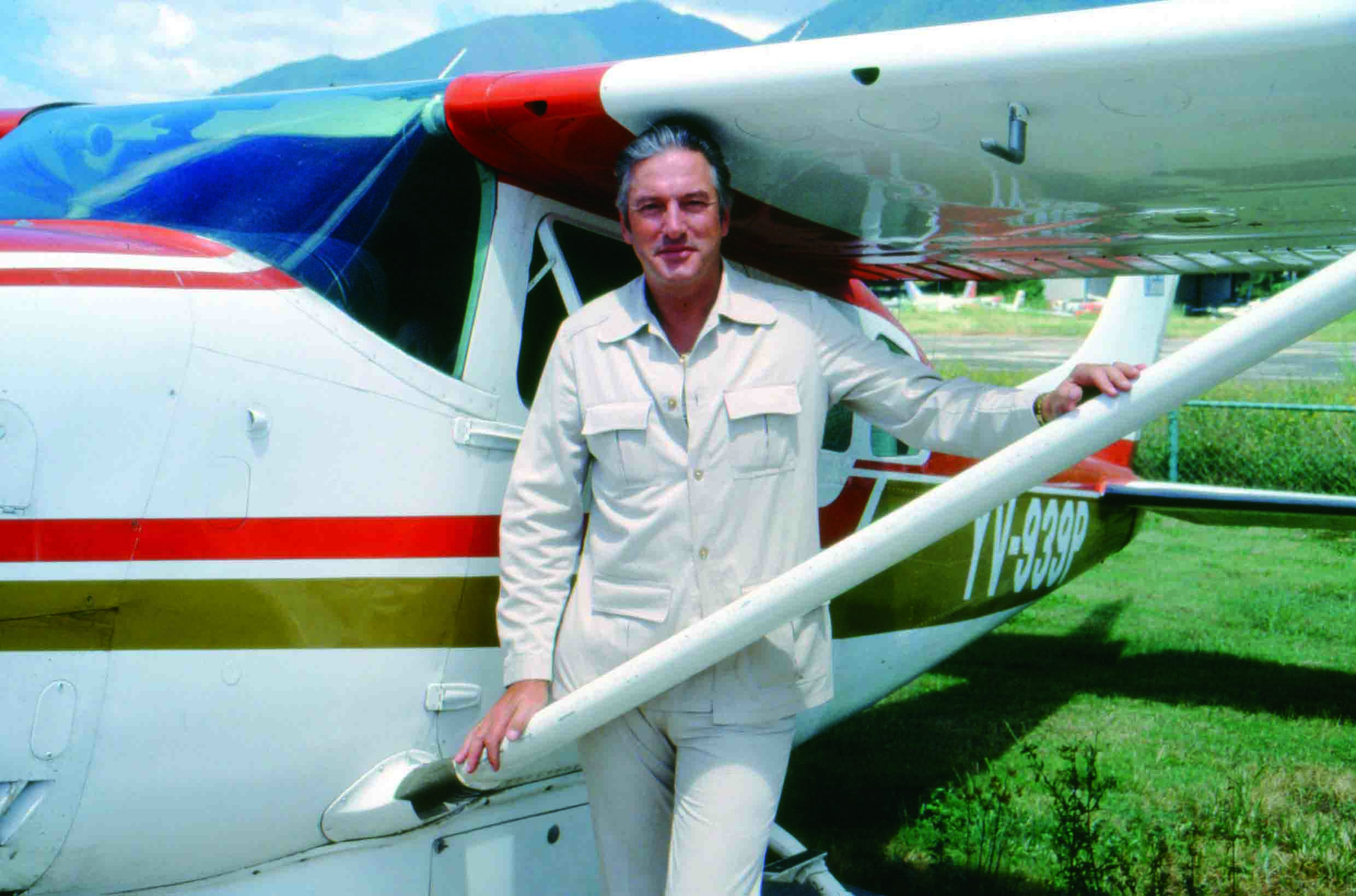
Pedro Trebbau

Trebbau was born in Cologne, where he very early on showed a keen interest in the natural world. He obtained a bachelor's degree in biology at the universities of Frankfurt and Freiburg, as well as a veterinary degree from the University of Giessen.

He arrived in Venezuela in 1953 and enrolled at the Faculty of Veterinary Medicine of the Central University of Venezuela (UCV), based in Maracay, Aragua. Shortly afterwards he decided to remain in Venezuela, and obtained Venezuelan nationality in 1957.

His work in Venezuela began as a technical director of El Pinar Zoo, in Caracas. Between 1965 and 1970 he also worked as a professor at the Institute of Tropical Zoology of the UCV. In 1968 he led an expedition and rescue operation in the region of Guayana that protected an estimated 10.000 animals of 53 different species that would have drowned as a result of the construction of the Guri Dam.

In 1974 Trebbau accomplished the endowment and foundation of the first modern zoo in Venezuela. Later called Caricuao Zoo, it was inaugurated in 1977 and Trebbau remained as its president until 1979. He then worked as the zoo coordinator for the National Parks Institute (Inparques), and as Special Commissioner for the Ministry of Environment. From 1980 to 1983 he was president of the Humboldt Cultural Association. In 1989 he took an active role on the advisory committee for a new Wildlife Law, and in 1991 he became president of the National Foundation of Zoological Parks and Aquariums.

Trebbau produced and hosted several TV programs aimed at the dissemination of the knowledge of the local fauna, especially among the younger generations. Among these Zoológico Infantil (Children's Zoo), La Fauna (The Wildlife) and Campamento en la Selva (Jungle Camp), were broadcast by the former National Television-Channel 5 and Venezolana de Televisión for several years.

His scientific research was widely published in technical journals around the world; but he was most proud of his role as a disseminator of the local knowledge of the fauna to the local population. For him, the entertainment role of zoos was always secondary to its role as an educational and research-producing institution.

His research and collaboration with the herpetologist Peter Pritchard produced the still-extant reference book on The Turtles of Venezuela.

On 16 January 2021, Radio Caracas Radio confirmed his death.
