= Colección La Fauna =

Book series

- Volume dedicated to the American crocodile.
- Authors: Pedro Trebbau; Eduardo Sánchez Rugeles (contributor)
- Illustrator: Leonardo Rodríguez
- Language: Spanish
- Subject: Fauna of Venezuela
- Publisher: Ediciones La Fauna KPT
- Publication date: 2019
- Publication place: Spain
- Media type: Print
- Pages: 24

Colección La Fauna (La Fauna Collection) is a series of books about the Fauna of Venezuela.

The first four titles were published in 2019 by Ediciones La Fauna KPT, based in Madrid.

The collection have as origin the studies by German-born, Venezuelan zoologist, Pedro Trebbau, along with the documentary research of Israel Cañizales and Salvador Boher. The adaptation of the texts were made by writer Eduardo Sánchez Rugeles.

The illustrations were made by the artist Leonardo Rodríguez.

The editorial director of the collection is Miriam Ardizzone, the art direction is in charge of Manuel González Ruiz

== History ==
The collection is part of the project for rescue of the scientific works of Pedro Trebbau, initiated with the re-edition of the book The Turtles of Venezuela (2018), as well of the publication of the biography Trebbau: Maestro por naturaleza (2018), by Albor Rodríguez.

Trebbau is known for the promotion and preservation of Venezuelan wildlife and nature.

== Titles ==
ISBN	Name
978-84-09-09108-9	American crocodile
978-84-09-09107-2	Harpy eagle
978-84-09-09106-5	Anteater
978-84-09-10689-9	Ocelot
