= Captivity =

Situation of being confined to a space

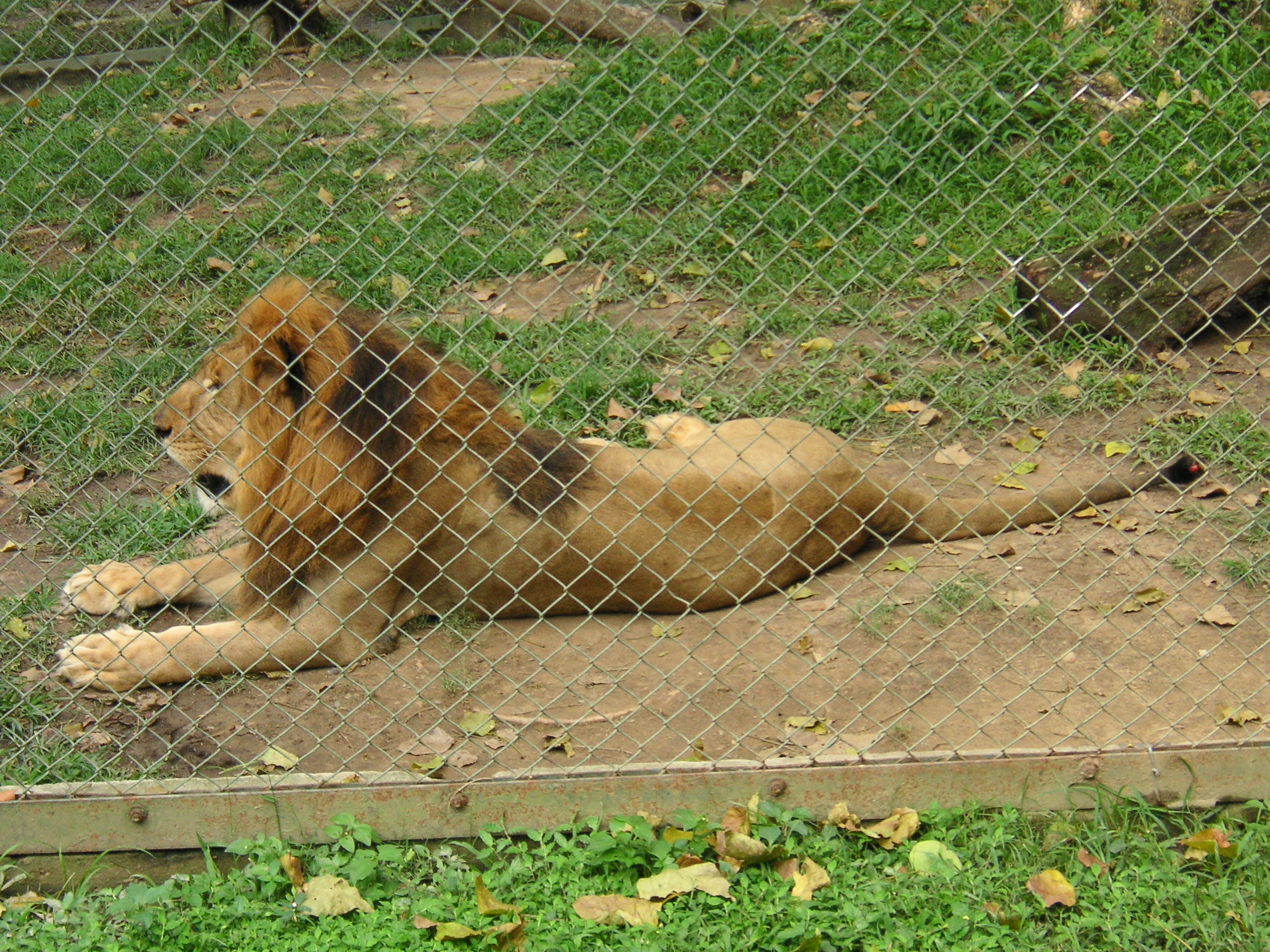
A lion in captivity at the Caricuao Zoo in Caracas

Captivity, or being held captive, is a state wherein humans or other animals are confined to a particular space and prevented from leaving or moving freely. An example in humans is imprisonment. Prisoners of war are usually held in captivity by a government hostile to their own. Animals are held in captivity in zoos, and often as pets and as livestock.

== Definition and scope ==
Captivity is the state of being captive, of being imprisoned or confined. The word derives from the late Middle English captivitas, and the Latin captivus and capere, meaning to seize or take, which is also the root of the English word, "capture".

In humans, captivity may include arrest and detention as a function of law enforcement and a civilian correctional system, detention of combatants in a time of war, as well as human trafficking, slave taking, and other forms of involuntary confinement, forced relocation, and servitude. In non-human animals, captivity may include confinement for the purpose of food production or labor, such as that done on a farm, confinement for the purpose of human recreation or education, such as that done at a zoo or aquarium, or confinement for the purpose of keeping domesticated pets, such as that commonly done with animals such as the house cat or the dog. In relation to non-living objects, captivity may describe the state of having control, whether that be control of one person over an object, such as "capturing a piece" in the game of chess, the control of a group over an area, such as the "capture" of a fort or city during a time of war, or control exercised by one object over another, such as one celestial body being "captured" by the gravitational pull of another, or a "captive balloon" which is tethered to the ground by a rope or string.

In a philosophical sense, captivity may refer not simply to confinement or lack of individual freedom, but also to the nature of a relationship between the captive and the captor, characterized by a lack of self-direction and autonomy. "Although the paradigm case of captivity is a free person who is held against her will by another, the existence of captive children and animals makes it clear that the denial of autonomy as it is usually understood is not a condition for captivity". In some instances, the captivity of the subject is clear, as with an animal kept in a cage at a zoo. However, circumstances exist under which captivity is more amorphous. For example, it has been noted that it is hard to say whether members of a rhinoceros family kept in a thousand-acre enclosure within their normal area of habitation, for purposes of insuring their preservation, are really in captivity.

Captivity may also be employed in more abstract or figurative senses, such as to captivate, meaning to subdue through charm, or to capture such as an artist attempting to "capture a mood", or "capture a scene".

== In humans ==
=== Arrest and incarceration ===
Humans are held captive under the authority of their own government for a number of different reasons. Under certain circumstances, a person suspected of committing a crime is subject to detention for a period of time while awaiting trial for that crime. In some cases, a person may be detained and then released without being charged with criminal wrongdoing. Persons convicted of a crime may sent to a prison.

According to the Institute for Criminal Policy Research at the University of London, as of 2016 an estimated 10.35 million people were imprisoned worldwide.

=== In warfare ===
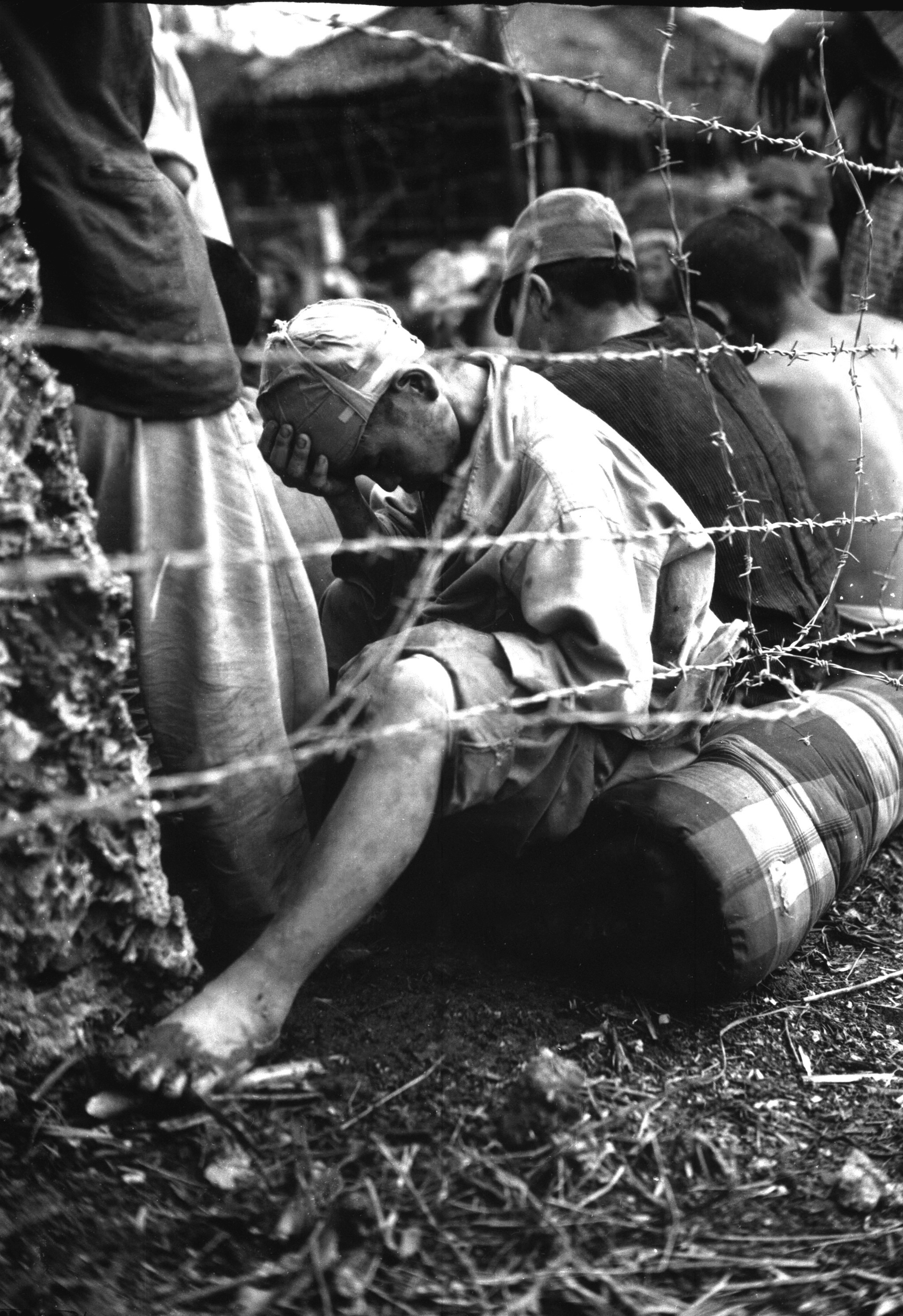
Japanese soldiers captured during the Battle of Okinawa

Throughout human history, the practice of "captive taking" during war was commonly practiced. Those taken from the defeated group, most often women and children, would typically be enslaved, sold into slavery to others, forced to marry members of the victorious group, or held in permanent sexual captivity. The first Roman gladiators, for example, were prisoners of war. The taking of captives may have been a byproduct, but was also often a primary goal of conducting raids and warfare in small scale societies. According to some estimates of ancient societies, war captives and slaves may have at various points comprised as much as 20% of Roman Italy, 33% of Greece, 70% of Korea, 20% of some Islamic states, 40% of tropical American societies, (Note: if servants and tributary groups are included) and as much as half of some African societies. The practice of conducting raids for captive taking extended in some forms until modern times, for example, piracy in the Mediterranean Sea and the taking of captives to be sold as slaves continued until the 19th century, when it eventually culminated in the Barbary Wars.

Over time, nations found it to be in their interests to agree to international standards regarding the treatment of captured soldiers. The 1648 Peace of Westphalia, which ended the Thirty Years' War, established that prisoners of war should be released without ransom at the end of hostilities and that they should be allowed to return to their homelands. Chapter II of the Annex to the 1907 Hague Convention IV – The Laws and Customs of War on Land covered the treatment of prisoners of war in detail. These provisions were further expanded in the 1929 Geneva Convention on the Prisoners of War and were largely revised in the Third Geneva Convention in 1949. Article 4 of the Third Geneva Convention protects captured military personnel, some guerrilla fighters, and certain civilians. It applies from the moment a prisoner is captured until he or she is released or repatriated. One of the main provisions of the convention makes it illegal to torture prisoners and states that a prisoner can only be required to give their name, date of birth, rank and service number (if applicable).

In some wars, such as the First World War, the conditions of captivity were separated between camps for prisoners of war, and those for civilian internment. Some wars have seen mass wartime imprisonment. In addition to enemy military personnel, the Nazi regime imprisoned large numbers of private citizens based on their ethnicity, culture, or political views, as part of the regime's efforts to impose a vision of ethnic purity. Many millions were killed, or died of starvation or disease. (Note: Alternatively, as many as three million German POWs may have died in Allied custody following the surrender of Germany.) In the United States, citizens of Japanese descent were imprisoned out of fear that their loyalty would be to the Japanese enemy.

=== Economic captivity ===
Humans have historically been subjected to a range of economic based captivity. In the extreme are various forms of slavery, such as the chattel slavery of the Americas, which utilized a monopoly of violence along with the power of the government to commandeer the labor of African Americans, Native Americans, and the indigenous people of Latin America and the Caribbean. Beyond but in many ways similar to slavery, many in colonial times regardless of ethnicity found captivity in the form of indentured servitude, impressed into forced labor until their debts could be paid. Alternatively, although the practice of slavery had since been abolished, many natives found themselves otherwise held captive, such as the internment of the Navajo in the American southwest in the 1860s, in part to force a transition to the life of sedentary Christian farmers.

In modern times, in what has been termed the prison–industrial complex, inmates, otherwise already subjected to captivity in terms of restriction of movement, may also be subjected to economic exploitation, through forced labor at little or no compensation. (Note: This practice may itself in some ways also be traced back to the institution of slavery, for example, in the reconstruction era in the United States, where large amounts of forced labor was sourced to recently freed blacks, who rather than being enslaved per se, were charged with petty crimes and then forced to work as prisoners.) Alternatively, as Karen M. Morin examines, undocumented immigrants, neither prisoners nor slaves, have in instances been historically subjected to similar conditions, both in terms of freedom of movement as well as freedom of labor.

Others have examined economic captivity as it related to varying levels of inequality in developed societies. For example, George P. Smith II and Matthew Saunig examined the concept of economic captivity as it related to housing discrimination.

==== Human trafficking ====
Globally, it has been estimated that between 21 and 35.8 million people are victims of trafficking for sexual or labor exploitation, around two-thirds of them women and girls. The issue has been addressed variously at the national level, and internationally with the Protocol to Prevent, Suppress and Punish Trafficking in Persons, Especially Women and Children. However, many countries have no standing laws against trafficking, and of those that do, an estimated 16% of those studies had no convictions under their laws.

=== False imprisonment ===
False imprisonment is the legal term for an instance of a person being held captive without the authority of the state. It includes kidnapping and hostage taking, practices which date at least to Biblical times, with an Old Testament formal prohibition given in Exodus 21:16. These practices continue to the modern day, and are a common tactic used by terrorist or criminal organizations as a means of gaining power or for monetary extortion. The majority of kidnappings occur among the local populations in developing countries, with the majority occurring in Latin America. According to estimates in 2001 and 2005, global prevalence of kidnapping may be as many as 10,000 instances annually, and revenue gained from kidnapping world wide may be as much as $500 million.

The definition of false imprisonment also goes beyond kidnapping and hostage taking situations, to include circumstances under which a person is held captive under a fraudulent assertion of authority. For example, if a police officer were to detain a person in their patrol car for a short period of time without a legally justifiable reason, that brief captivity would still constitute false imprisonment.

=== Effects of captivity ===
For individuals who are kidnapped or taken hostage, victims may experience effects similar to many other traumatic experiences, such as acute stress disorder and Posttraumatic stress disorder. One such condition unique to captivity is Stockholm syndrome, wherein the captive comes to feel dependence on, and even affection for, their captor. These alliances, resulting from a bond formed between captor and captives during intimate time spent together, are generally considered irrational in light of the danger or risk endured by the victims. The FBI's Hostage Barricade Database System and Law Enforcement Bulletin shows that roughly 8% of victims show evidence of Stockholm syndrome.

== In animals ==
Swiss biologist Heini Hediger noted that "[m]an's first efforts to keep wild animals in captivity date back to prehistoric times". Hediger proposed that the human practice of keeping animals in captivity went through three stages, with the first stage having religious motivations, the second being for utility and entertainment, and the third being for scientific study.

=== Pets ===
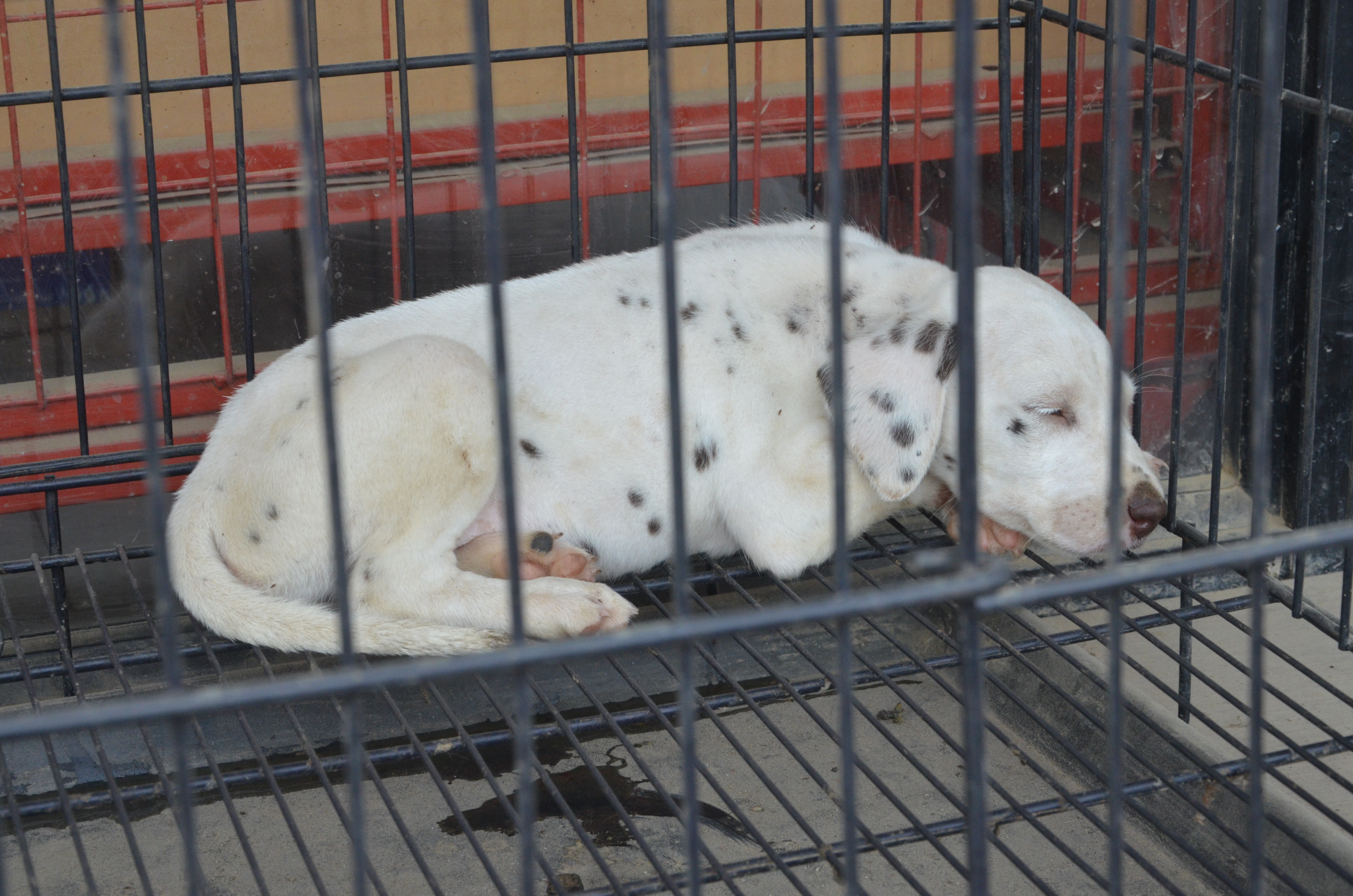
A dog in a cage

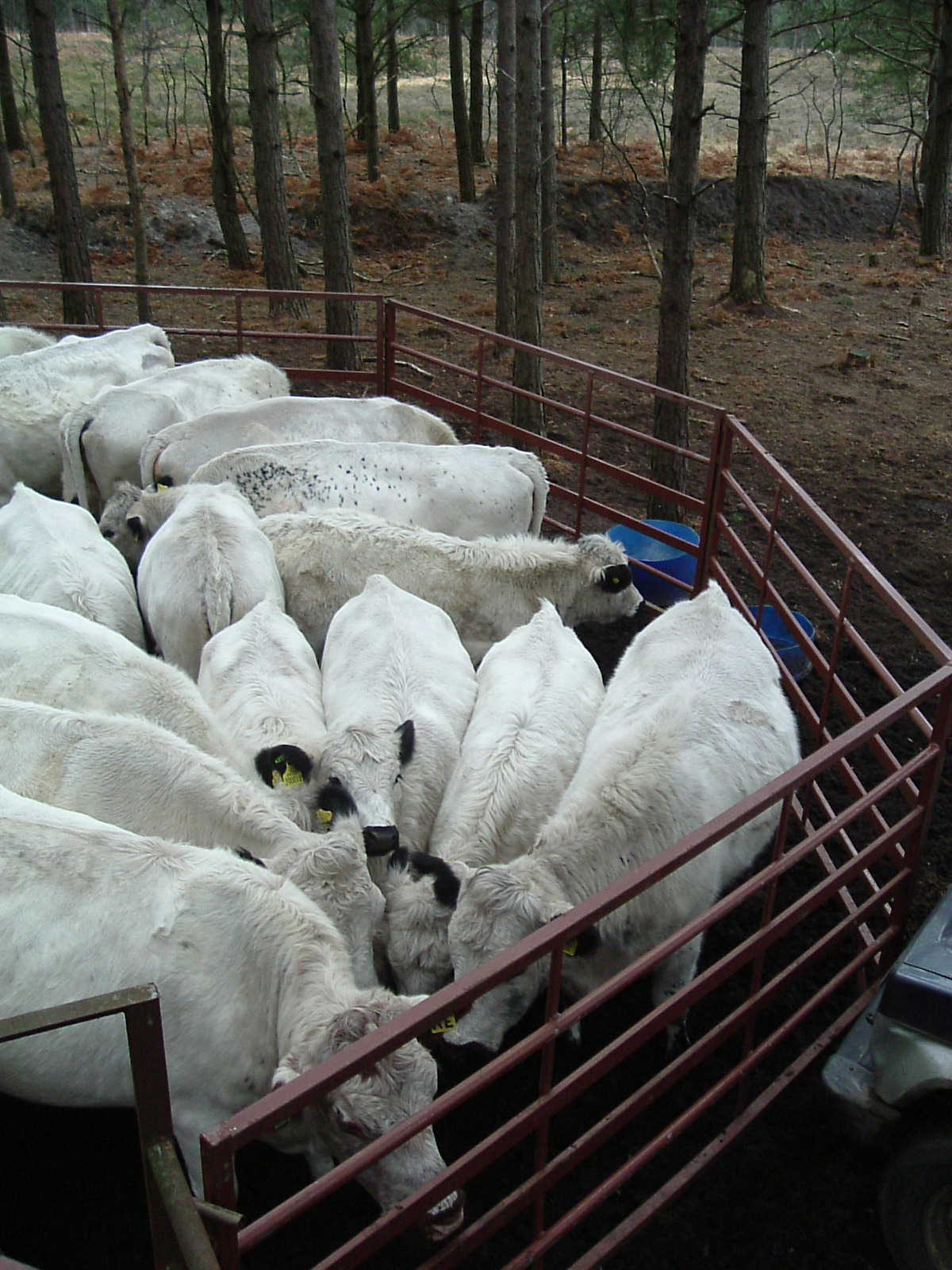
Cattle in a pen

In examining domesticated pets, researcher Alexandra Horowitz describes the plight of dogs as being constitutionally captive. That is, in comparison with the captivity of wild species, the human captivity of the dog over the course of tens of thousands of years has designed a species where there is no longer any natural state other than captivity. While there may be free-ranging dogs or feral dogs, there is no longer any truly wild dog belonging to the species Canis familiaris. For the domesticated dog, many breeds are captives of their own bodies, often designed through selective breeding to achieve human objectives not related to well-being or health, and which may result in disfiguring, painful, or fatal diseases. Individual dogs are also captive to humans in terms of restrictions to their physical freedom of movement, their freedom of sexuality and reproduction, as well as limited self-direction in terms of diet, socialization, and elimination. However, Horowitz writes, dogs are species-captive, and "a dog who is not species-captive would not be a dog at all". They are a species so deeply domesticated that freedom has no meaning, and for whom their status as a captive species mitigates their captivity.

=== Effects of captivity on animals ===
Captivity "benefits the captor, and in almost all cases, harms the captive". The degree to which captivity affects animals is dictated in large part by whether they were born in wild and then captured, or born in captivity: "The problem of the animal bred in captivity is in one respect obviously simpler than that of one born wild; the abrupt, decisive change from freedom to captivity is absent. No rupture with an existing environment, entailing laborious re-creation of a fresh One, arises".

== In popular culture ==
Captivity and efforts to endure or escape it are popular themes in literature. The captivity narrative is a genre of stories about people being captured by "uncivilized" enemies. A famous example is the Babylonian captivity of Judah, as described in the Bible. Attempts to escape from prison are a popular genre in prison films and prisoner-of-war films, with films in the genres often depicting the captive as a heroic figure, often an innocent person who is wrongly convicted and seeking to escape the evil or abuses of the captors. For example, the films are said to perpetuate "a common misperception that most correctional officers are abusive" and that prisoners are "violent and beyond redemption."

== See also ==
- Captive company – a subsidiary
- Coercion
- Hostile takeover
- Human trafficking
- Slavery
- State capture – a type of systemic political corruption in which private interests significantly influence a state's decision-making processes to their own advantage
