= El Pinar Zoo =

El Pinar Zoo Parque Zoológico El Pinar
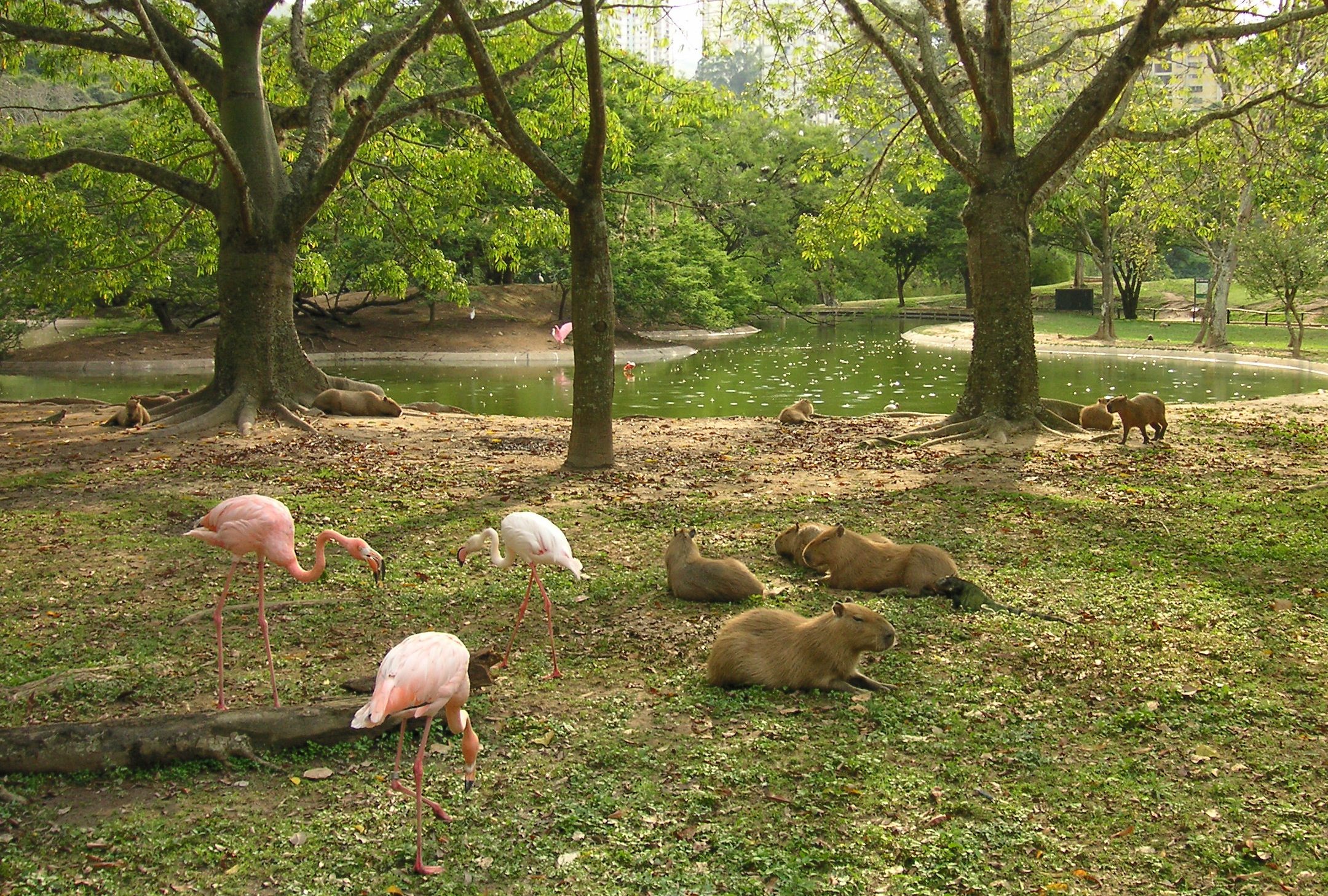
- Interactive map of El Pinar Zoo; Parque Zoológico El Pinar
- 10°28′47″N 66°56′21″W
- Date opened: 1945
- Location: Caracas, Venezuela

The El Pinar Zoo (Spanish: Parque Zoológico El Pinar) Also Zoological Park of El Pinar Is the first zoological garden of Caracas, Venezuela inaugurated 13 August 1945 under the presidency of Isaías Medina Angarita. El pinar zoo is located in El Paraiso Parish in the former grounds of the La Vaquera hacienda, which was owned by Juan Vicente Gómez. The State took possession of it in 1935. It occupies an area of 7 hectares.

The Park has the "Ecological Brigade" program, which is composed of young people interested in the care of animals and their habitat, who act as guides of the park, help visitors and ensure that they comply with the standards from the park.

Highlights include Jaguars, monkeys, crocodiles, peacocks, ducks among other animals

== Gallery ==
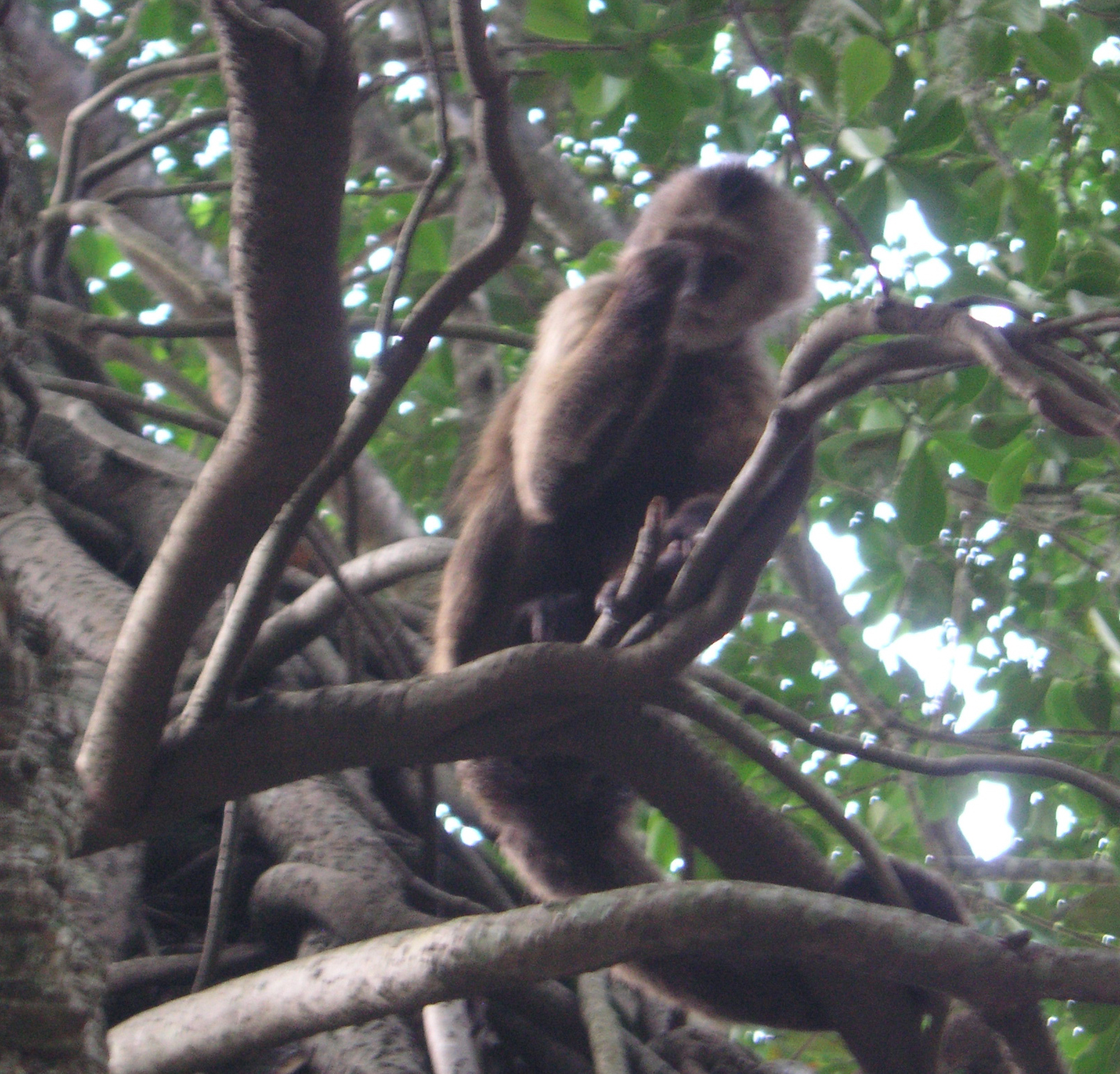

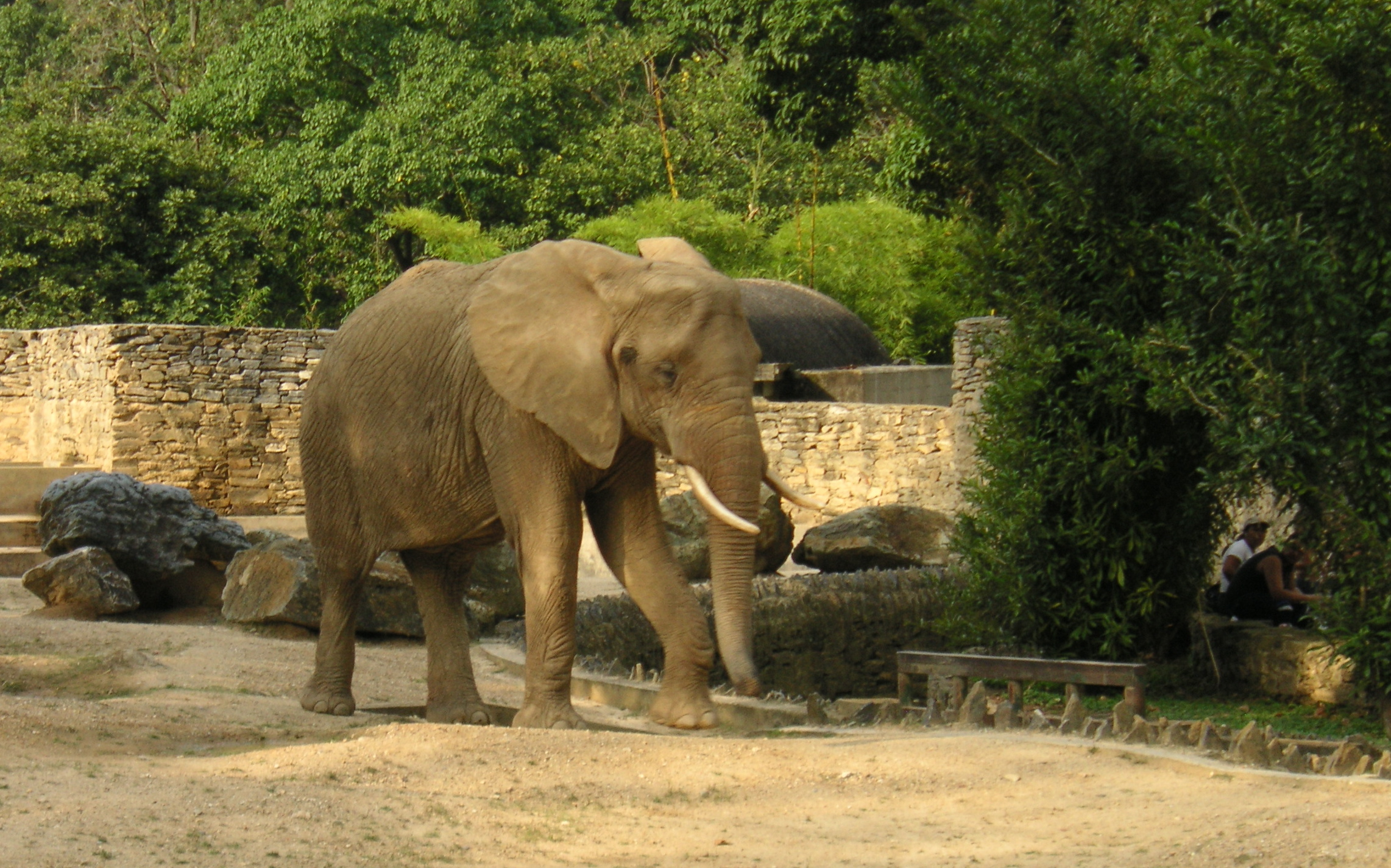

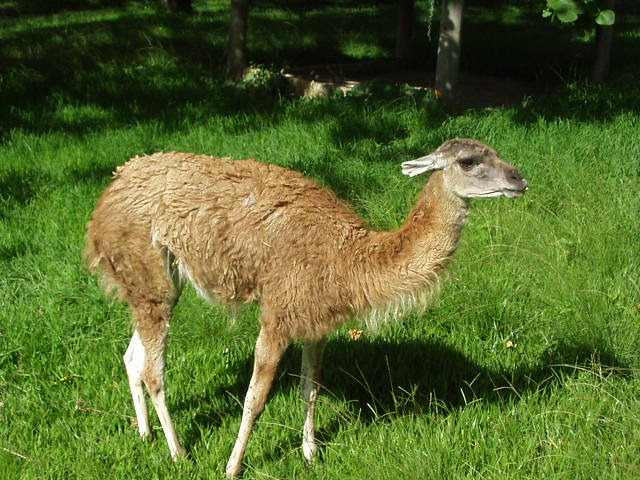

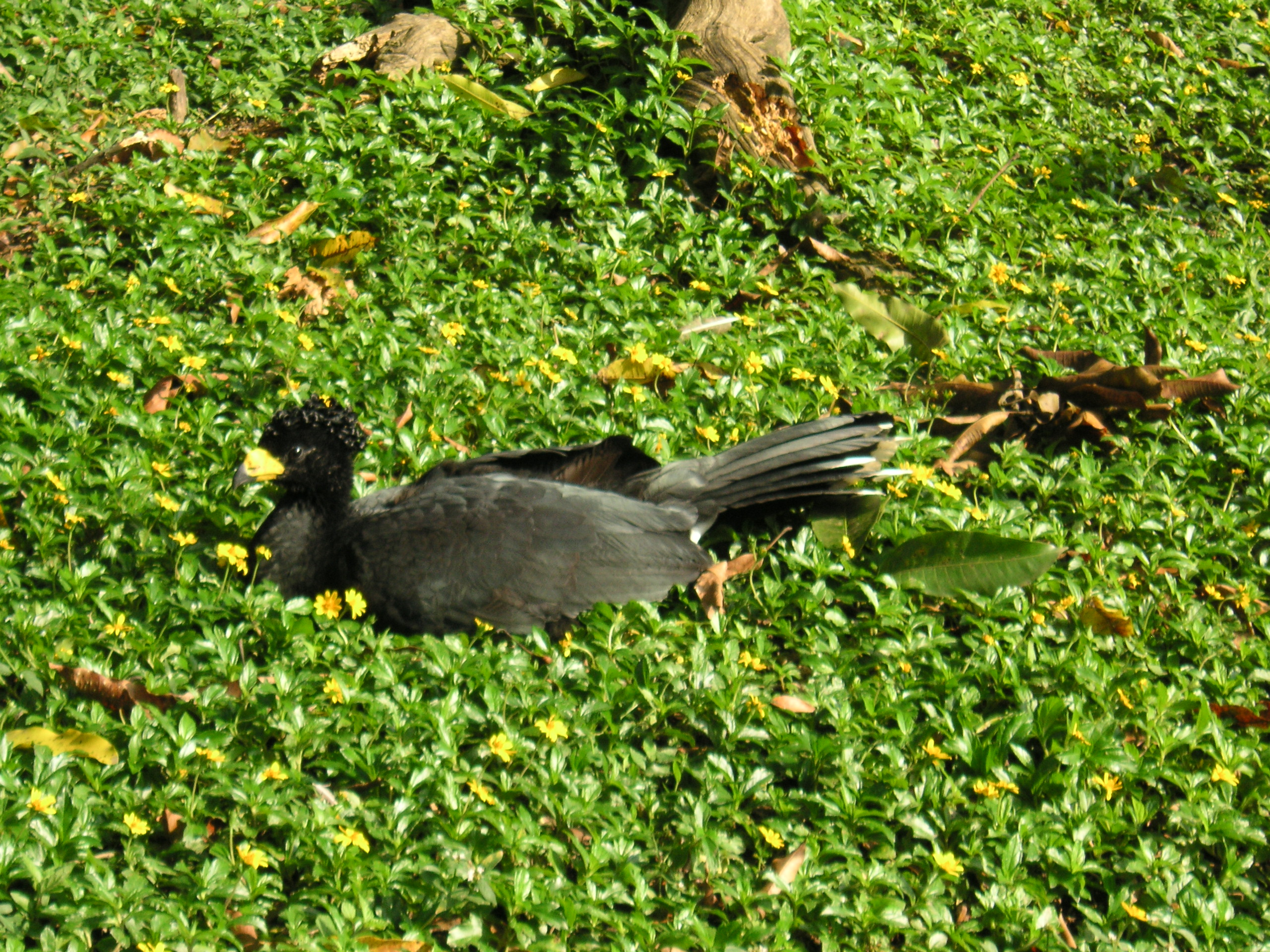

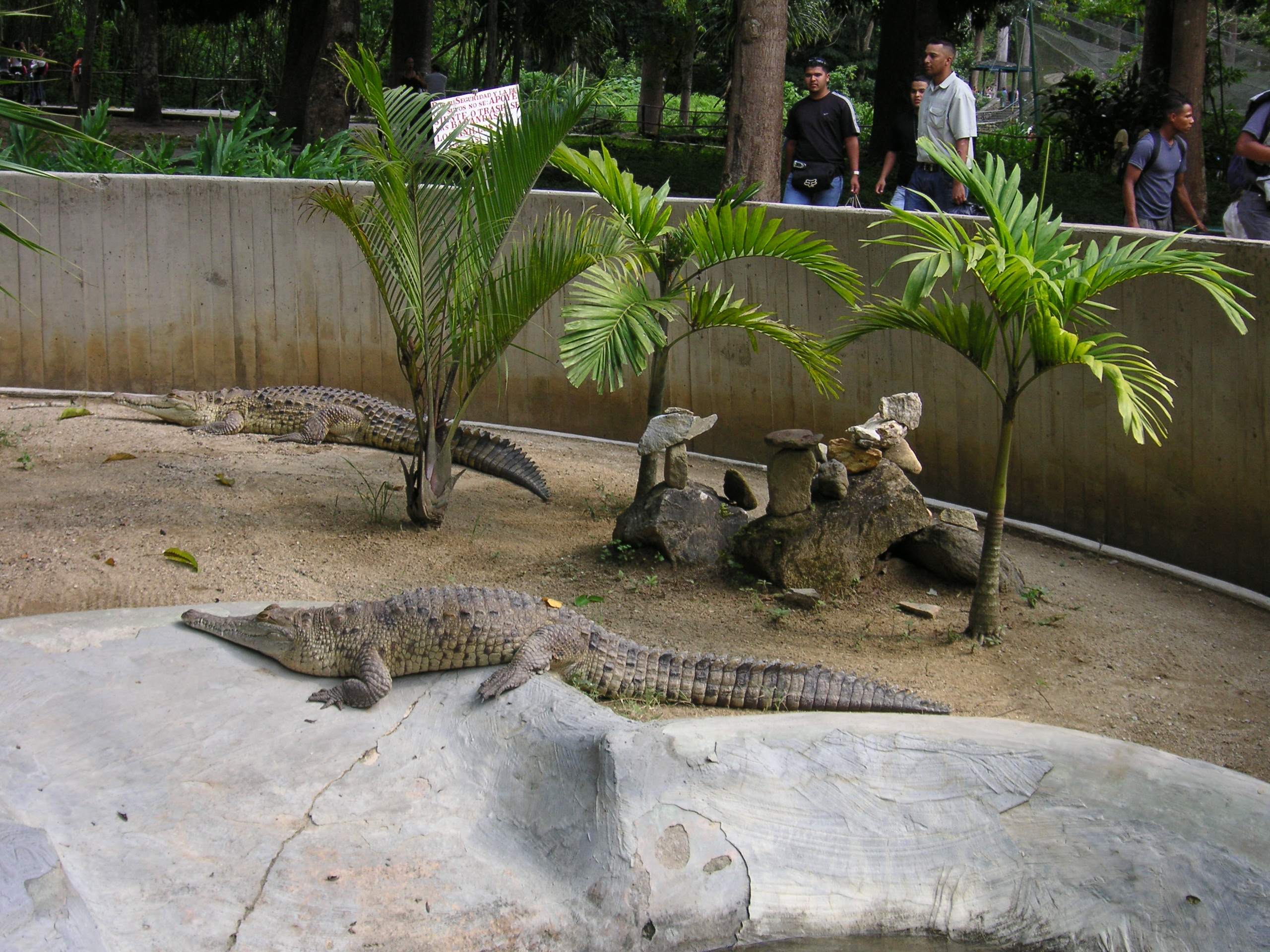

== See also ==
- List of national parks of Venezuela
- La Laguna Zoo
