= La Laguna Zoo =

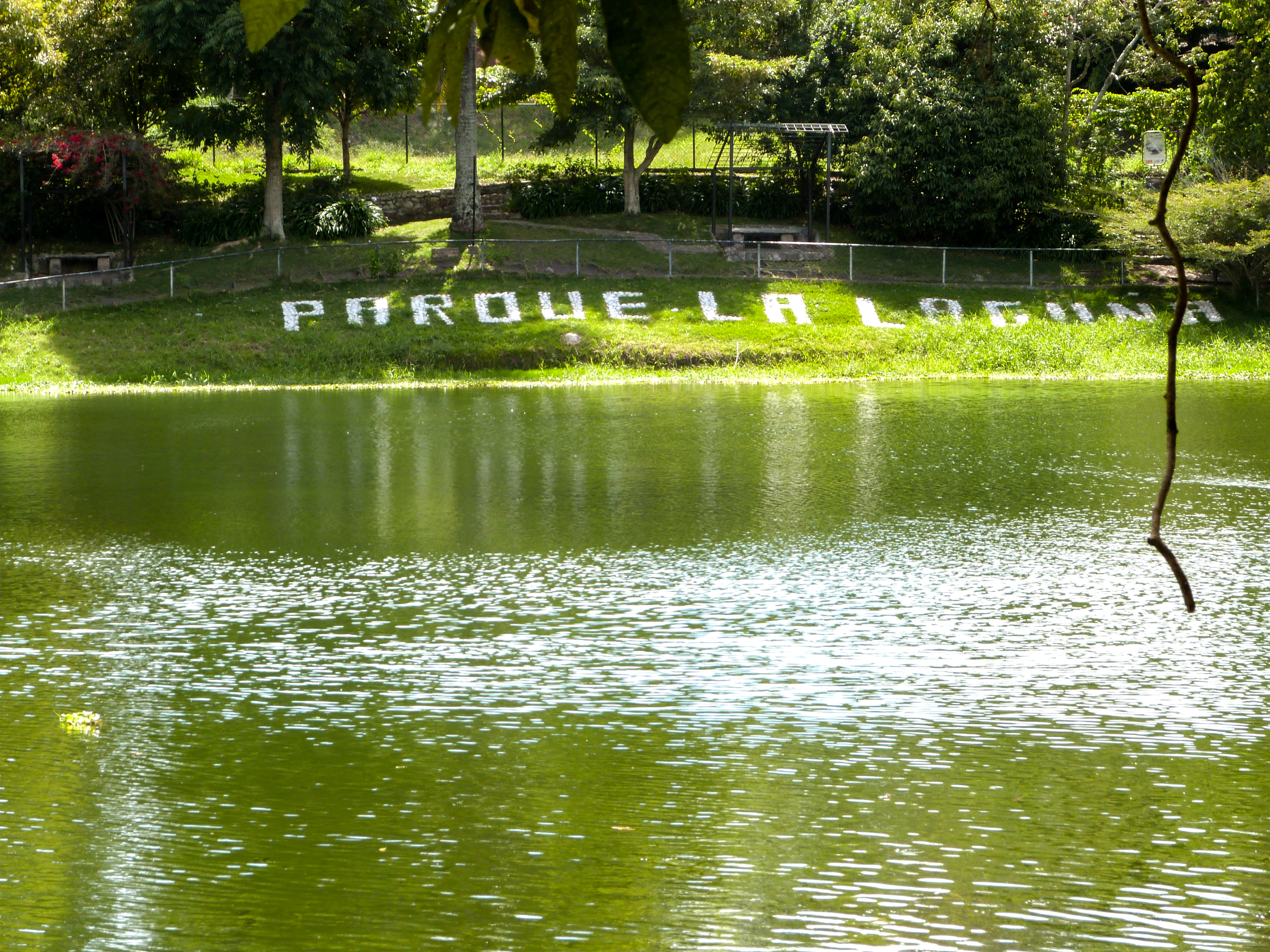
- Interactive map of La Laguna Zoo
- 7°49′24″N 72°18′57″W
- Date opened: 1955
- Location: Capacho Nuevo, Venezuela
- Land area: 1.4 hectares

The La Laguna Zoo (Spanish: Parque zoológico La Laguna; Zoológico de Capacho) Also Zoological Park of La Laguna Is a zoological garden located in the town of Capacho Nuevo, near the city of San Cristóbal, in the Municipality Independencia of the State Táchira, in the Andes to the west of the South American country of Venezuela.

It is the third oldest zoo in Venezuela, created in 1955, has 1.4 hectares and is managed by the government of the Municipality of Independencia since 2001. Its main attraction is the Bear Frontino. It has a natural lagoon and up to 32 species of different animals.

== See also ==
- List of national parks of Venezuela
- Chorros de Milla Zoo

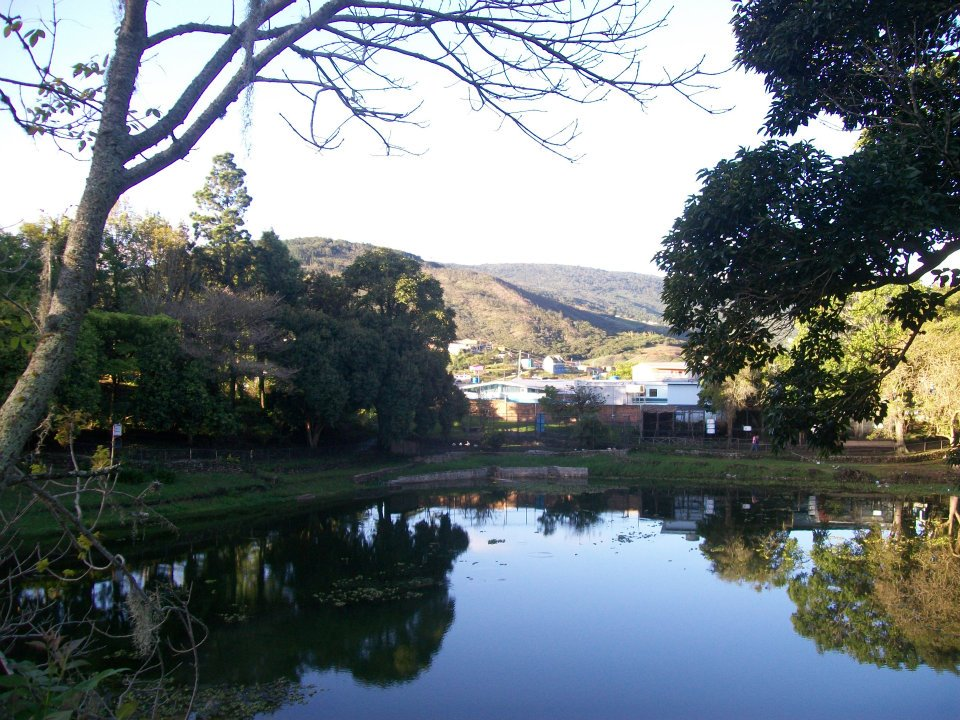
Another View
