= The Turtles of Venezuela =

1984 guide by Pedro Trebbau and Peter C.H. Pritchard

- Bookcover of the 2018 Spanish edition
- Author: Pedro Trebbau and Peter C.H. Pritchard
- Illustrator: Giorgio Voltolina
- Language: English
- Series: Number 2. Contributions to herpetology
- Subject: Venezuelan turtles
- Genre: Zoology Books
- Publisher: Society for the Study of Amphibians and Reptiles
- Publication date: 1984
- Publication place: Venezuela
- Media type: Print (Hardcover)
- Pages: 403
- OCLC: 11490819
- Dewey Decimal: 597.92/0987
- LC Class: QL666.C5 P853 1984

The Turtles of Venezuela is an identification guide of the Testudines families that are found in Venezuela, written by zoologist Pedro Trebbau and herpetologist Peter Pritchard. It was originally published in English in 1984, by the Society for the Study of Amphibians and Reptiles as the Number 2 of the series Contributions to herpetology.

In 2016 was published the Spanish version by Oscar Todtmann Editores, with more than 130 pictures and illustrations, a presentation by Ph.D. Carlos Rivero Blanco and a prologue by Ph.D. Vivian Pérez.

A new edition was presented in 2018 by Editorial La Fauna, in Madrid, Spain. It features a dedication to conservationist Saúl Gutiérrez Eijuri (1960-2012), and essays by Jorge Carrillo and Marcelo Sánchez-Villagra, about turtles in the Venezuelan fossil record.

At the website of Editorial La Fauna publishing, we can find this review:

This book outlines the general characteristics of the turtles of Venezuela, their geographic distribution, habitat, food sources, reproduction, use and conservation status. After extensive field research, Trebbau and Pritchard have put together this document for readers, as a tool aimed at establishing more effective research and conservation strategies and initiatives for the species and their families. Venezuela y sus Tortugas is an essential book for understanding and assessing the wildlife and turtles of Venezuela.
