= Chorros de Milla Zoo =

Chorros de Milla Zoo Parque Zoológico Chorros de Milla
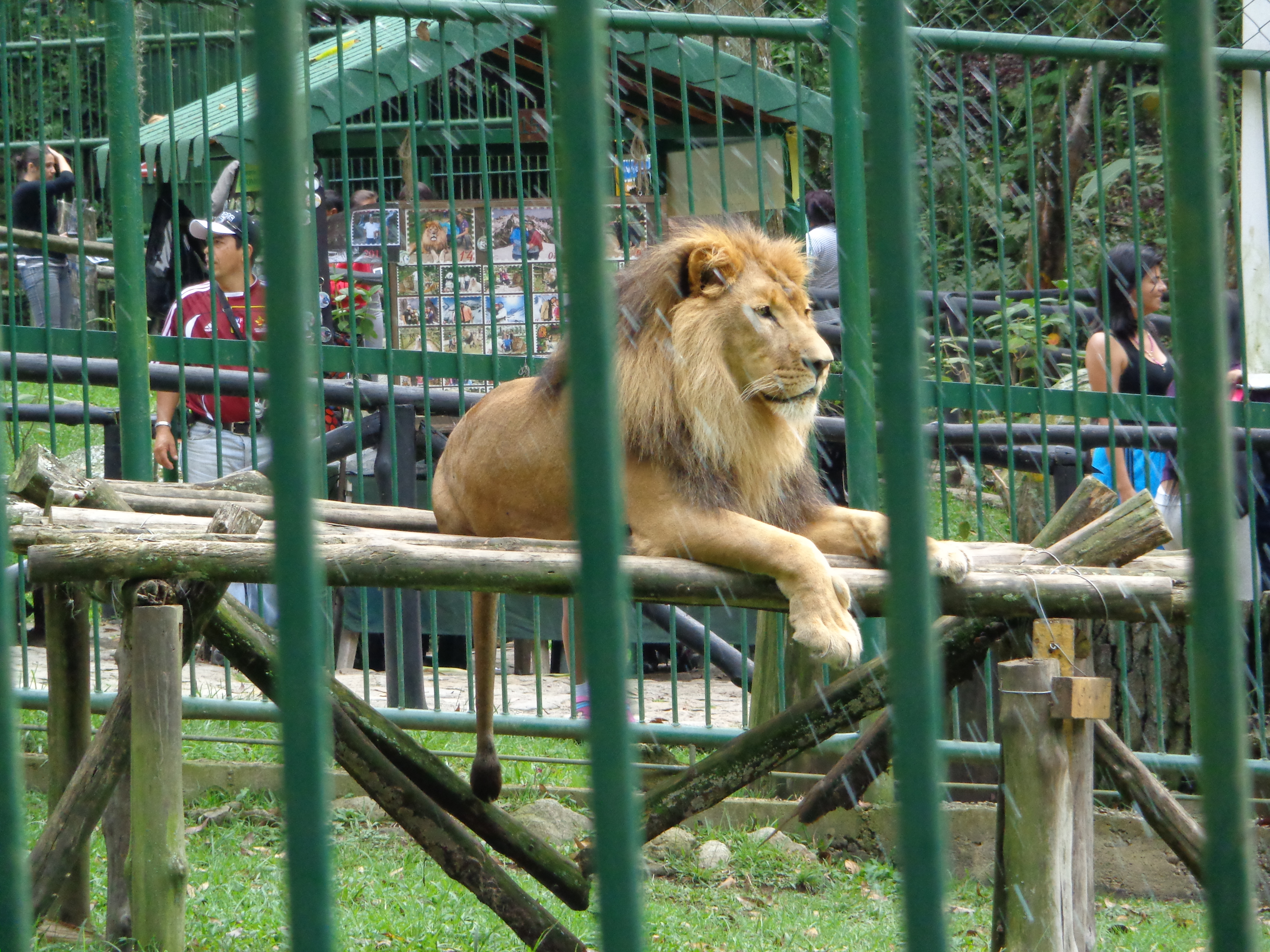
- Interactive map of Chorros de Milla Zoo; Parque Zoológico Chorros de Milla
- 8°37′55″N 71°08′46″W
- Date opened: 1958
- Location: Mérida, Venezuela

The Chorros de Milla Zoo (Spanish: Parque Zoológico Chorros de Milla) also Zoological Park of Chorros de Milla, is an urban zoological garden located in the northeastern end of the city of Mérida, Venezuela with native species of the Andean region and Venezuela. The Mérida Zoo was built in 1958 and is open to the public Tuesday to Sunday from 8:00 a.m. to 6:00 p.m.

Currently, the Chorros de Milla Zoological Park counts on the support of the Cleveland Metroparks Zoo in the United States, which provides technical support in staff training, educational programs, equipment acquisition, and wildlife management in captivity.

It is located in a valley that continues with the Cordillera de Mérida through Páramo Los Conejos, where the waters of the Milla River are born. A short distance in the north end of the park, the river Milla is transformed into a beautiful waterfall, which is one of the attractions of the park. In addition to the animals, the zoo has artificial lagoons, stairways, paths, kiosks, picnic spaces and about 2000 species of plants.

== Gallery ==
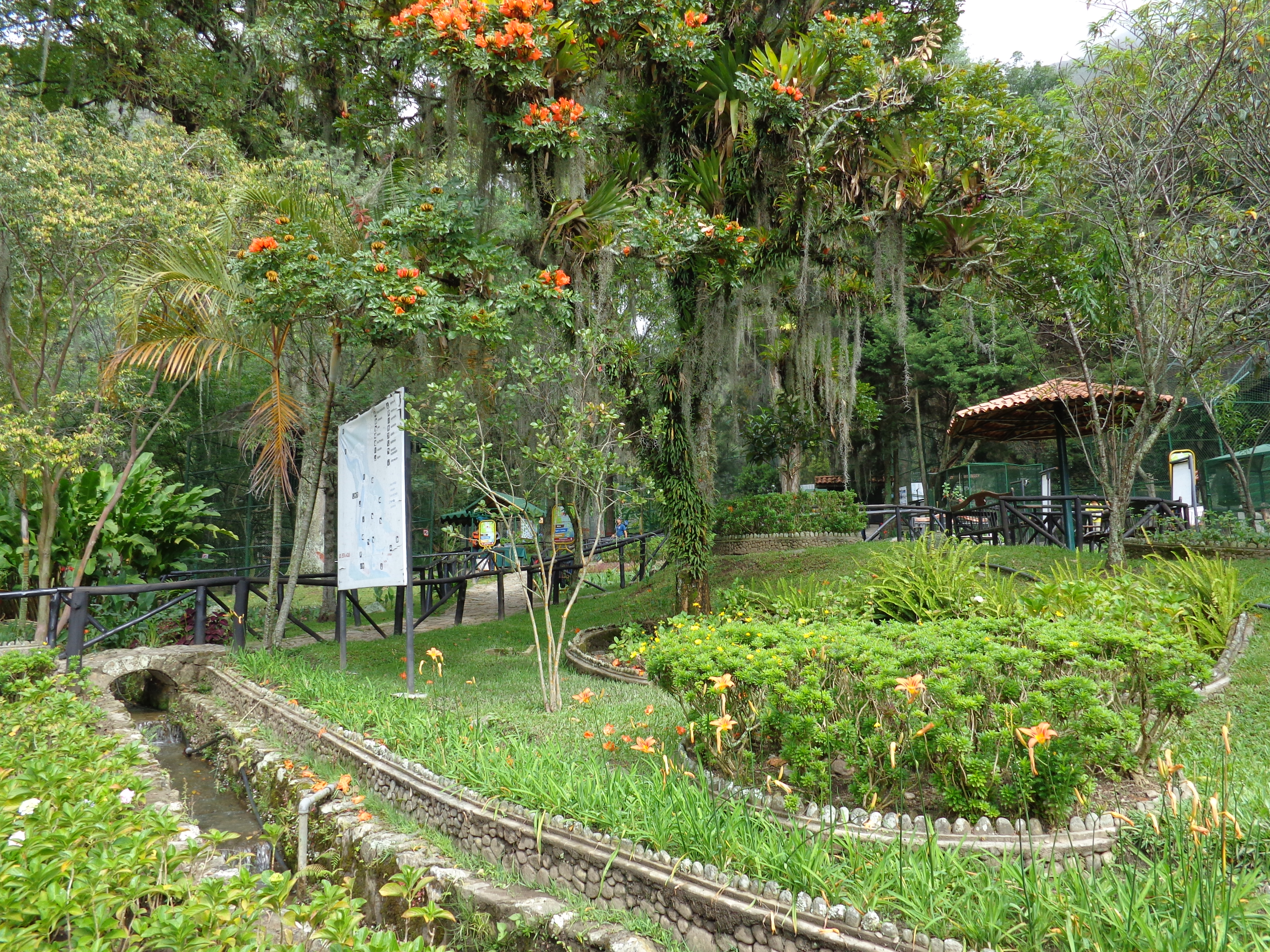

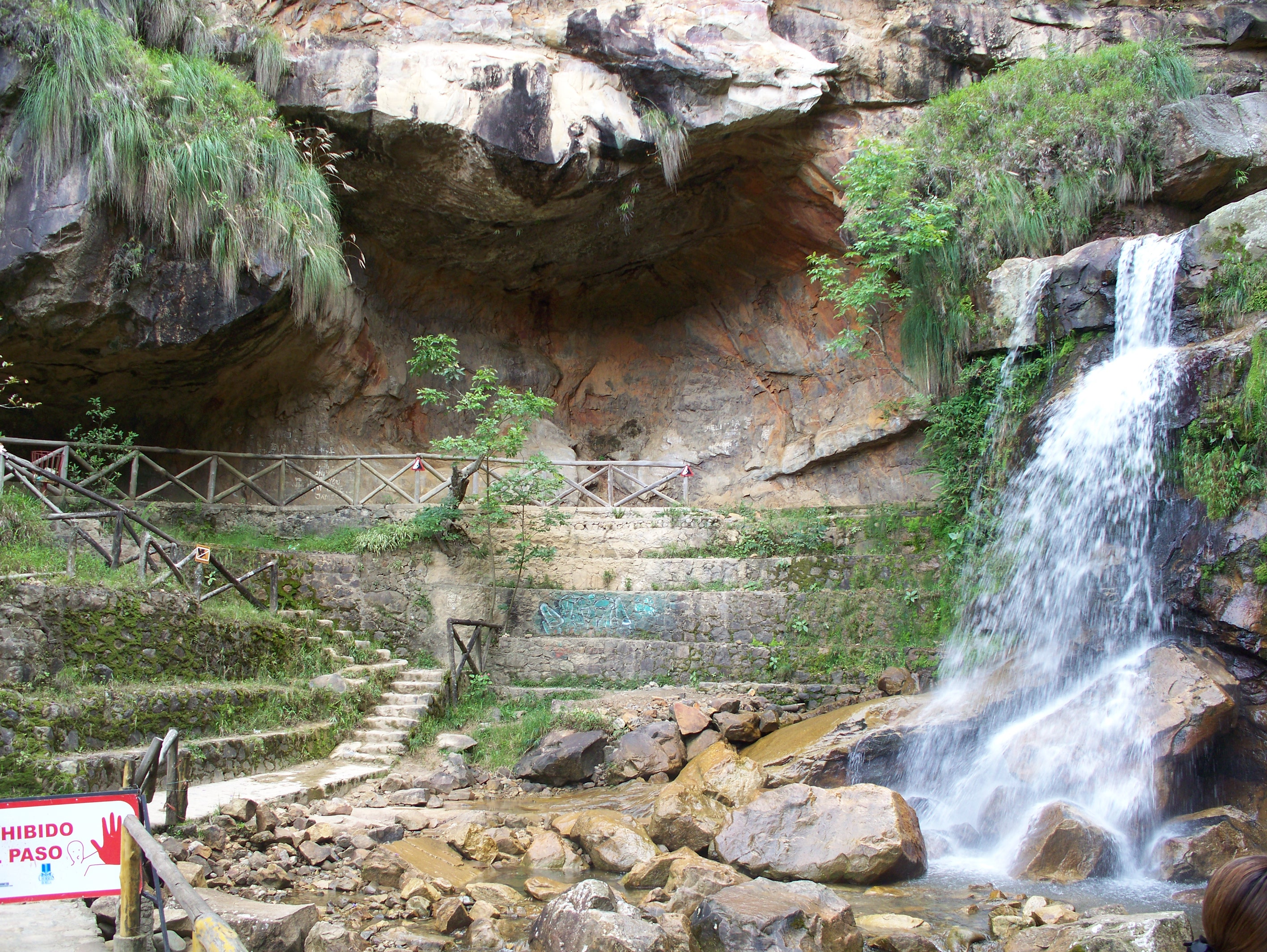

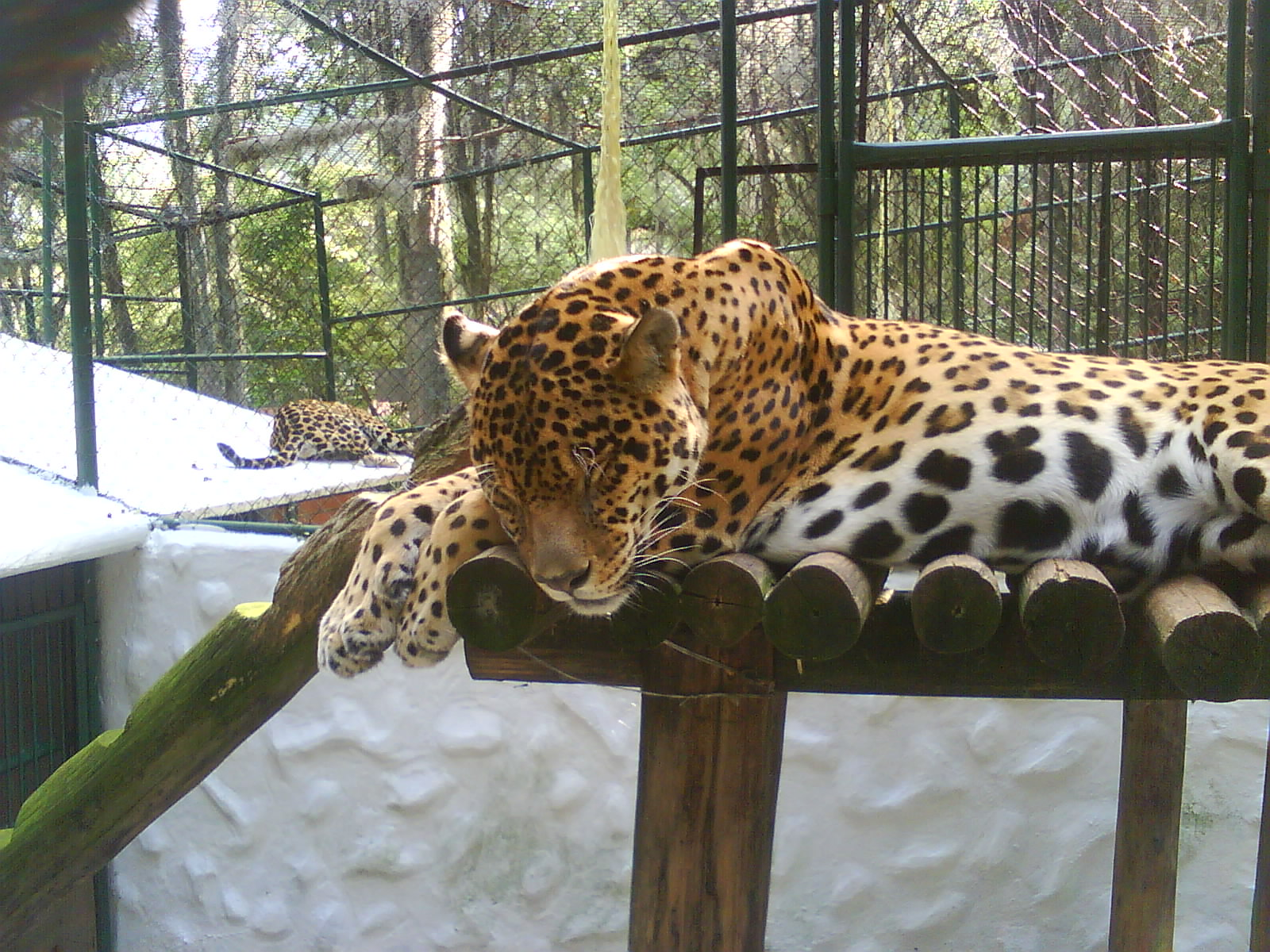

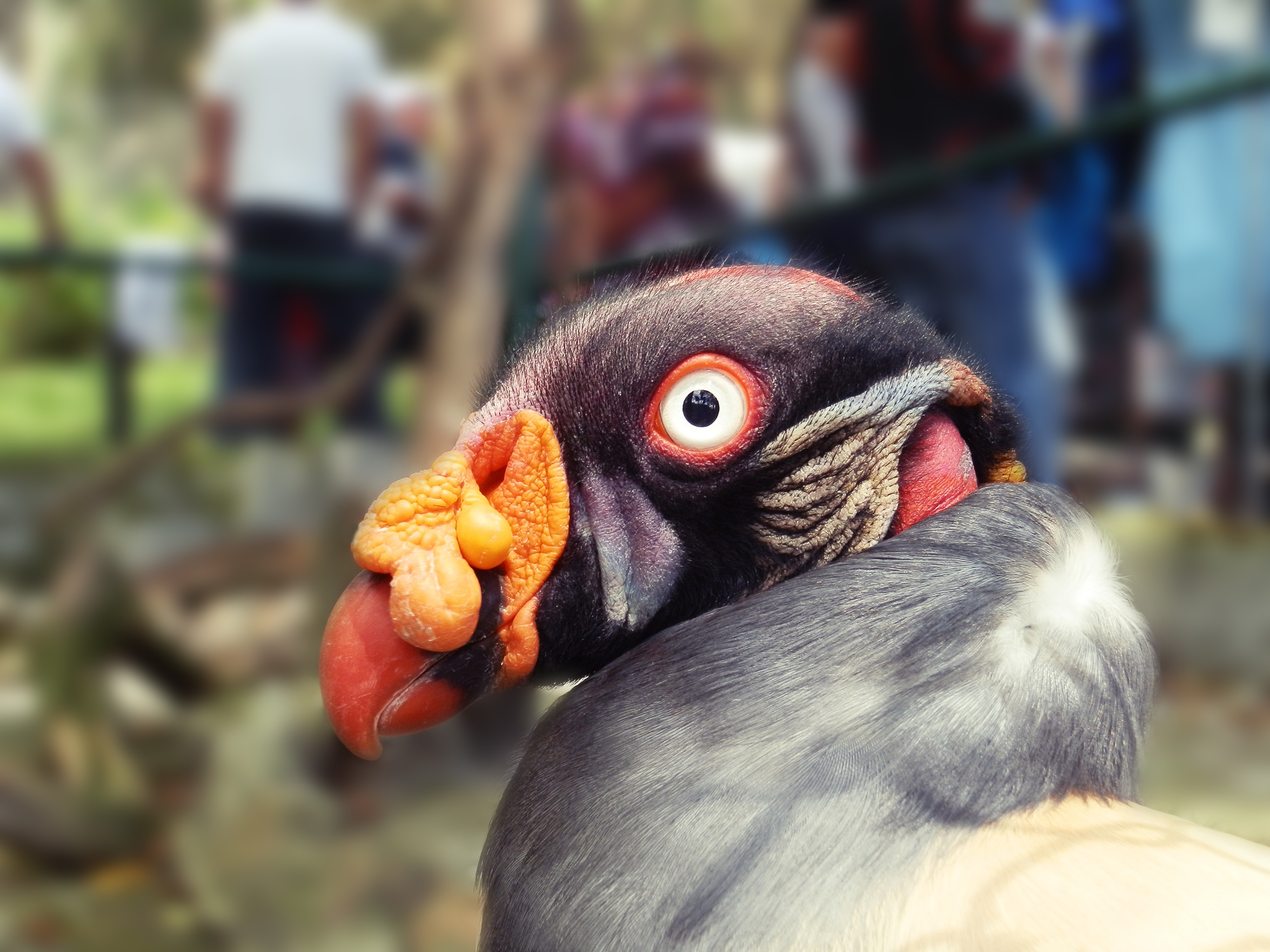

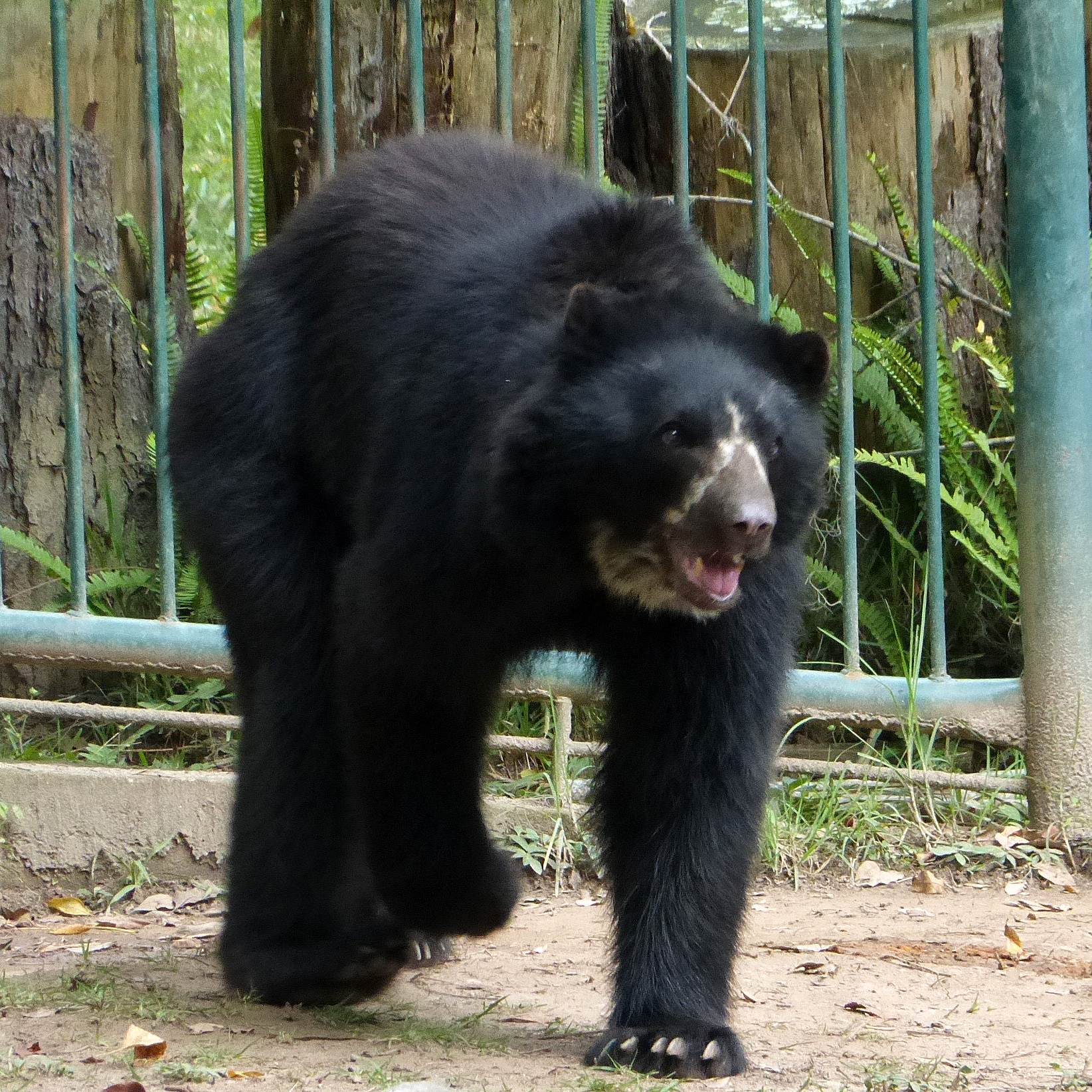

== See also ==
- List of national parks of Venezuela
- Parque Zoológico Caricuao
