= Caricuao Zoo =

Parque Zoológico Caricuao Caricuao Zoological Park
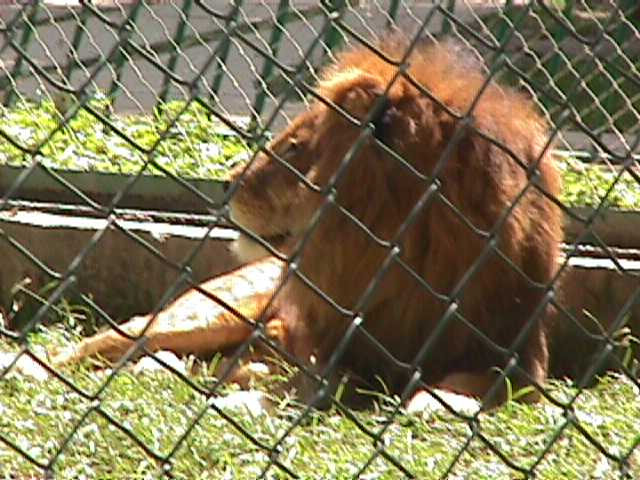
- Caricuao Zoo
- Interactive map of Parque Zoológico Caricuao; Caricuao Zoological Park
- Date opened: 1974
- Location: Caracas, Venezuela
- Land area: 630 ha
- Website: http://www.minec.gob.ve/el-parque-recreacional-zoologico-de-caricuao-arriba-a-42-anos/

Parque Zoológico Caricuao (Caricuao Zoological Park) is a zoo in Caracas, Venezuela in the Parish of Caricuao located in the southwest region of the city. The park was created by Decree No. 1682, dated March 7, 1974, but only open to the public from July 31, 1977.

== History ==
Caricuao Zoo occupies a total area of 630 hectares, of which 594 ha are for the protection of natural fauna and flora and preservation of the park's watershed. The other 36 ha have been developed into a zoological park showcasing seven specific environments.

As a result of the crisis in Venezuela, as of July 2017, the Caricuao Zoo was in severe decline. Budget cuts led to shortage of staff and animal feed, which in turn led to neglect and malnourishment. Many of the animals have died or were stolen. The zoo is down to 150 animals from the 700 housed in 2006. Attendance has also dropped due to lack of security and increase in robberies.

== See also ==
- Chorros de Milla Zoo
- Parque del Este
